= Zeekr =

Chinese automobile brand

Zeekr Intelligent Technology Holding Limited

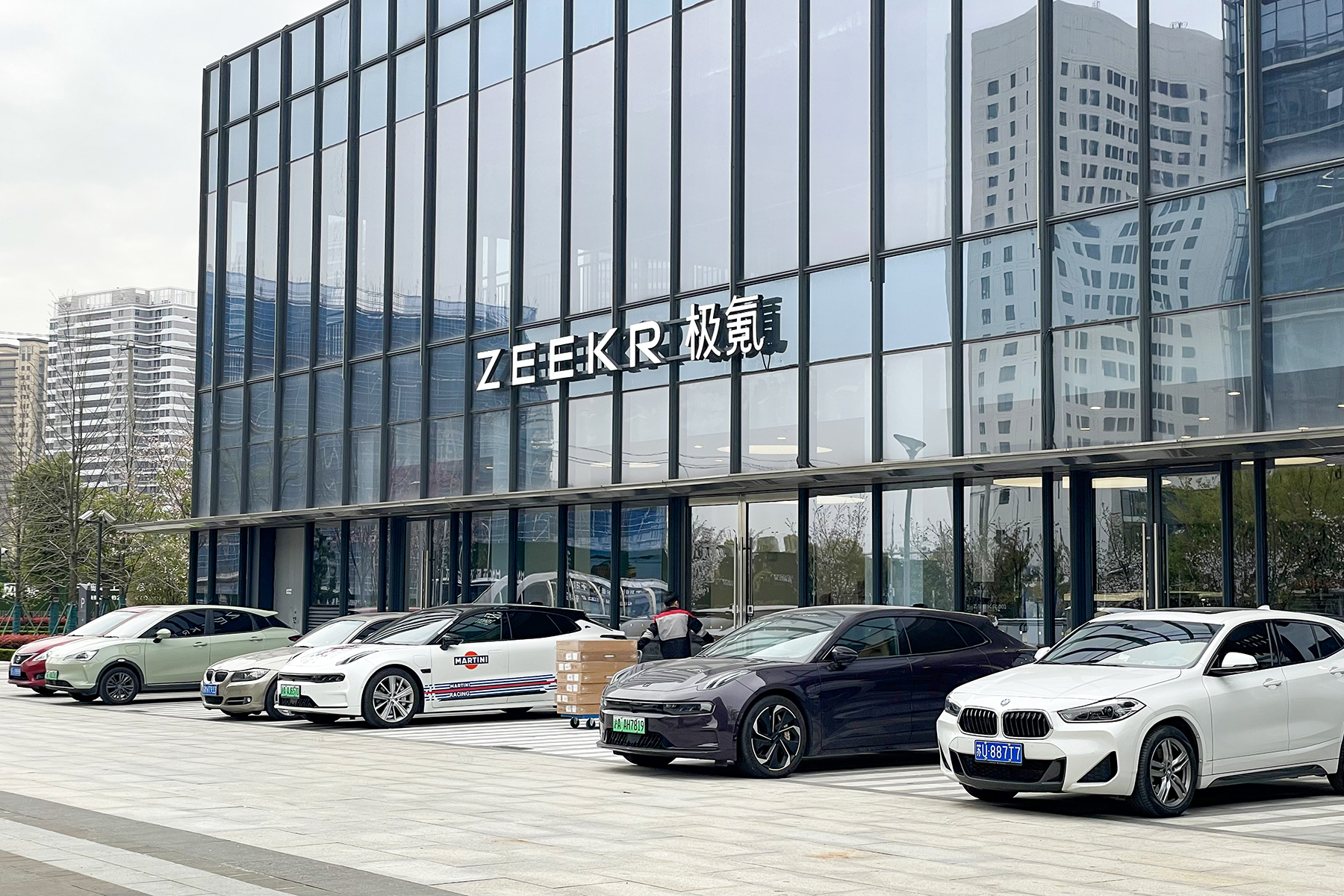
- Zeekr delivery center at Xinhuihu Building, Suzhou
- Native name: 极氪
- Type: Private
- Traded as: NYSE: ZK
- Industry: Automotive
- Founded: March 2021; 5 years ago
- Headquarters: Ningbo, Zhejiang, China
- Key people: An Conghui / Andy An (CEO); Stefan Sielaff (head of design)
- Products: Automobiles; Electric vehicles; Luxury vehicles
- Production output: ▲574,628 vehicles (2025)
- Services: Automotive finance; Vehicle leasing; Vehicle service
- Revenue: ▲US$7.28 billion (2023)
- Operating income: ▲US$1.15 billion (2023)
- Net income: ▲US$1.16 billion (2023)
- Total assets: ▲US$3.82 billion (2023)
- Total equity: ▲US$1.22 billion (2023)
- Owner: Geely Auto (100%)
- Number of employees: 16,645 (2023)
- Subsidiaries: Zeekr Technology Europe; Lynk & Co (51%); Viridi E-Mobility Technology (51%)
- Website: zeekrgroup.com; zeekrglobal.com; zeekrlife.com (China)

Zeekr Intelligent Technology Holding Limited, trading as Zeekr Group (Chinese: 极氪集团), is a Chinese automobile company. It is wholly owned by Geely Automobile Holdings.

Zeekr was founded in 2021 as a single brand specializing in luxury electric cars. Since February 2025, the entity has become a holding company known as Zeekr Group consisting of two brands following the acquisition of Lynk & Co, another brand under Geely Holding.

The name of the brand is made up of "ZE" which stands for zero, the starting point of infinite possibilities, "E" which stands for "evolving the electric era", and "KR" which stands for the element krypton, a rare gas that emits light when electrified.

== History ==
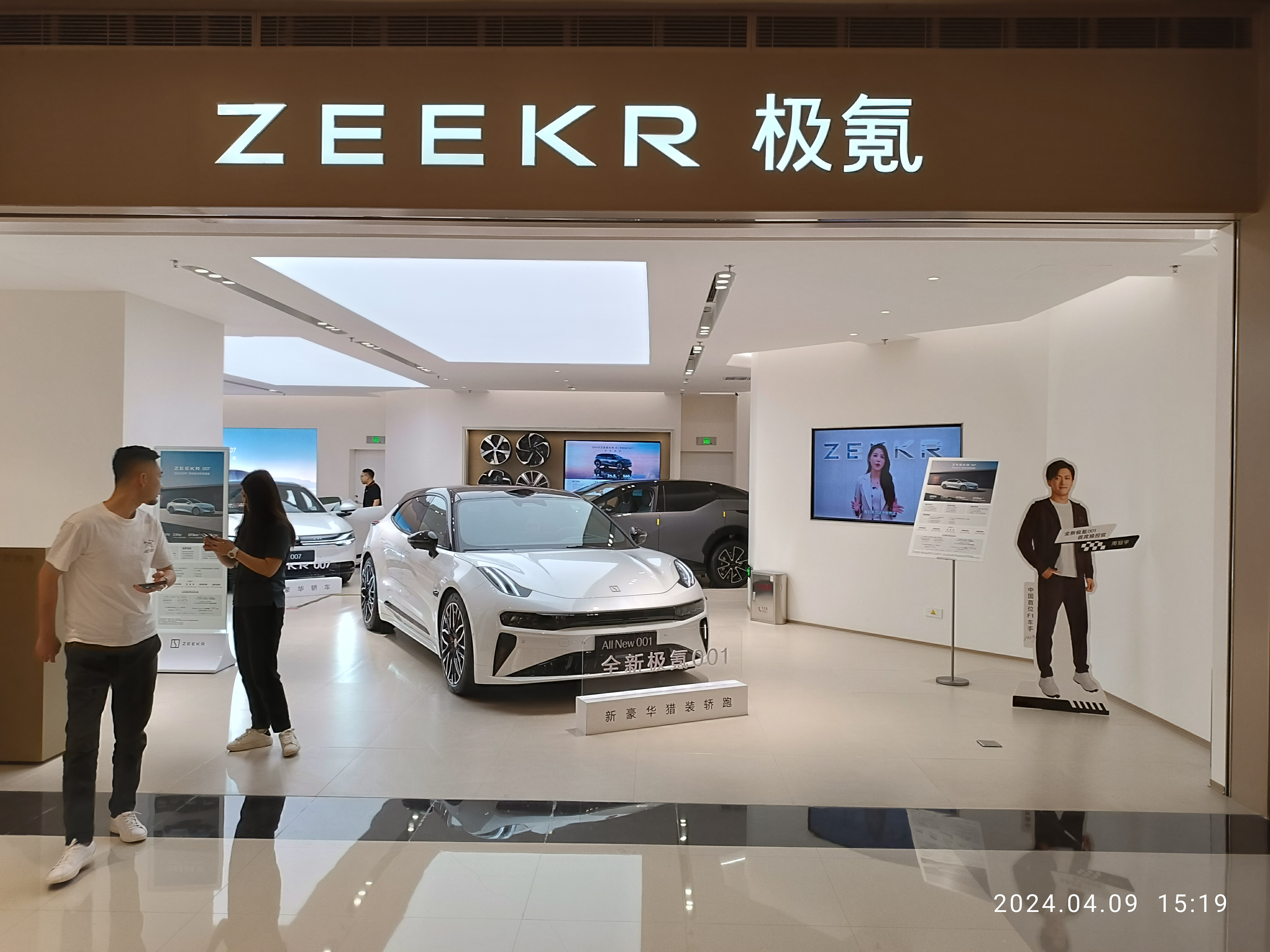
A Zeekr showroom in Shenzhen, Guangdong

Zeekr was founded in March 2021 as a premium electric mobility brand for battery-powered vehicles by the Geely Group to compete against Nio and Tesla, among others. Its first model, the Zeekr 001 was officially launched in April 2021. The Zeekr models are to be based on the SEA platform presented in autumn 2020. Zeekr started delivering the 001 model in October 2021, a vehicle originally planned to be launched by sister brand Lynk & Co. In 2022, Zeekr delivered 71,941 Zeekr 001 to customers across more than 330 cities in China. Its subsidiary Zeekr Power covers more than 110 cities with over 660 stations.

Zeekr developed Waymo's autonomous robotaxi. In December 2021, Geely announced that Zeekr would be collaborating with Waymo to develop and provide all-electric, autonomous ride-hailing vehicle for the Waymo One autonomous mobility service in the United States. The vehicle integrated with Waymo's technology was unveiled in Los Angeles in November 2022.

In January 2022, a cooperation between Zeekr and Mobileye was announced to expand their strategic technology partnership with a goal to deliver the world's first consumer autonomous vehicles with L4 abilities by 2024.

In August 2022, Zeekr announced their cooperation with CATL, making them the first brand to use CATL's Qilin long range batteries for global mass production. The Zeekr 001 will be the first model to use the new batteries, enabling them to have a pure electric range exceeding 1,000 kilometres (620 mi).

Zeekr raised US$500 million in its first external fundraising from five investors including Intel Capital, CATL, Bilibili in August 2021. On February 13, 2023, Zeekr is valued at US$13 billion after it raised US$750 million from five investors. In May 2024, Zeekr filed its initial public offering (IPO) on the New York Stock Exchange. Zeekr raised around US$441 million, making it the largest IPO of a Chinese company since 2021.

In August 2024, Zeekr has faced criticism for launching the 2025 model year of the Zeekr 001 in China just six months after releasing the previous version in February 2024. It led to protests among customers who recently purchased the earlier model, as their vehicles have quickly been superseded by a newer version. The 2024 model came equipped with Mobileye chips, which cannot be upgraded to the new Haohan Intelligent Driving 2.0 system from the 2025 model. In response, Zhejiang Geely Holding President and Zeekr CEO An Conghui (Andy An) acknowledged the issue, admitting that the company could have better communicated its product release plans.

According to Reuters and the China Securities Journal, many Zeekr vehicles sold in Xiamen in December 2024 were pre-registered with insurance under Xiamen C&D and its affiliates before being sold to customers, raising questions about the timing of reported sales. While Zeekr recorded 2,737 sales in the city that month—2,508 of which were to companies—only 271 vehicles were registered for license plates, suggesting a discrepancy between reported and actual deliveries.

On 16 June 2025, Zeekr announced that their 500,000th vehicle rolled off the production line, a 009 Brilliant Edition, 44 months after their first vehicle, the 001, rolled off the production line in October 2021.

On 8 August 2025, Zeekr publicly announced its plans for updating its product lineup for the rest of the year, fulfilling its commitment to keeping product update frequency over one year and providing transparency to consumers. The Zeekr X will receive the Golden Battery as an option and minor interior changes before the fourth quarter of 2025. In the fourth quarter, the Zeekr 001 and 7X will be upgraded with Nvidia Thor-U ADAS chips, 900V power electronics, and minor interior and exterior adjustments. The Zeekr 007 will also receive minor interior and exterior adjustments, and Zeekr says all other models will not receive updates in 2025.

=== Restructuring and privatization ===
In November 2024, the equity structures of Geely Auto, Zeekr, and Lynk & Co were modified in line with Geely Holding Group's restructuring strategy. Geely Holding Group transferred its 11.3% stake in Zeekr Intelligent Technology (Zeekr) to Geely Automobile Holdings (Geely Auto). As a result, Geely Auto's shareholding in Zeekr increased to 62.8%. Zeekr subsequently announced its acquisition of a 20% stake in Lynk & Co from Geely Auto for 3.6 billion yuan, along with Volvo Cars' 30% stake in Lynk & Co for 5.4 billion yuan. This transaction raised Zeekr's ownership in Lynk & Co to 51%, while the remaining 49% continues to be held by Geely Auto.

In December 2024, Lin Jinwen, vice president of Zeekr Intelligent Technology, stated on Chinese social media Weibo that following the integration of Zeekr and Lynk & Co, the company entity "Zhejiang Zeekr Intelligent Technology Co., Ltd." would remain unchanged but would operate under a new name, "Zeekr Technology Group". On 14 February 2025, Zeekr announced the completion of these transactions, and Lynk & Co became a subsidiary brand under Zeekr Intelligent Technology Holding Limited (Zeekr Group).

In May 2025, Geely Auto announced that it plans to acquire 34.3% share of Zeekr. Zeekr will be delisted after transaction is completed.

In July 2025, Geely Holding Group announced that its subsidiary Geely Auto had officially signed a merger agreement with Zeekr. Geely Auto acquired all remaining Zeekr shares it does not already own, making Zeekr a wholly owned subsidiary of Geely Auto. The privatization was completed in December 2025.

== Market availability ==
Zeekr first launched in China and started expanding into Europe. Its first European showroom opened in Stockholm, Sweden, in 2023. Sweden, together with the Netherlands, were the first European markets which Zeekr entered in 2023.

In 2024, the brand expanded into Denmark, Germany, France, Norway, Israel, and Australia, and plans to enter the Singapore market by the end of the year. It officially entered Thailand in July 2024 by introducing the Zeekr X. Zeekr is also set to enter the Brazilian market in September 2024. Zeekr also entered the Australian market in 2025. Zeekr plans to enter the Indonesian market in 2026 along with Lynk & Co through Geely Auto Indonesia, after delaying its entry in 2025. Zeekr Korea debuted in May 2026.

== Facility ==
In 2023, Zeekr had three R&D facilities in China – Ningbo, Hangzhou, Shanghai as well as Zeekr Technology Europe (previously China Euro Vehicle Technology or CEVT) in Gothenburg, Sweden. Its global design center is also located in Gothenburg, Sweden. Zeekr's European headquarters and sales office were moved from Gothenburg to Amsterdam due to higher concentration of experienced sales professionals.

Zeekr's factory has a manufacturing capacity of up to 300,000 vehicles per year and can be expanded further.

== Products ==
=== Current Zeekr models ===
- Zeekr 001 (2021–present), full-size shooting brake, BEV
- Zeekr 007 (2023–present), mid-size sedan, BEV
  - Zeekr 007GT (2025–present), shooting brake variant
- Zeekr 009 (2023–present), full-size MPV, BEV
- Zeekr X (2023–present), compact SUV, BEV
- Zeekr 7X (2024–present), mid-size SUV, BEV
- Zeekr 8X (2026–present), full-size SUV, PHEV
- Zeekr 9X (2025–present), full-size SUV, PHEV
- Zeekr Mix (2024–present), compact MPV, BEV
- Waymo Ojai (2024–present for production; 2026–present for service), robotaxi, BEV
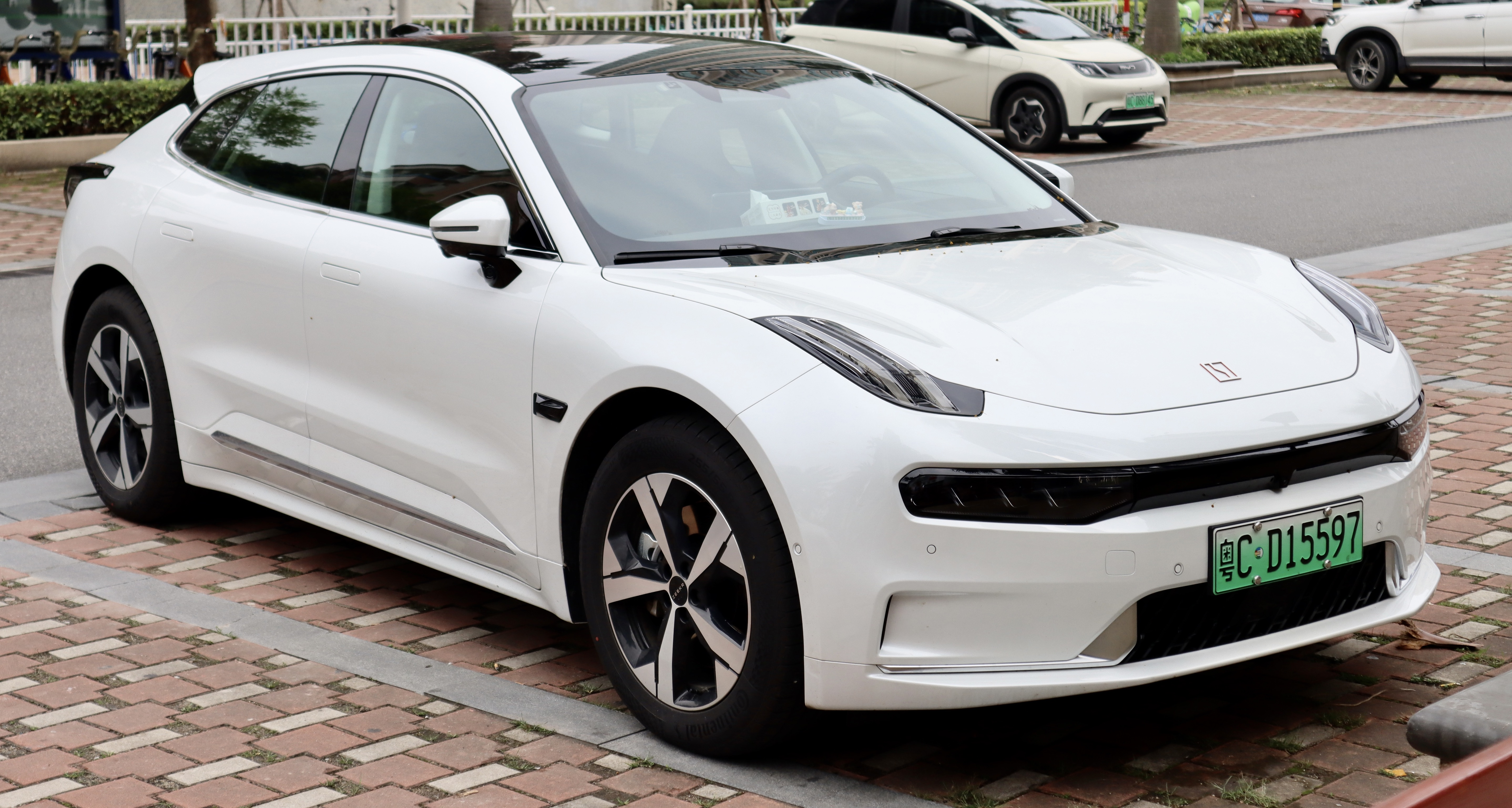
Zeekr 001

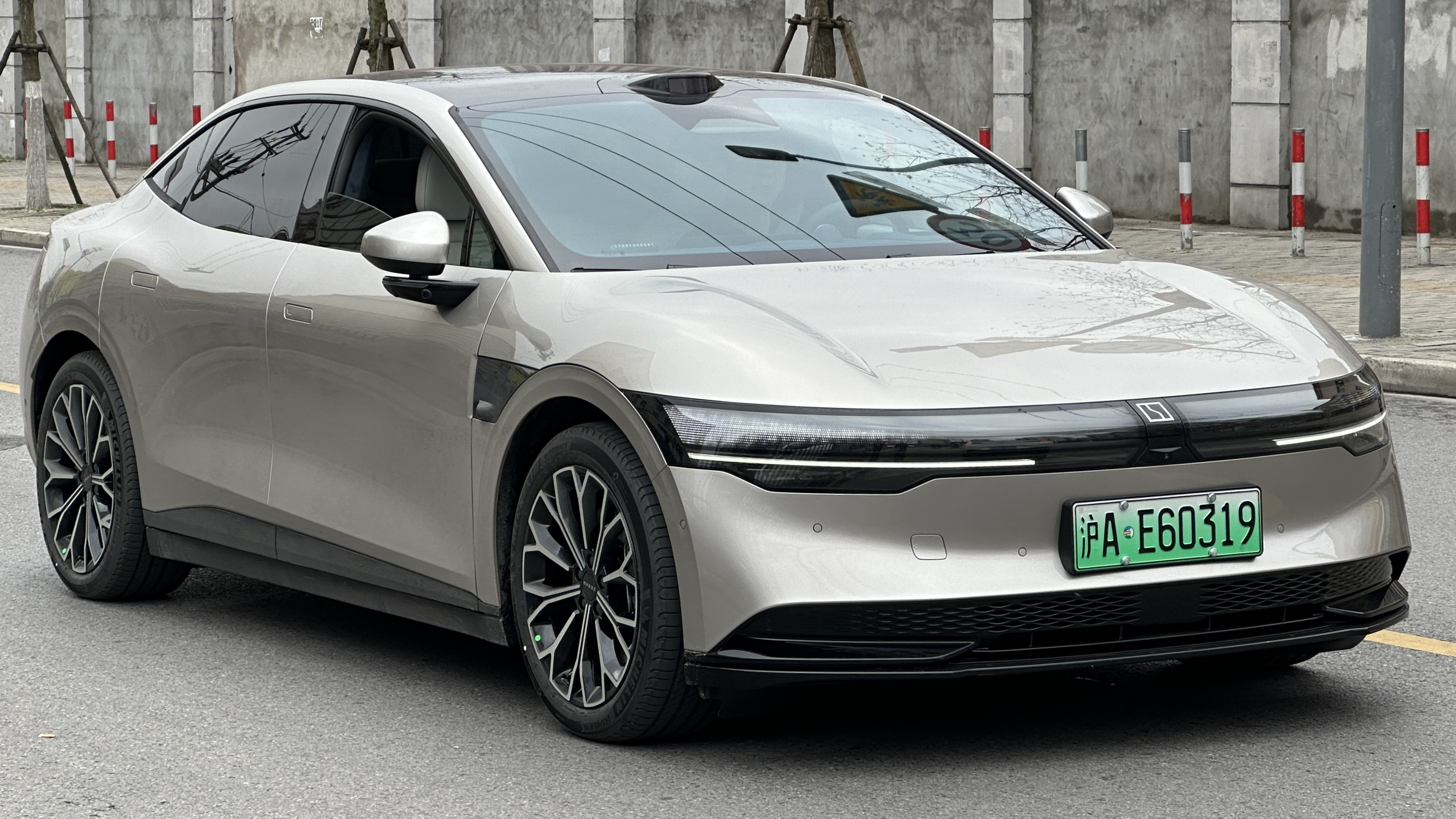
Zeekr 007

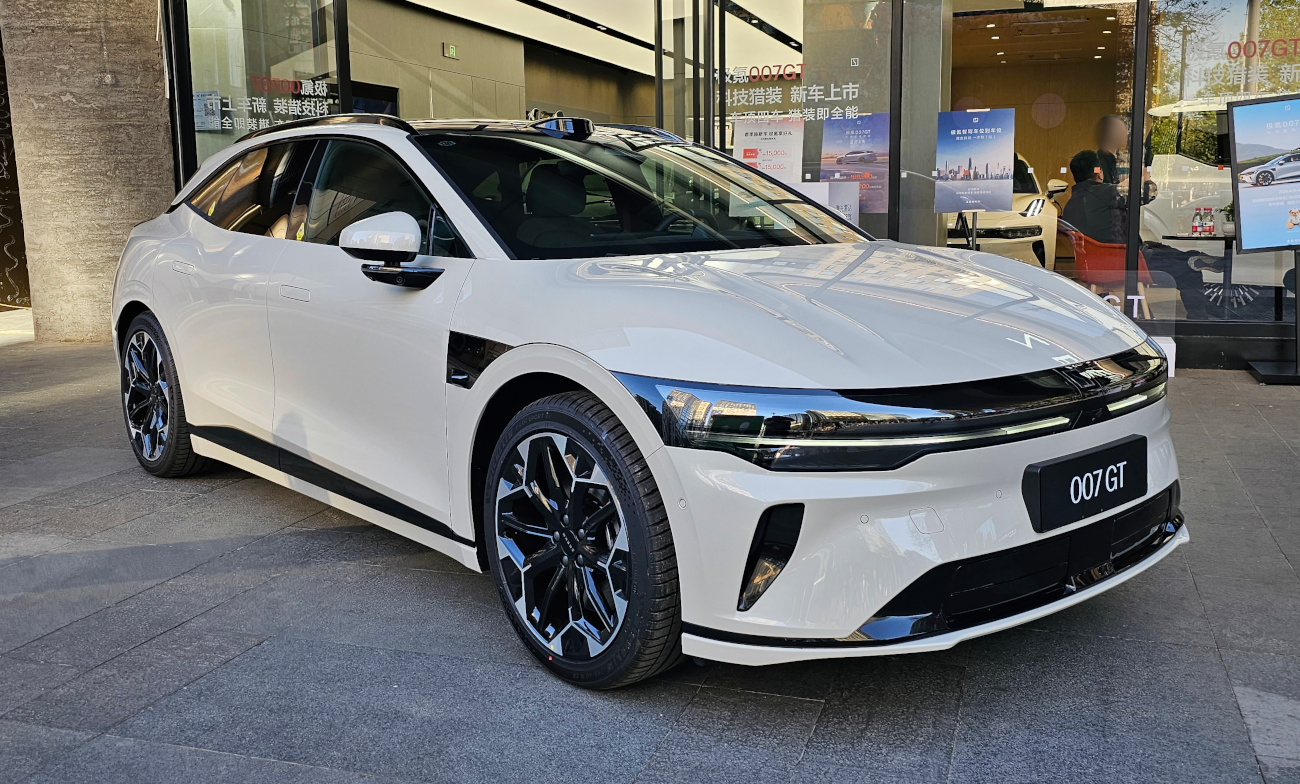
Zeekr 007 GT

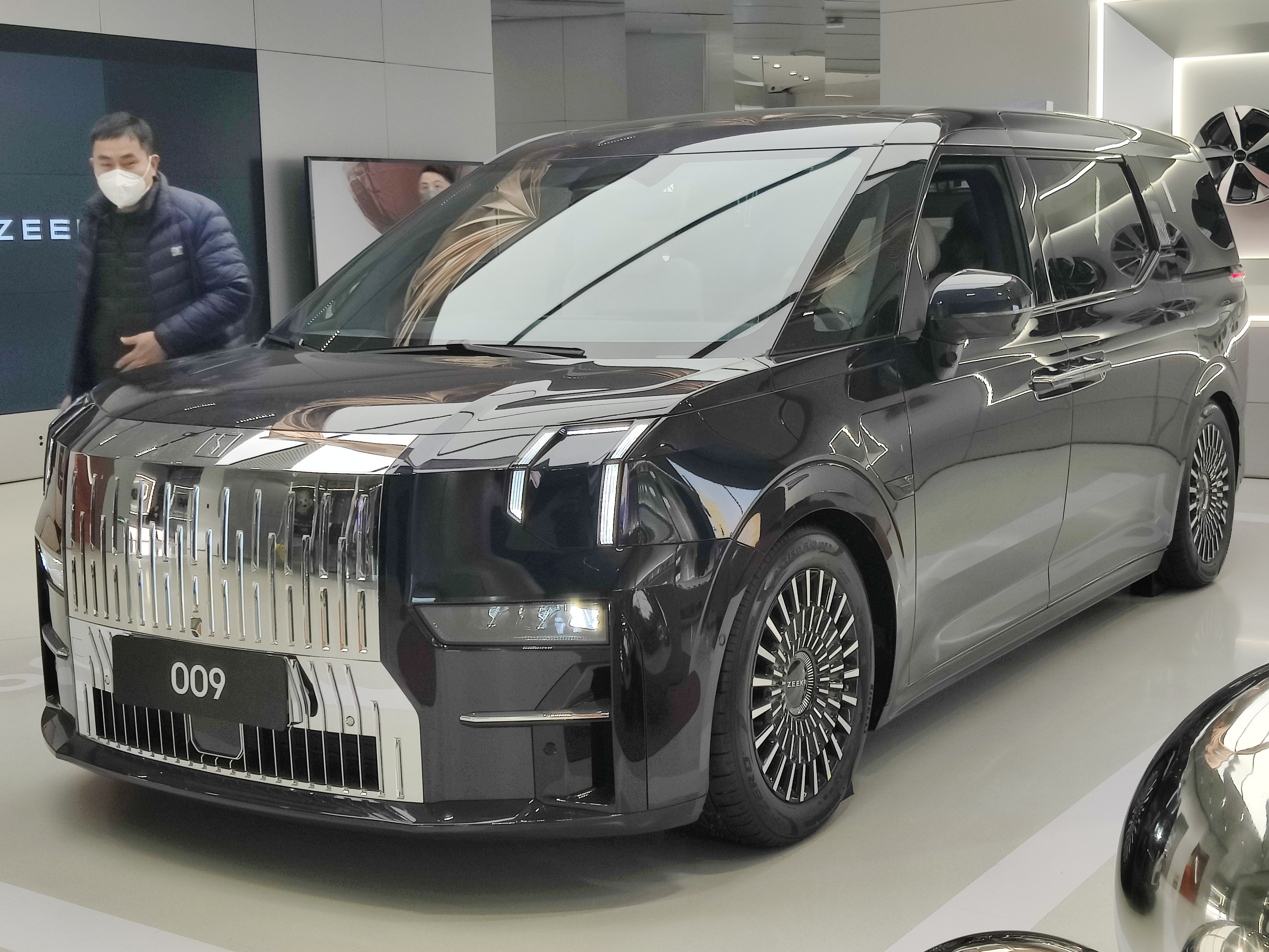
Zeekr 009

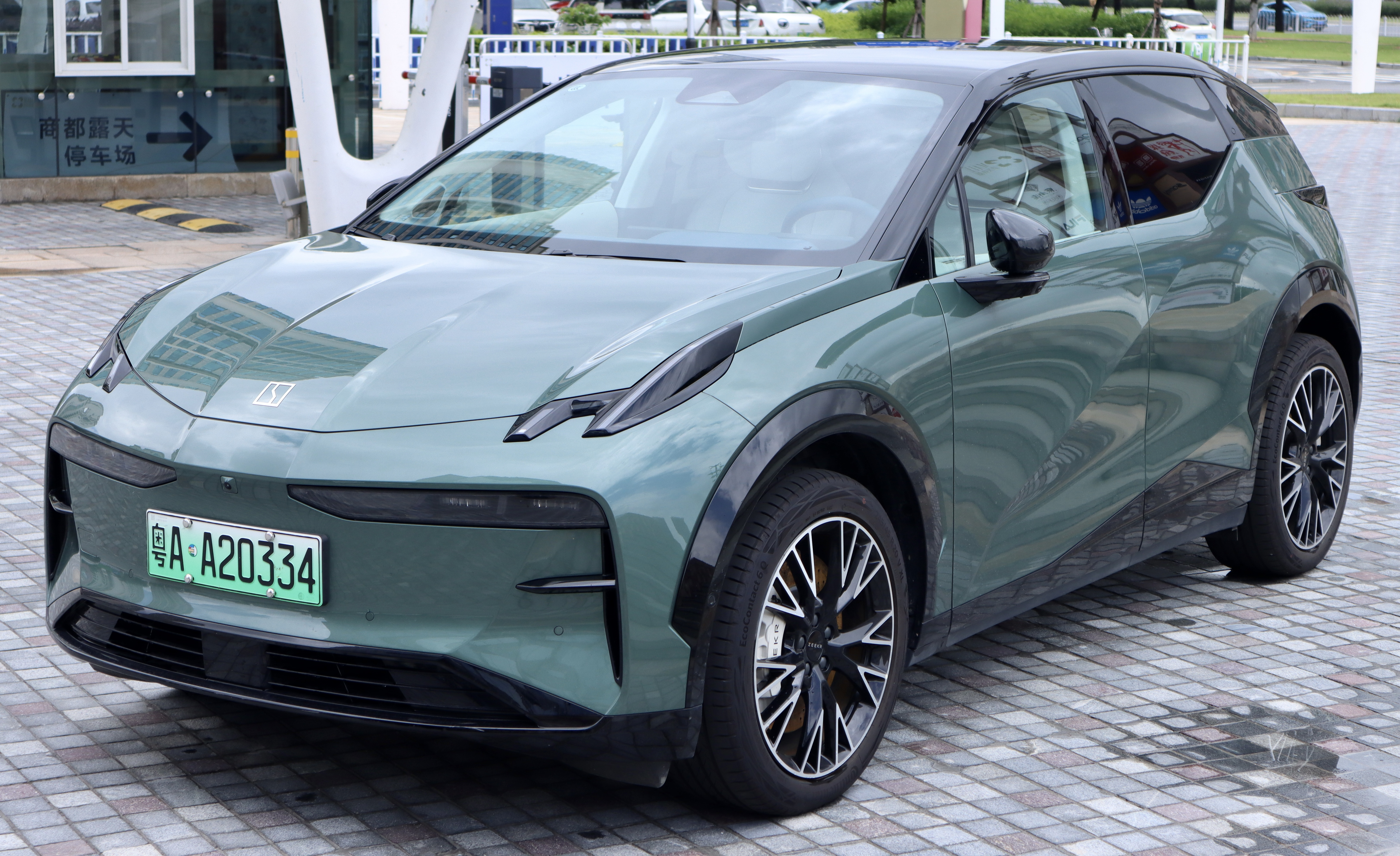
Zeekr X

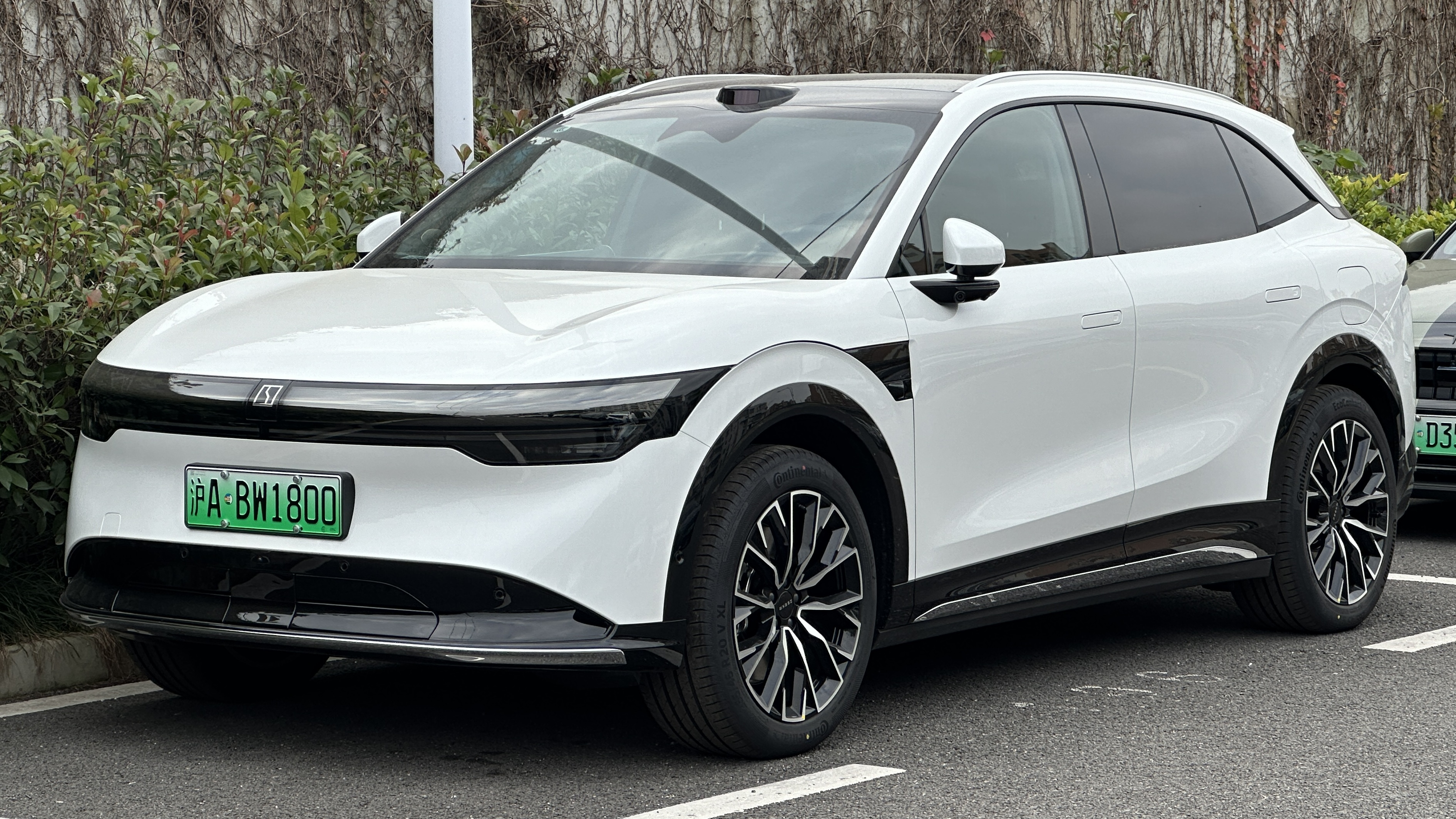
Zeekr 7X

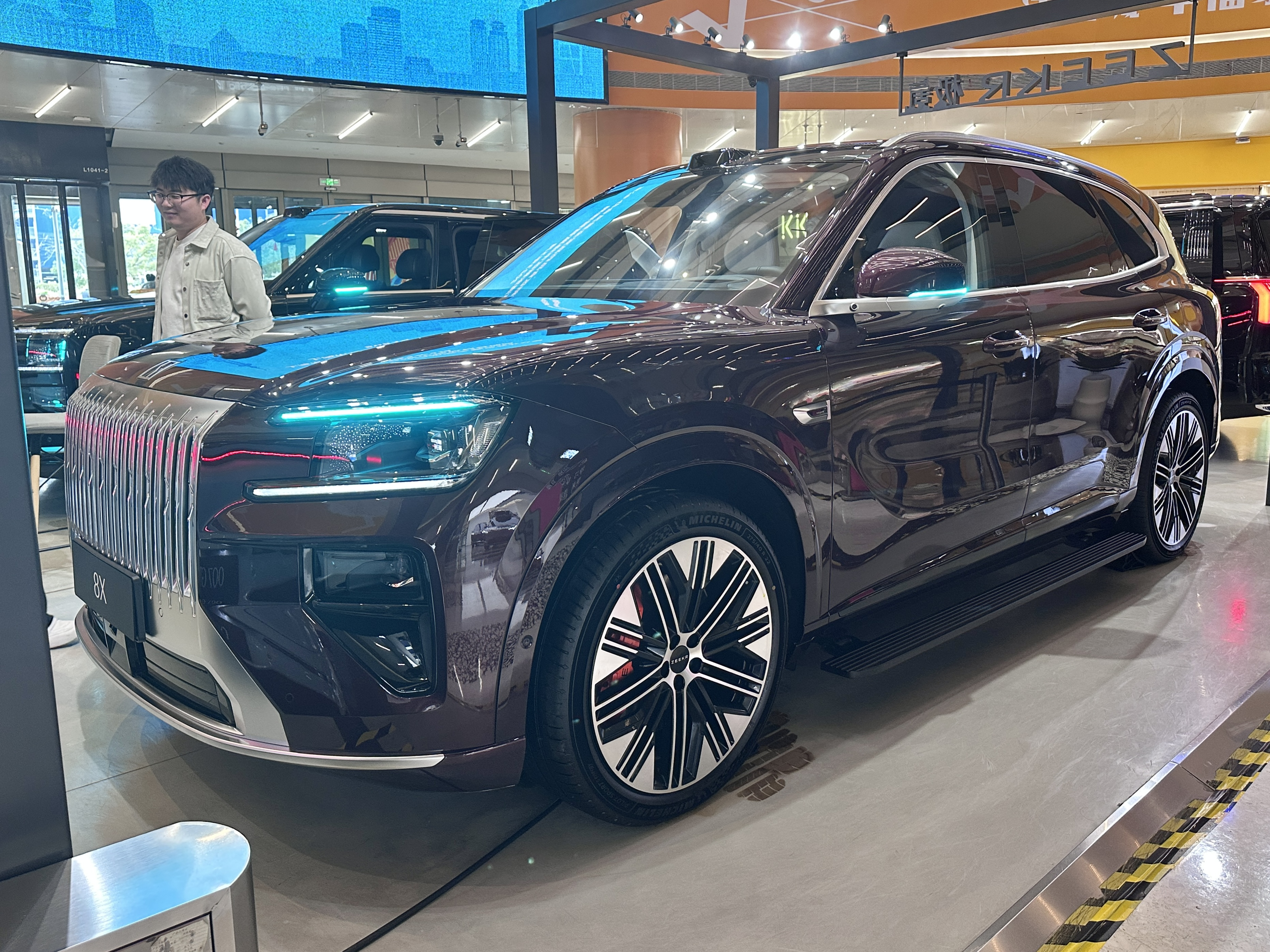
Zeekr 8X

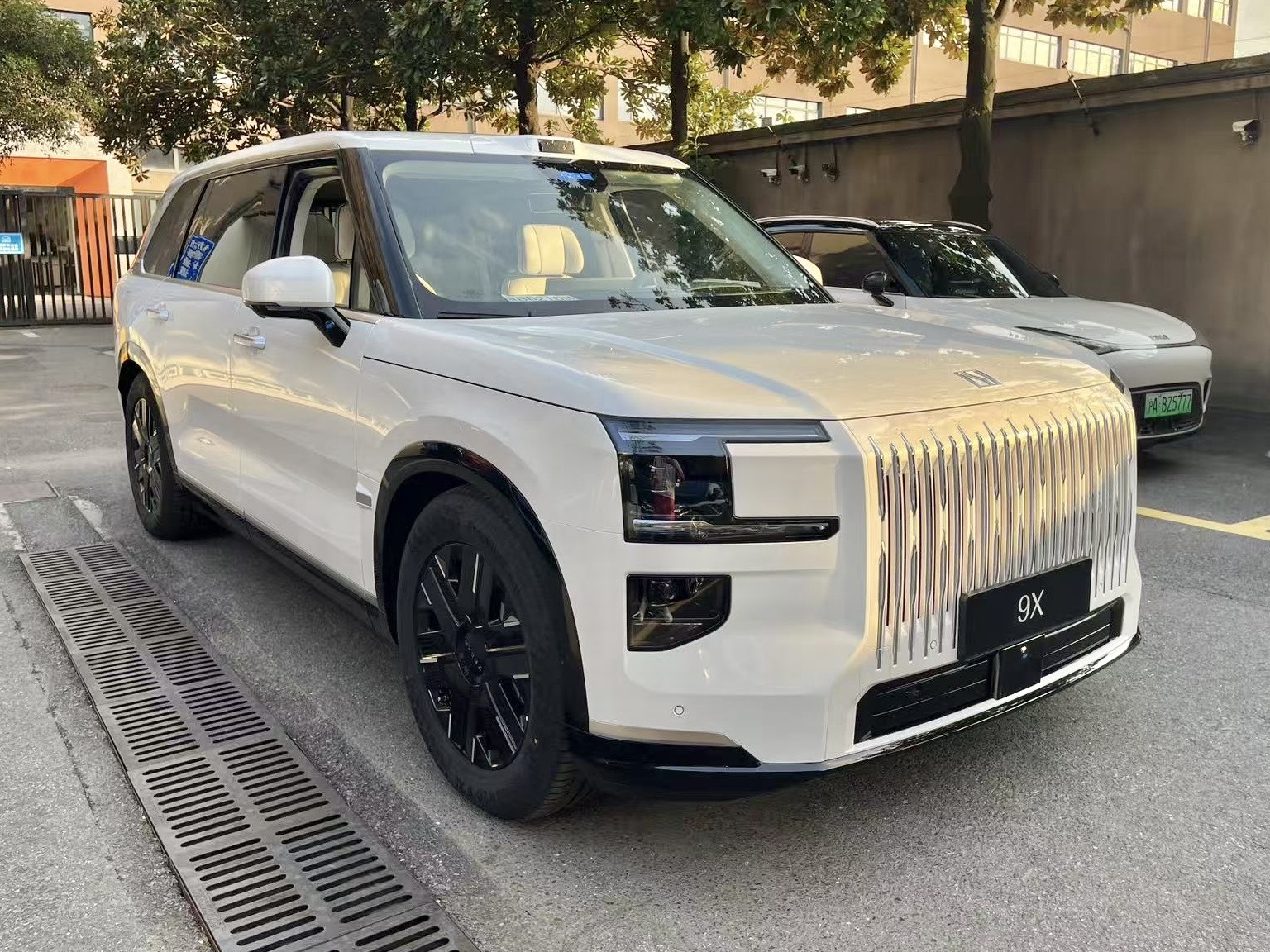
Zeekr 9X

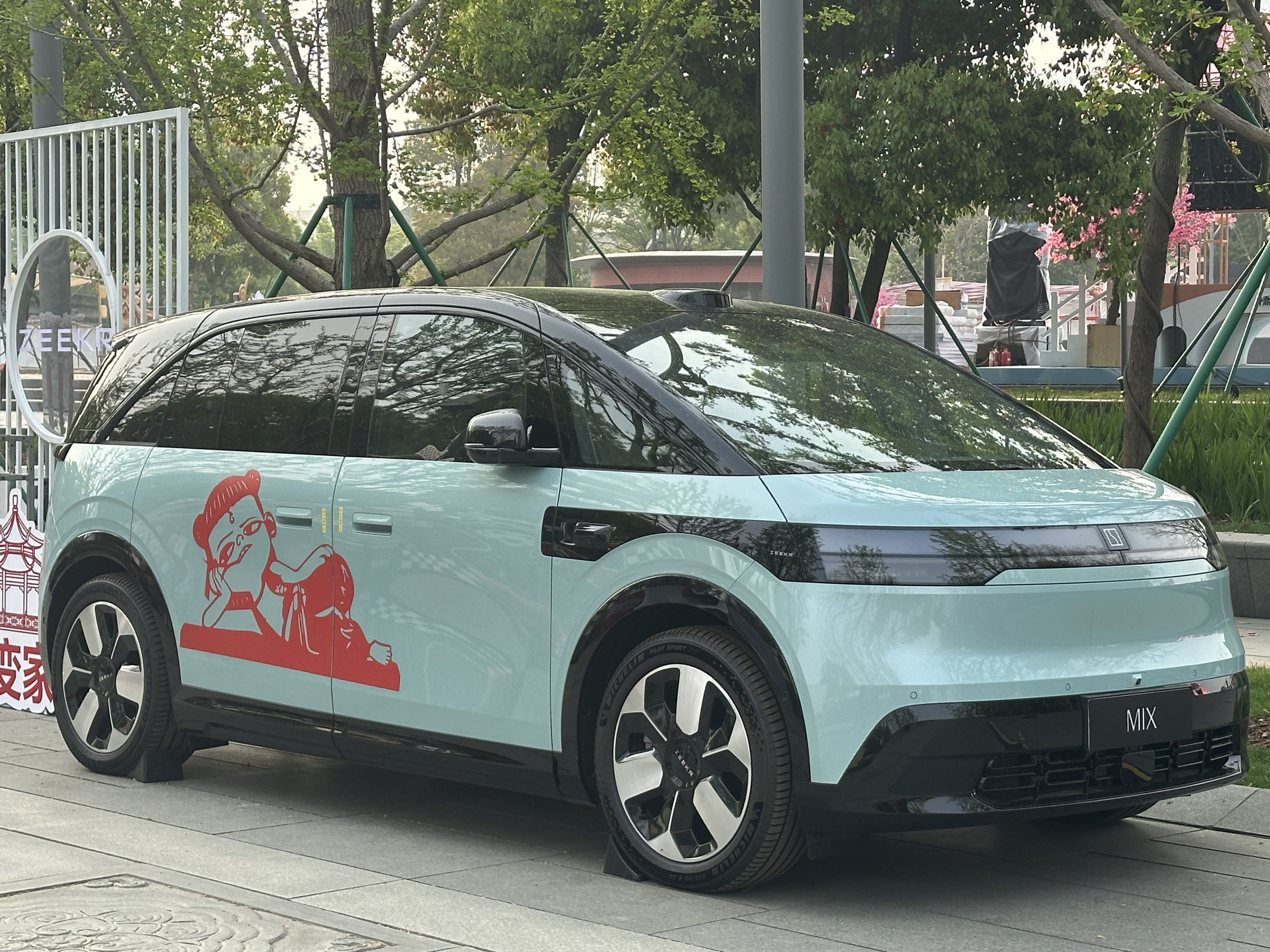
Zeekr Mix

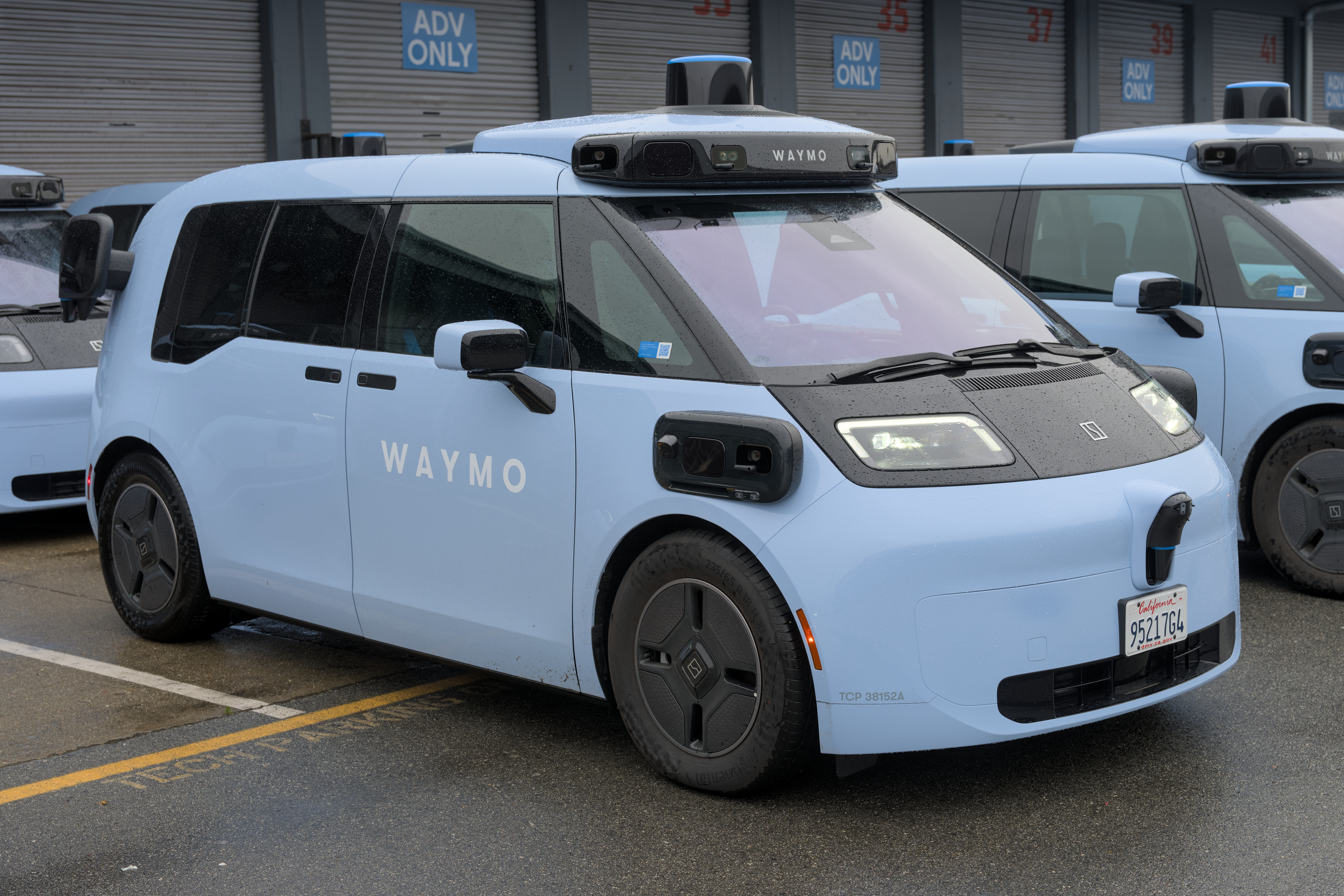
Waymo Ojai

=== Concept models ===
- Zeekr M-Vision (Waymo Concept) (2021)

M-Vision is built on SEA-M architecture to showcase the architecture's fundamental features such as expansive interior, open seat choice, and placement option, no B-pillar, and robust electrical/electronic (E/E) backbone supporting autonomous drive and connected devices. M-Vision is a base model that can be developed for a range of future mobility products including robotaxis, multi-purpose vehicles, and logistics vehicles.

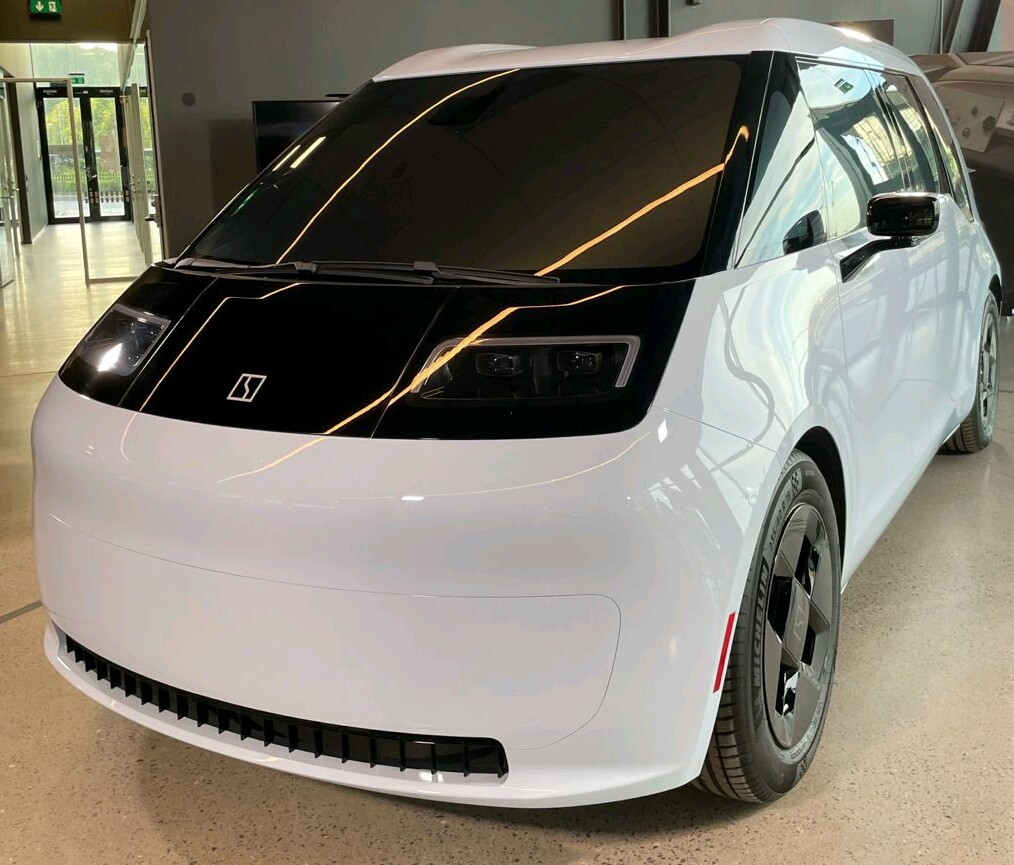
Zeekr M-Vision

=== Lynk & Co ===
Lynk & Co (Chinese: 领克; pinyin: Lǐng kè) is a car brand established in 2016. Before November 2024, it was owned 50% by Geely Auto, 30% by Volvo Cars, and 20% by Geely Holding Group. Since 2025, it is 51% owned by Zeekr and 49% owned by Geely Auto.

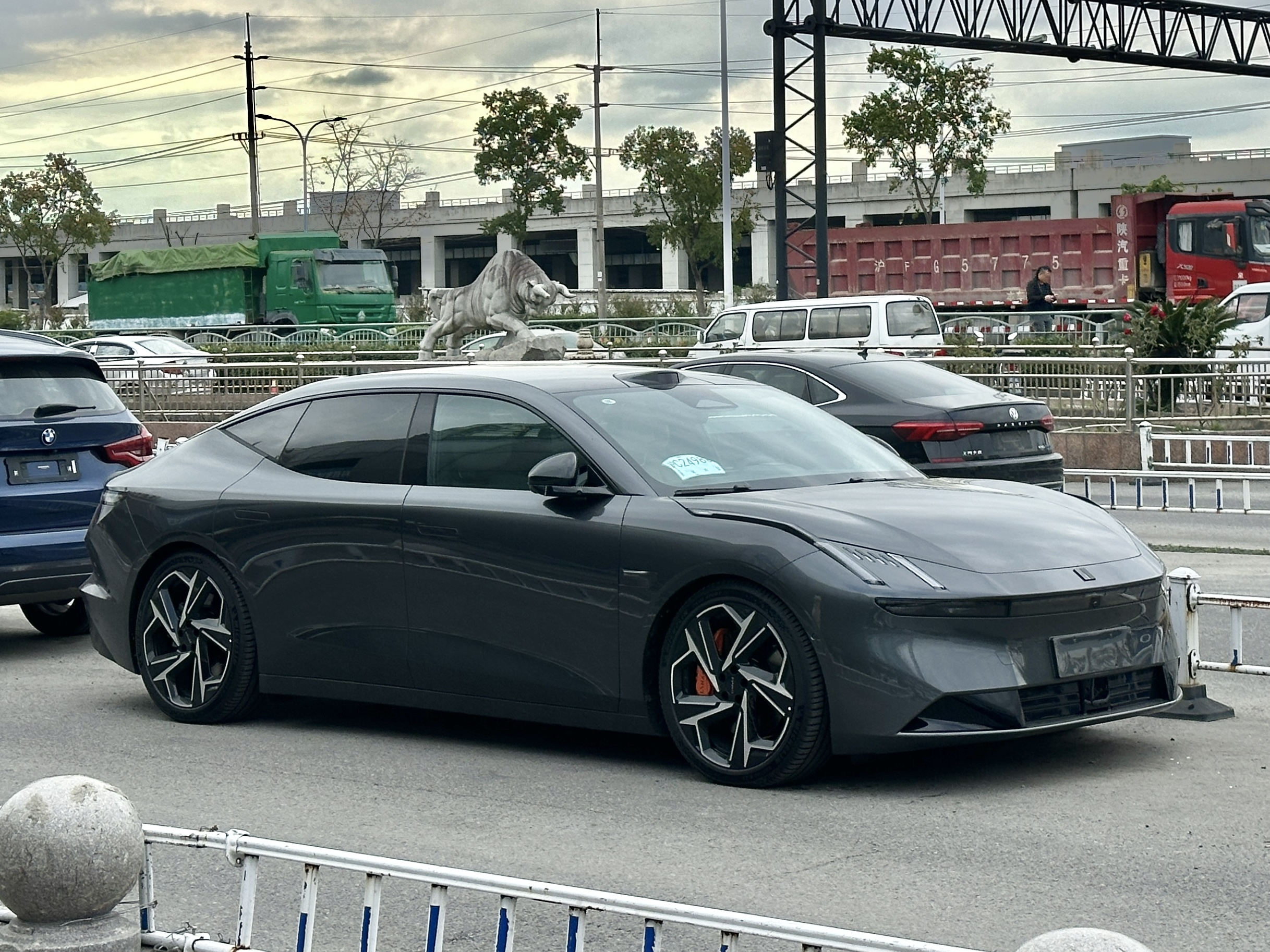
Lynk & Co Z10

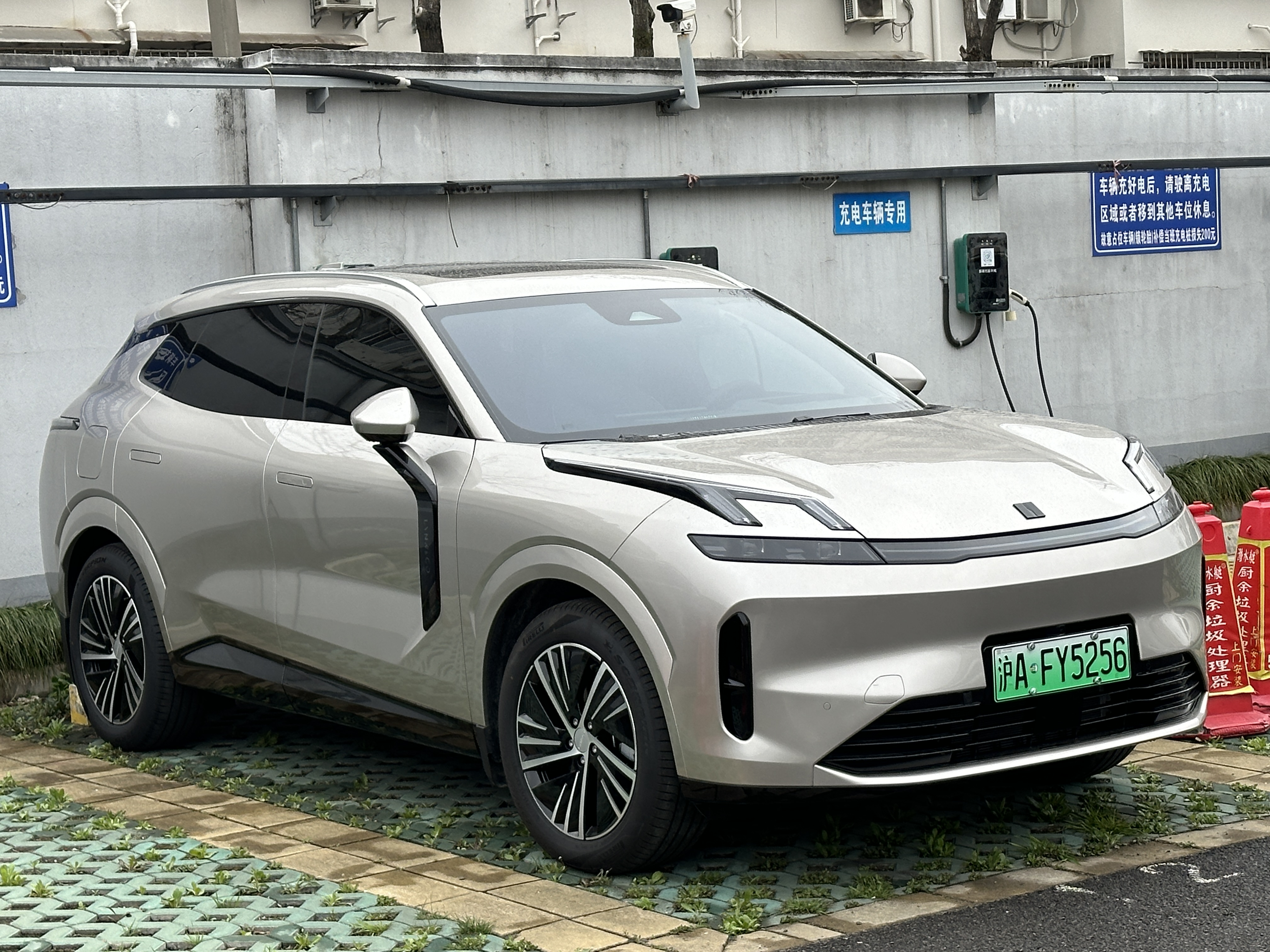
Lynk & Co 08 EM-P

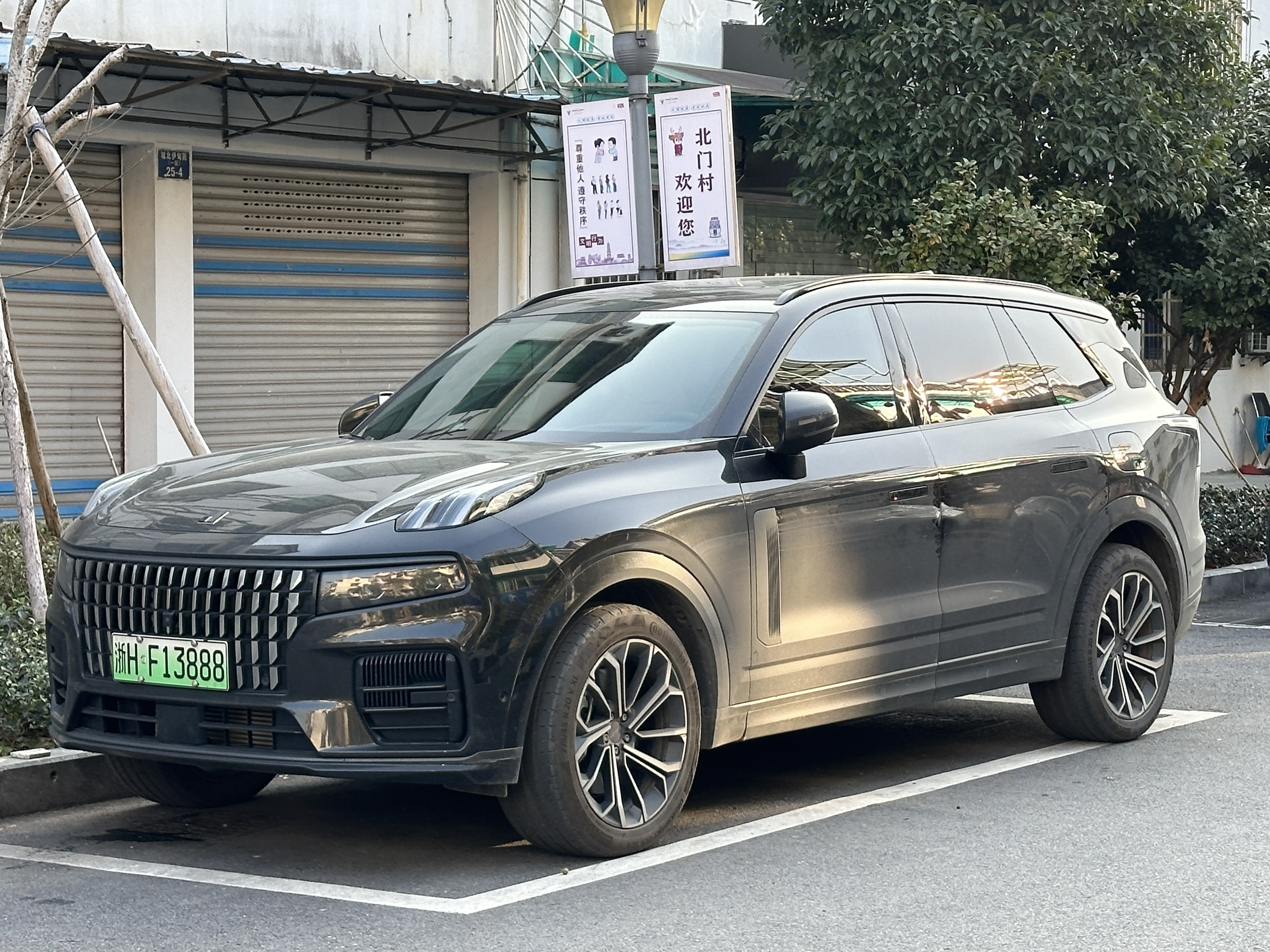
Lynk & Co 09 EM-P

== Sales ==
Year	Zeekr brand
2021	6,007
2022	71,941
2023	118,685
2024	222,123
2025	224,133

== See also ==
- Zeekr Technology Europe
- Polestar
- Lynk & Co
- Volvo Cars
- Automobile manufacturers and brands of China
- List of automobile manufacturers of China
