= Geely Technology Europe =

Automotive research centre

Coordinates: 57°42′43″N 11°56′45″E

Geely Technology Europe AB

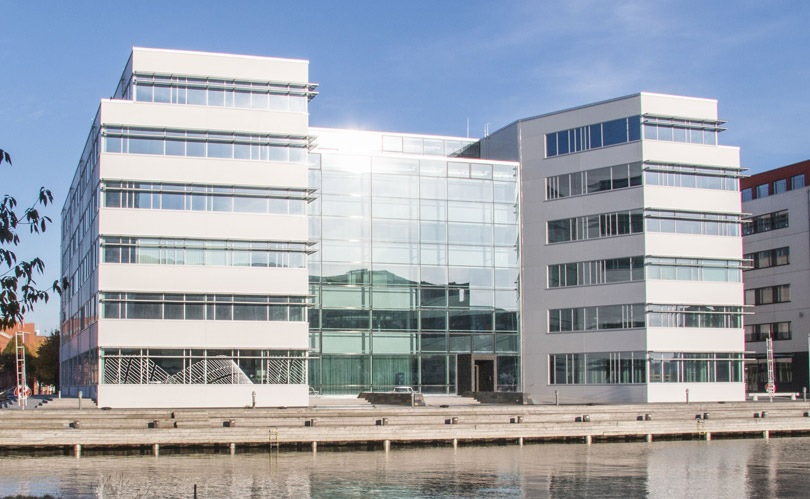
- Formerly: Zeekr Technology Europe AB (2023–2026); China Euro Vehicle Technology AB (CEVT) (2013–2023)
- Industry: Automotive industry
- Founded: 2013
- Headquarters: Pumpgatan 1, Gothenburg, Sweden
- Key people: Giovanni Lanfranchi (CEO)
- Owner: Geely Auto
- Website: www.geelytech.eu/en

Geely Technology Europe AB, formerly Zeekr Technology Europe AB between 2023 and 2026 and China Euro Vehicle Technology AB (CEVT) between 2013 and 2023, is the European automotive research and development centre of Geely Auto Group.

The company is located at the Geely Innovation Centre, in a 100,000 square meter building called Uni3 in Lindholmen district of Gothenburg, Sweden.

== Business ==
Geely Technology Europe develops technologies and cars for Geely-owned brands, mainly Geely, Lynk & Co and Zeekr, as well as related brands such as Volvo Cars, Polestar, Lotus, LEVC, and Proton. In 2024, the company had more than a thousand full-time employees and annual revenue of around 4 billion Swedish krona. It also does development work for other companies, such as developing a platform for Waymo's autonomous taxis.

== History ==
=== As China Euro Vehicle Technology ===
When Geely acquired Volvo, it used platform technology from its previous owner Ford. Volvo hired Mats Fägerhag, previous development manager at the now-defunct Swedish automaker Saab, to find a development partner to Volvo for their smaller cars.

Geely planned to buy a research and development centre in Europe, but instead, CEVT was founded in 2013 with Mats Fägerhag as CEO, in the same Swedish city as Volvo's headquarters and with many engineers with background from Saab.

The first main objective for CEVT was to develop the CMA platform for the smaller Volvo cars, which also was to be used in the Lynk & Co cars. Difference is that for Volvo, CEVT only developed the platform, for Lynk the assignment was to design the entire car including car body and interior and this partnership resulted in the models Lynk & Co 01, 02 and 03.

In 2016, the first Lynk & Co developed by CEVT was presented and the following year Volvo XC40 (using the CMA platform). CEVT have also developed the modular SEA-platform for electric vehicles, mainly used in the Geely group of car companies and used in cars such as Zeekr 001, Polestar 4, Volvo EX30, Smart #1 and Smart #3.

Besides cars and platform development, CEVT develops common solutions for autonomous driving, automotive electrification, mobility solutions, software development and component development for the Geely group, such as the fully modular automatic 7-speed Dual-Clutch transmission presented in 2019.

=== Zeekr Technology Europe ===
September 4, 2023, Giovanni Lanfranchi became the new CEO of CEVT and the company had during the year before this shift in leadership started to describe itself as the "European R&D centre for Zeekr", but also that their design was to be found in the "Geely family, such as Zeekr, Geely Auto, Volvo Cars, Lynk & Co and Lotus". In March 2024, CEVT was renamed Zeekr Technology Europe AB, reflecting its role in Zeekr's development and global expansion. In March 2026, Zeekr Technology Europe AB was renamed Geely Technology Europe AB, reflecting its role in Geely’s development and global expansion [14] .
