= Zeekr 8X =

Plug-in hybrid full-size luxury SUV

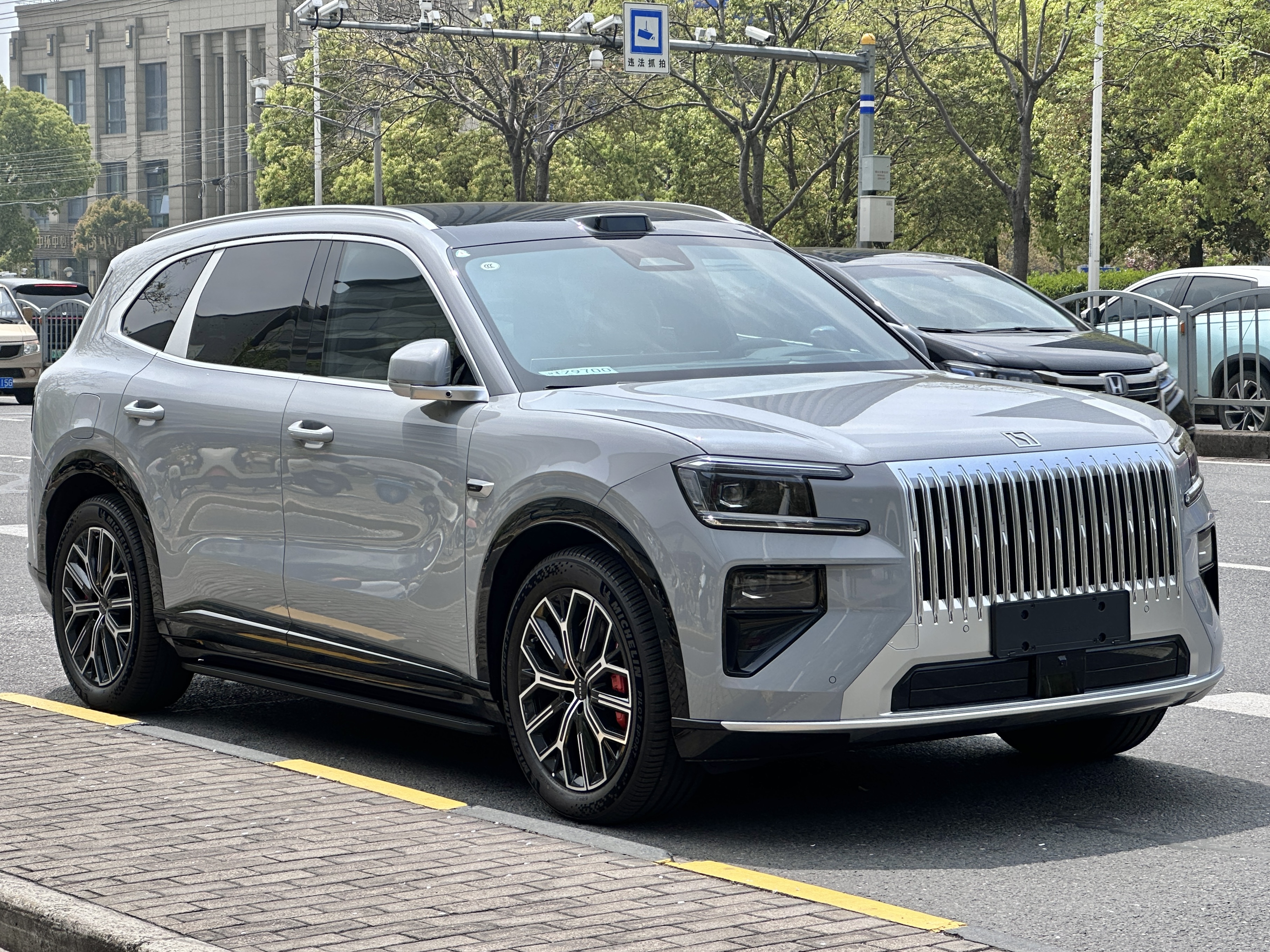
- The Zeekr 8X in Shanghai, China.

Overview
- Manufacturer: Zeekr (Geely Auto)
- Model code: DX1H
- Production: 2026–present
- Assembly: China: Ningbo, Zhejiang
- Designer: Jon Rådbrink under Stefan Sielaff

Body and chassis
- Class: Full-size luxury SUV
- Body style: 5-door SUV
- Layout: Front-engine, dual or tri-motor, all-wheel-drive
- Platform: Sustainable Experience Architecture S
- Related: Zeekr 9X

Powertrain
- Engine: Petrol plug-in hybrid: 2.0 L DHE20-PFZ turbo I4
- Power output: Up to 1,381 hp (1,030 kW; 1,400 PS)
- Hybrid drivetrain: Plug-in hybrid
- Battery: 55.1 kWh CATL Freevoy NMC; 70 kWh CATL Freevoy NMC
- Range: 982–1,049 km (610–652 mi) (WLTP)
- Electric range: 256–328 km (159–204 mi) (WLTP); 220–380 km (137–236 mi) (CLTC)
- Plug-in charging: V2L: 6 kW AC; V2V: 60 kW DC; 500kW 900V DC

Dimensions
- Wheelbase: 3,069 mm (120.8 in)
- Length: 5,100 mm (200.8 in)
- Width: 1,998 mm (78.7 in)
- Height: 1,780 mm (70.1 in)
- Curb weight: 2,660–2,820 kg (5,860–6,220 lb)

The Zeekr 8X (Chinese: 极氪8X; pinyin: Jíkè 8X) is a plug-in hybrid full-size luxury SUV produced by Zeekr. After being officially teased and confirmed, the 8X was revealed through official documents on 8 January 2026. It is the brand's second plug-in hybrid vehicle, following the larger 9X.

== Overview ==
The Zeekr 8X entered pre-sales in China in March 2026 as a plug-in hybrid full-size luxury SUV positioned between the 7X and 9X in size and class.

The 8X uses Zeekr's "Powerful Elegance" design language used for their larger vehicles such as the 9X and 009. It prominently features a large waterfall-grille in the front available in chrome or body color, split headlight design and a dual-layer taillight design with 630 nm "ultra red" technology.

A performance variant known as the "8X Yaoying" features redesigned front and rear fascias and black trim elements around the vehicle.

The interior features a driver's display and central display as standard, with an optional passenger display. The rear cabin features a roof-mounted entertainment display, powered window blinds, and a 29-speaker Naim audio system. The trunk has a capacity of 1,133 L (40.0 cu ft), which can be expanded to 2,200 L (78 cu ft) when the second row seats are folded down.

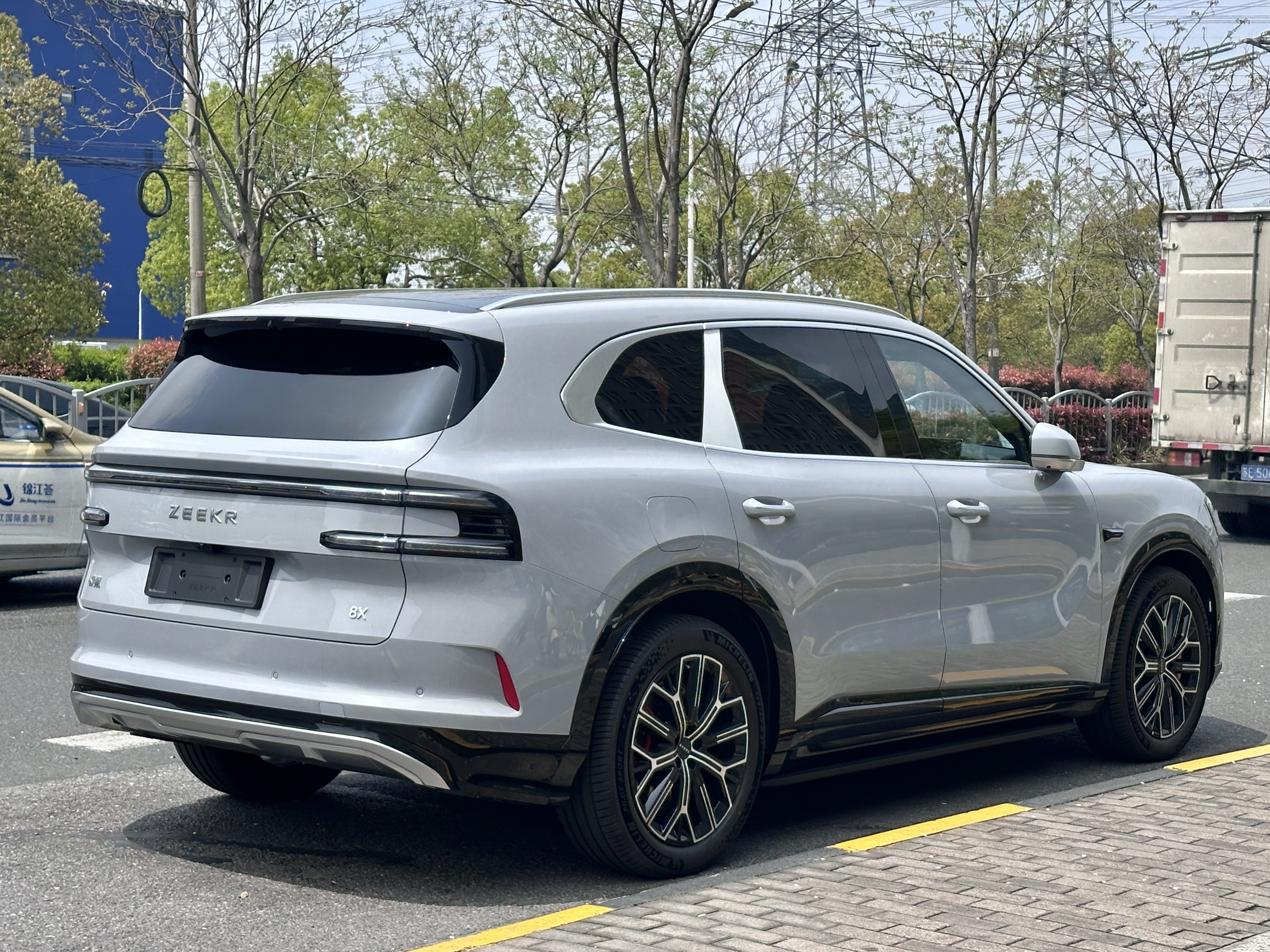
Rear view

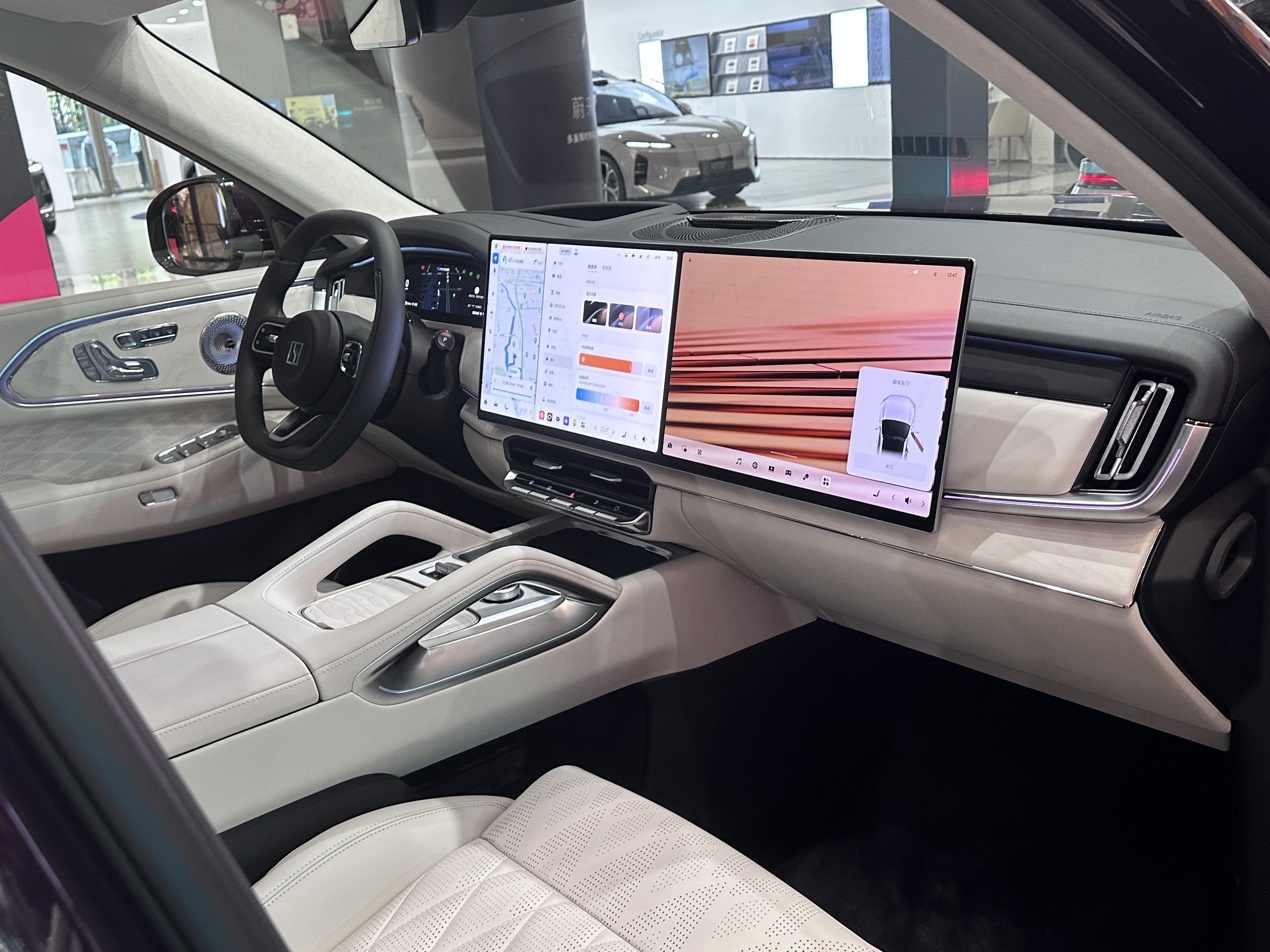
Interior

== Specifications ==
Similar to the 9X, the 8X uses the SEA Hybrid (Haohan Hybrid) powertrain based on the 900-volt SEA-S platform . This includes a 2.0-liter inline-four turbocharged engine producing 275 hp (205 kW; 279 PS), paired with either dual- or triple-motor configurations. Triple-motor versions produce a combined 1,030 kW (1,380 hp; 1,400 PS), accelerating from 0-100 km/h (62 mph) in 2.9 seconds and reaching a top speed of 230 km/h (140 mph). It is available with either a 55.1 kWh or 70 kWh CATL-sourced NMC battery, providing a WLTC and CLTC pure electric driving range of up to 328 km (204 mi) and 410 km (250 mi) respectively, as well as a combined CLTC range of 1,416 km (880 mi). It also allows for 6C charging, completing a charge from 20% to 80% in 9 minutes.

The "Haohan AI Digital Chassis" also features 48 V active anti-roll bars, dual-chamber air suspension, and continuous damping control.
