= Zeekr 007 =

Battery electric compact executive car

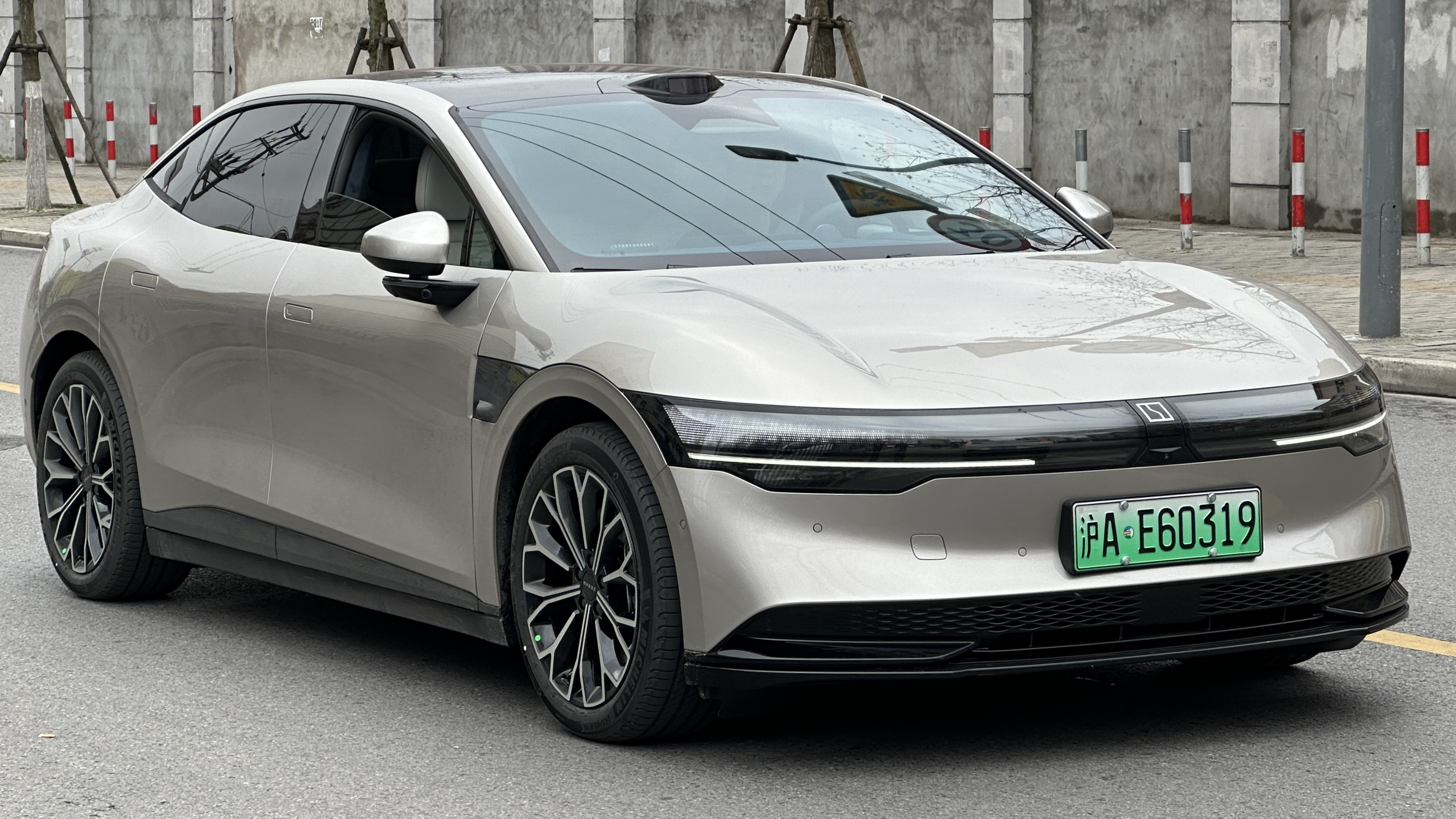

Overview
- Manufacturer: Zeekr
- Model code: CS1E (sedan); CC1E (shooting brake)
- Also called: Zeekr 7 GT (shooting brake, export)
- Production: December 2023 – present (sedan); April 2025 – present (shooting brake)
- Assembly: China: Ningbo
- Designer: Under the lead of Stefan Sielaff

Body and chassis
- Class: Mid-size car (D)
- Body style: 4-door sedan; 5-door shooting brake (007 GT)
- Layout: Rear-engine, rear-wheel-drive; Dual-motor, all-wheel-drive
- Platform: PMA2+ platform
- Related: Zeekr 7X; Geely Galaxy E8

Powertrain
- Power output: 310 kW (421 PS; 416 hp) (RWD); 475 kW (646 PS; 637 hp) (AWD)
- Battery: 75 kWh (270 MJ) 800-volt Lithium iron phosphate (LFP); 100 kWh (360 MJ) Lithium-Ternary (NMC)
- Electric range: up to 870 km (540 mi)

Dimensions
- Wheelbase: 2,920 mm (115.0 in) (sedan); 2,925 mm (115.2 in) (GT)
- Length: 4,865 mm (191.5 in) (sedan); 4,864 mm (191.5 in) (GT)
- Width: 1,900 mm (74.8 in)
- Height: 1,450 mm (57.1 in) (sedan); 1,445 mm (56.9 in) (GT)
- Curb weight: 2,525–2,655 kg (5,567–5,853 lb)

The Zeekr 007 (Chinese: 极氪007; pinyin: Jíkè 007) is a battery electric compact executive car by the premium electric vehicle brand Zeekr, owned by Geely Automobile Holdings. It was developed and engineered in Sweden and China The Zeekr 007 debuted on 17 November 2023 at the Guangzhou Auto Show, it is available as either a 4-door sedan, or a 5-door shooting brake or station wagon / estate marketed as the 007 GT in China or 7 GT in other markets, both of which are offered with battery electric powertrain options.

== Overview ==
The Zeekr 007 is equipped with LiDAR sensor, 12 cameras, and an Nvidia Orin-X chip to support the NZP high-speed autonomous pilot assist system that covers all Mainland China.

The interior of the Zeekr 007 features a 15.05-inch screen powered by Kr GPT AI and a Snapdragon 8295 chip from Qualcomm. The dashboard is formed with an LCD instrument panel and a 35.5-inch AR-HUD display, while the audio system of the Zeekr 007 includes a 7.1.4 acoustic system that consists of 21 speakers.

The entry-level rear wheel drive Zeekr 007 has a single electric motor powering the rear axle and produces 415 hp (310 kW), with acceleration from 0 to 100 km/h in 5.4 seconds. The 4WD version has two electric motors producing a combined 636 hp (475 kW), capable of a 0 to 100 km/h acceleration in 2.84 seconds. The 007 has two range options at launch, a 688 km (CLTC) version and a 870 km (CLTC) version. Being built on the PMA2+ platform, derived from the SEA architecture, the Zeekr 007 features a high-voltage 800V platform allowing the 007 to acquire a range of 610 km within 15 minutes of charge time.

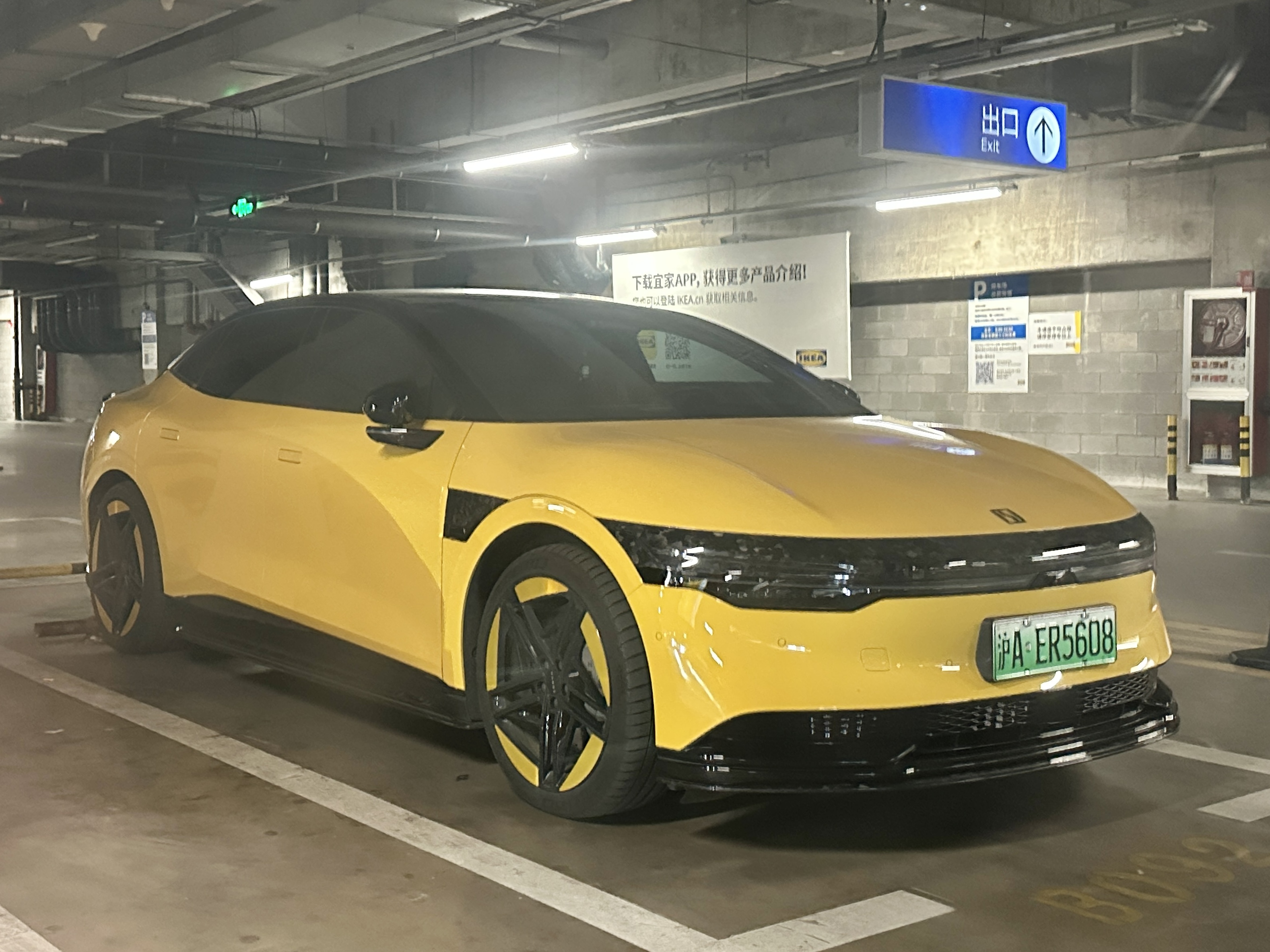
Zeekr 007 Performance

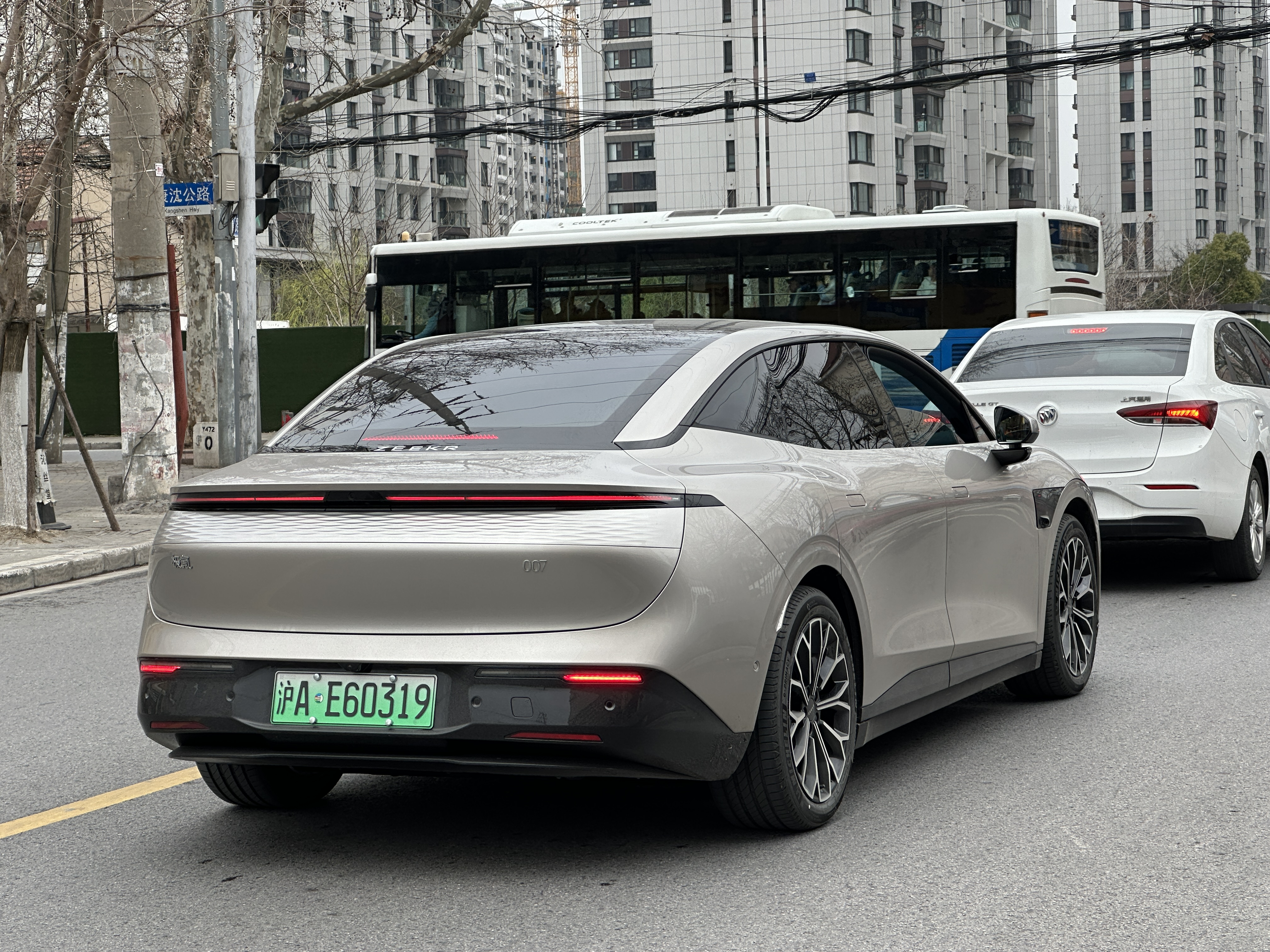
Rear view

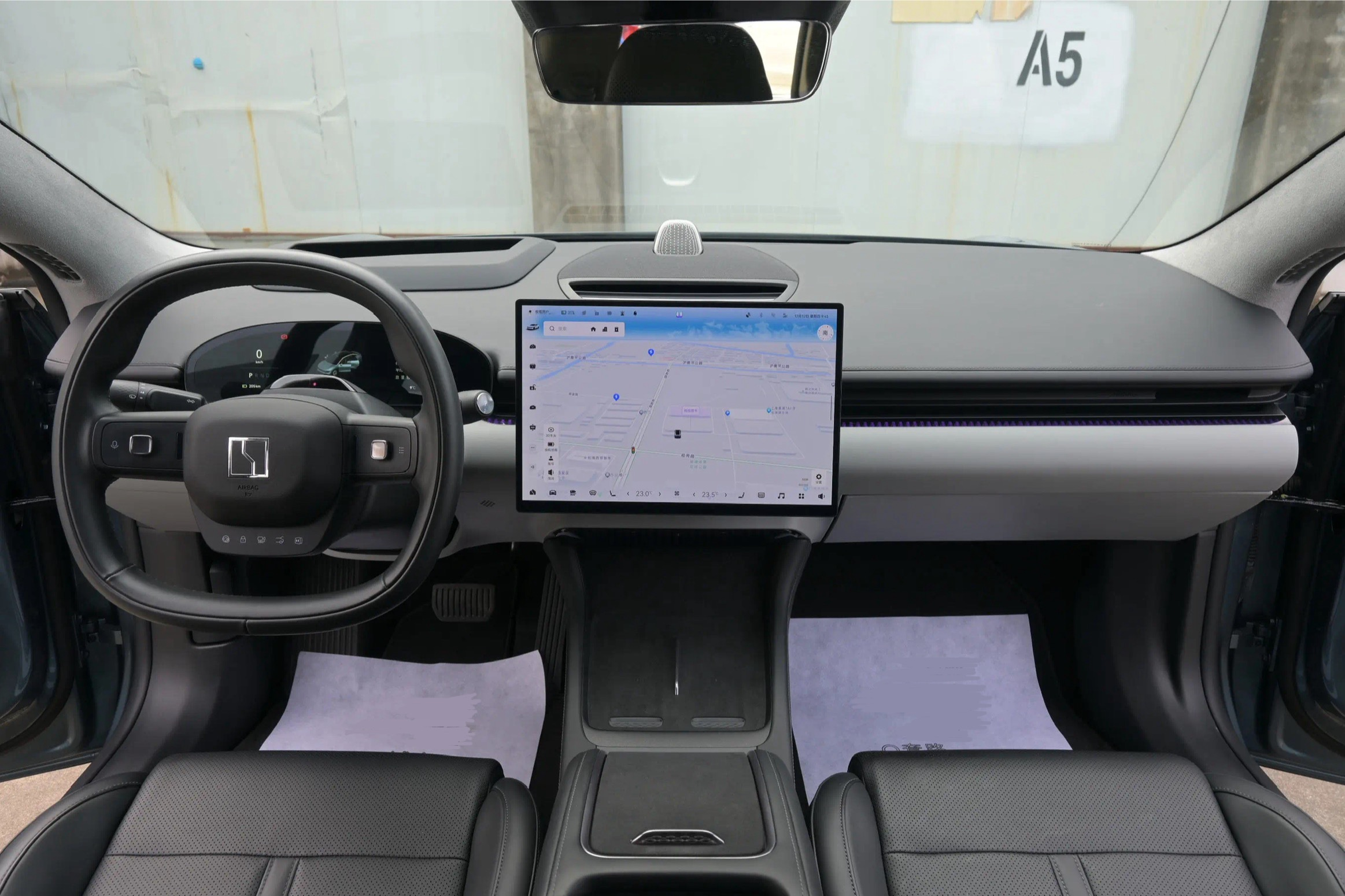
Interior

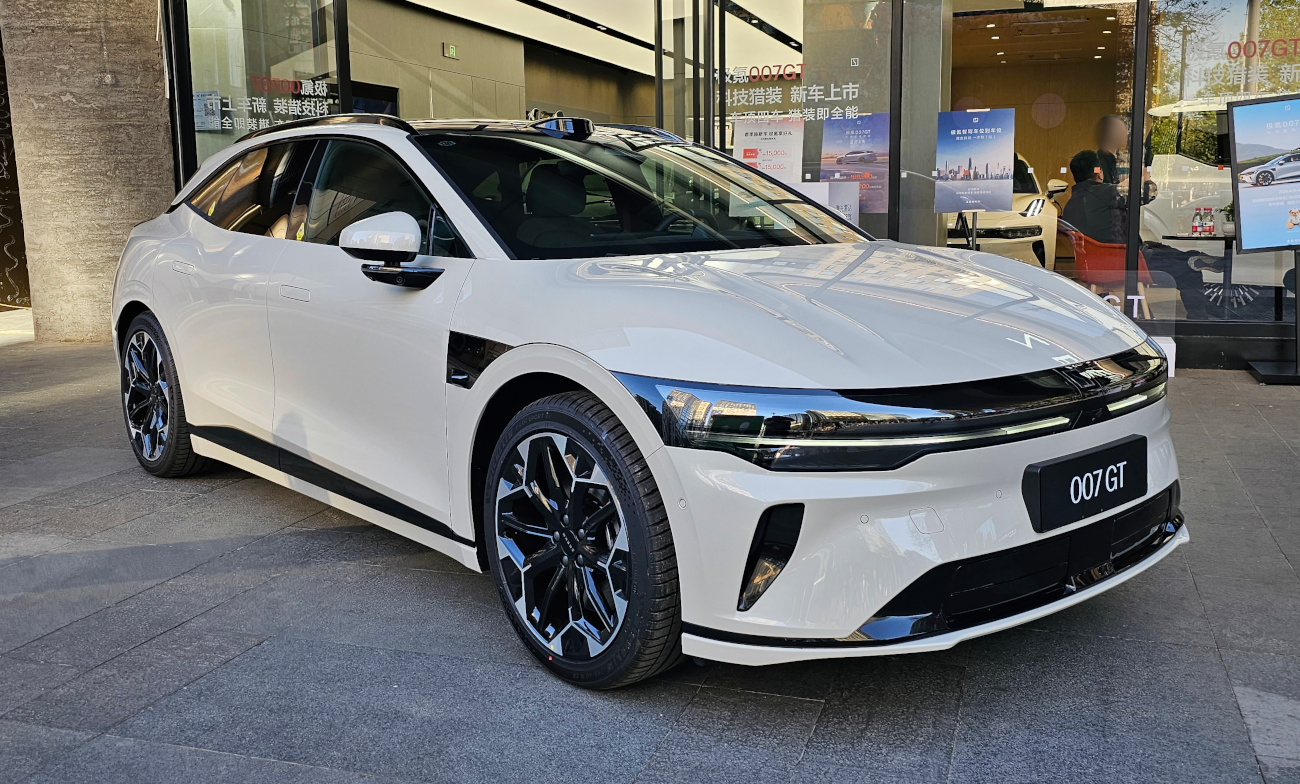
Zeekr 007 GT

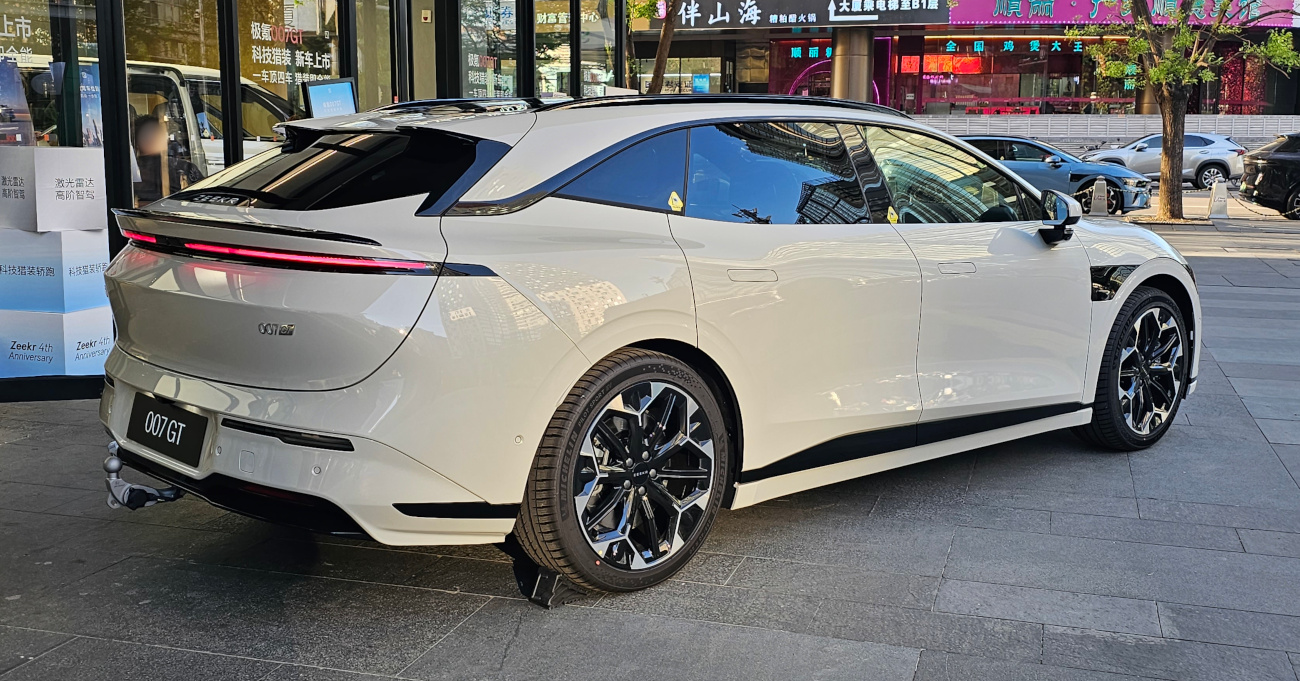
Rear view

== Safety ==
Euro NCAP test results Zeekr 7GT (2026)
Test	Score
Overall:	5 /5 stars
Safe driving	79%
Crash avoidance	89%
Crash protection	93%
Post crash	95%

== Sales ==
On 15 May 2025, Zeekr announced the delivery of the 10,000th 007GT at a customer handover ceremony at their factory 31 days after launch.

Year	China	
Year	007	007GT
2023	857	—
2024	46,903	—
2025	6,346	37,013
