= Zeekr 9X =

Plug-in hybrid full-size luxury SUV

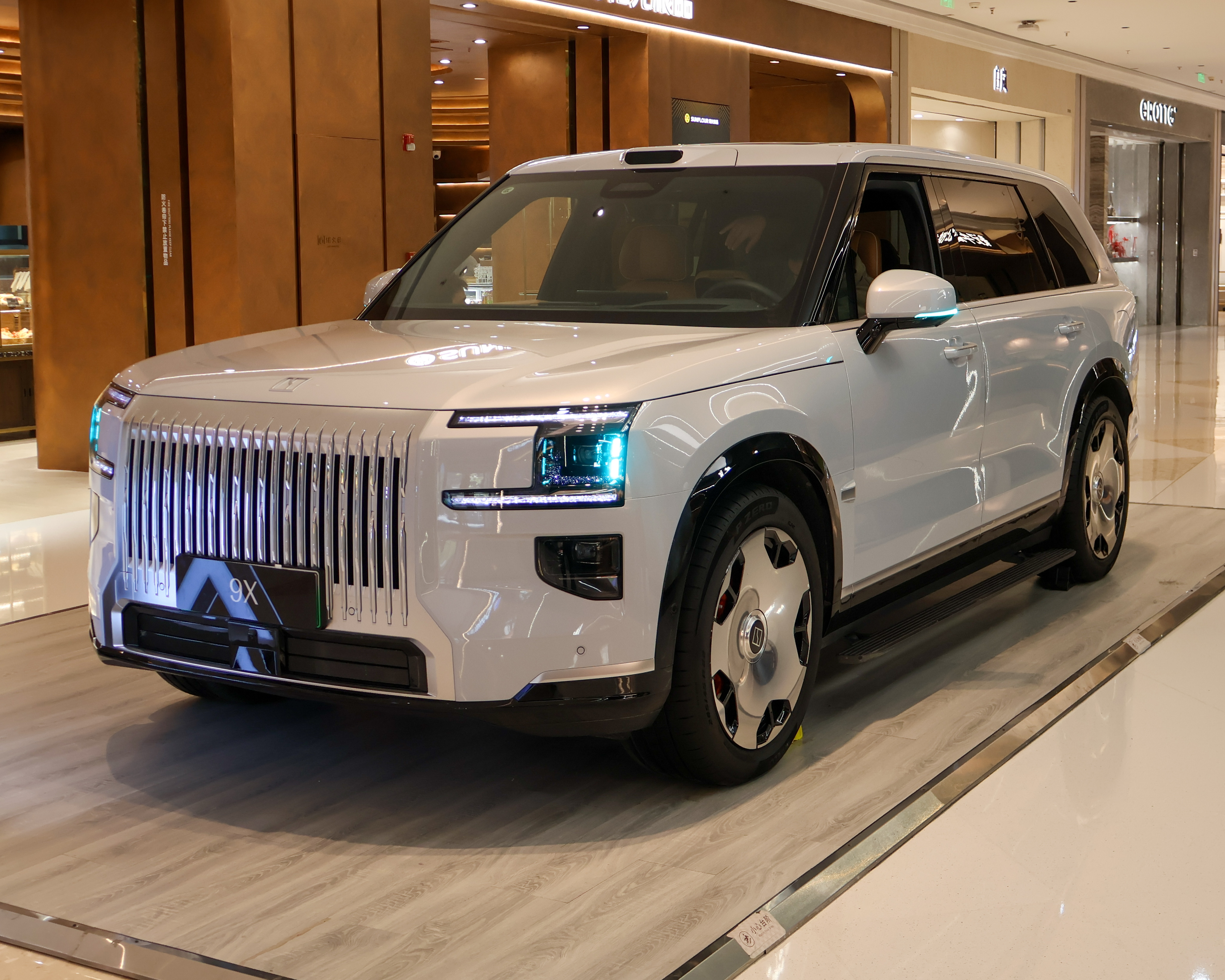

Overview
- Manufacturer: Zeekr (Geely Auto)
- Model code: EX1H
- Production: 2025–present
- Assembly: China: Ningbo, Zhejiang
- Designer: Jon Rådbrink under Stefan Sielaff

Body and chassis
- Class: Full-size luxury SUV
- Body style: 5-door SUV
- Layout: Front-engine, triple-motor, all-wheel drive
- Platform: SEA-R
- Related: Zeekr 8X

Powertrain
- Engine: Petrol plug-in hybrid:, 2.0 L DHE20-PFZ I4 turbo
- Electric motor: 290 kW TZ220QYA01 PMSM (front); 1× or 2× 370 kW TZ230XYC04 PMSM (rear)
- Power output: 660–1,030 kW (890–1,380 hp; 900–1,400 PS)
- Transmission: 1-speed DHT
- Hybrid drivetrain: Series-parallel plug-in hybrid
- Battery: 55.1 kWh NMC Freevoy CATL; 70 kWh NMC Freevoy CATL
- Range: 982–1,049 km (610–652 mi) (WLTP)
- Electric range: 230–302 km (143–188 mi) (WLTP); 288–380 km (179–236 mi) (CLTC)
- Plug-in charging: V2L: 6 kW AC; V2V: 60 kW DC; 500 kW DC

Dimensions
- Wheelbase: 3,169 mm (124.8 in)
- Length: 5,239 mm (206.3 in)
- Width: 2,029 mm (79.9 in)
- Height: 1,819 mm (71.6 in)
- Curb weight: 2,840–3,150 kg (6,260–6,940 lb)

The Zeekr 9X (Chinese: 极氪9X; pinyin: Jíkè 9X) is a plug-in hybrid full-size luxury SUV marketed by Zeekr in 2025. It is the brand's first plug-in hybrid vehicle, as previous Zeekr models are purely electric.

== Overview ==
The Zeekr 9X was first revealed at Auto Shanghai 2025, with pre-orders expected to open at the Chengdu Auto Show in August 2025. It is Zeekr's flagship SUV, based on the SEA-S (Haohan-S) modular architecture, is the first to use the ZEEA 3.0 electronics architecture, and uses the SEA Hybrid (Haohan Hybrid) system which provides a large battery capacity and fast charging.

A five-seater version was announced on 3 July, 2026 and made available to be ordered shortly after.

Rear view

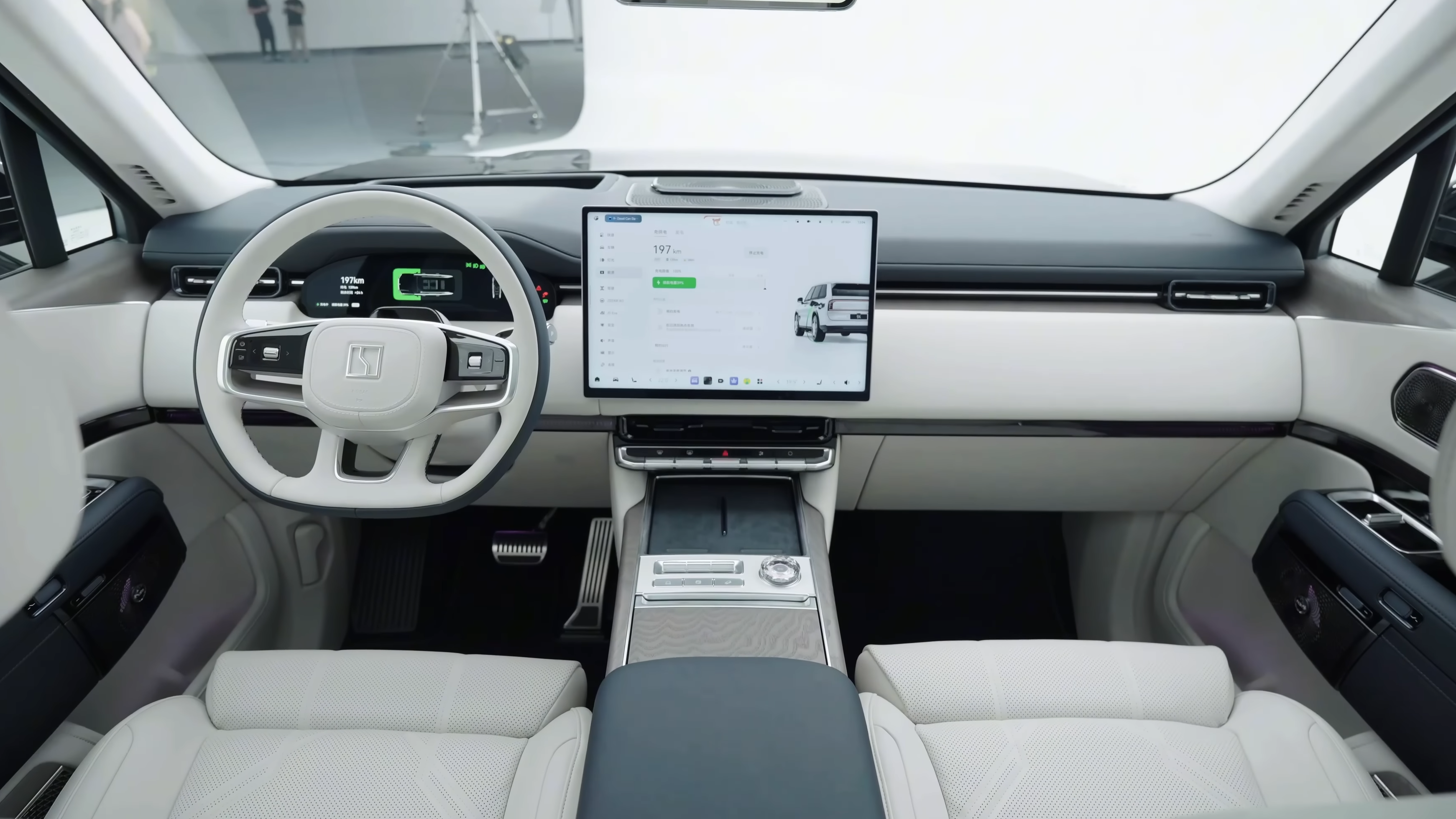
Interior

=== Design ===
Similar to other Zeekr models, the exterior and interior design of the 9X was done in Zeekr's Global Design and R&D Center at Gothenburg, under the lead of Stefan Sielaff, former head of design at Audi and Bentley. The front features a prominent grille with a similar design to that of the Zeekr 009 MPV, available in chrome or body color. The headlights and taillights are slim, featuring star-like patterns within the modules. Its roofline largely flat, and is complemented by a large silver trim piece that covers the D-pillar. Traditional door handles are used, and power deploying running boards are available. Multi-spoke and monoblock wheels of up to 22 inches are available.

== Specifications ==
91% of the 9X's chassis is composed of high-strength steel and aluminum, and features 10 structural beams with over 2,000 MPa (290 thousand psi) of tensile strength, allowing for a torsional rigidity of 41,600 Nm/degree. It is equipped with dual-chamber air suspension, dual-valve continuous damping control, and a 48V active anti-roll bar system. The air suspension has 110 mm (4 in) of total ride height adjustment for a maximum of 288 mm (11.3 in) of ground clearance, and can rise by 30 mm (1.2 in) in 7 seconds. It has a turning radius of 5.95 metres (19.5 ft).

The 9X is available with either a two-row five-seater layout or a three-row 2+2+2 six-seater layout. For the six-seater version, the front seats have speakers integrated into their headrests, and the second row seats have a 'zero-gravity' recline mode with extending footrests. The three-row model has a 470-litre (16.6 cu ft) rear cargo area, which expands to 2,148 litres (75.9 cu ft) with the seats folded down. Two-row models have 1,050 litres (37.1 cu ft) of rear cargo space, increasing to 2,441 litres (86.2 cu ft) with the rear seats folded down.

The interior features a 13-inch digital instrument panel supplemented by a 47-inch AR-HUD, a 16-inch OLED central infotainment touchscreen, a 16-inch OLED passenger infotainment display, a 6.3-inch rear seat control touchscreen, and an optional 17-inch OLED rear passenger entertainment display, all powered by two Qualcomm Snapdragon 8295 SoCs.

The 9X is equipped with Zeekr's G-Pilot H9 (Qianli Haohan H9) ADAS system, the first vehicle to do so, and consists of a 43-sensor suite: a roof-mounted 520-line long-range front-facing LiDAR; a total of 4 wide-angle solid-state LiDARs on each front fender, front bumper, and rear spoiler; 3 mmWave radars; and 13 cameras. It uses two redundant NVIDIA Thor-U SoCs for a total of 1,400 TOPS. Zeekr claims the system has industry-first features such as General Automated Evasion System (G-AES) and full-capacity Vehicle-to-Parking (V2P) self driving, and says the system is L3 ready. Base versions of the 9X will be equipped with the G-Pilot H7 system, which uses fewer sensors and uses a single Nvidia Thor-U SoC for 700 TOPS.

== Powertrain ==
The Zeekr 9X is available exclusively as a plug-in hybrid, using the SEA Hybrid (Haohan Hybrid) system and 900-volt silicon carbide power electronics.

It uses a 1,974 cc (1.974 L; 120.5 cu in) turbocharged inline-four petrol engine which outputs 271 hp (202 kW; 275 PS) net power (275 hp (205 kW; 279 PS) gross power) and has a claimed peak thermal efficiency over 46%, and is paired with a 1-speed series-parallel DHT transmission. It is equipped with a 290 kW (389 hp; 394 PS) motor powering the front wheels and two 370 kW (496 hp; 503 PS) motors powering each rear wheel, for a total combined output of 1,030 kW (1,381 hp; 1,400 PS). It achieves a 0–100 km/h (62 mph) time of 3.1 seconds, and a top speed of 240 km/h (149 mph). Zeekr claims that the difference in 0–100 km/h (62 mph) times when the battery is fully discharged will be 0.2 seconds slower than when at full charge.

The 9X is available with a choice of two battery packs, a base 55.1 kWh pack providing up to 235 km (146 mi) of CLTC range, or a 70 kWh NMC pack supplied by CATL which provides 302 km (188 mi) of range. The 70 kWh pack is capable of 6C charging from 20–80% in 9 minutes.

Specifications (China)
Model	Battery		Engine	Power	Torque	Electric range		20–80% charge	0–100 km/h (62 mph)	Top speed	Curb weight
Model	Type	Weight	Engine	Power	Torque	WLTP	CLTC	20–80% charge	0–100 km/h (62 mph)	Top speed	Curb weight
20" wheel	55.1 kWh Freevoy NMC CATL	340 kg (750 lb)	DHE20-PFZ 1974cc I4 turbo 202 kW (271 hp; 275 PS)	885 hp (660 kW; 897 PS)	935 N⋅m (690 lb⋅ft)	235 km (146 mi)	300 km (186 mi)	9 min	3.9 s	240 km/h (149 mph)	2,840 kg (6,261 lb)
Dual-motor	55.1 kWh Freevoy NMC CATL	340 kg (750 lb)	DHE20-PFZ 1974cc I4 turbo 202 kW (271 hp; 275 PS)	885 hp (660 kW; 897 PS)	935 N⋅m (690 lb⋅ft)	230 km (143 mi)	288 km (179 mi)	9 min	3.9 s	240 km/h (149 mph)	2,970 kg (6,548 lb)
Dual-motor	70 kWh Freevoy NMC CATL	408 kg (899 lb)	DHE20-PFZ 1974cc I4 turbo 202 kW (271 hp; 275 PS)	885 hp (660 kW; 897 PS)	935 N⋅m (690 lb⋅ft)	302 km (188 mi)	380 km (236 mi)	9 min	4.2 s	240 km/h (149 mph)	3,045 kg (6,713 lb)
Tri-motor	70 kWh Freevoy NMC CATL	408 kg (899 lb)	DHE20-PFZ 1974cc I4 turbo 202 kW (271 hp; 275 PS)	1,381 hp (1,030 kW; 1,400 PS)	1,410 N⋅m (1,040 lb⋅ft)	280 km (174 mi)	355 km (221 mi)	9 min	3.1 s	240 km/h (149 mph)	3,150 kg (6,945 lb)

== Sales ==
On 21 October 2026, Zeekr announced the 9X had achieved total deliveries of over 85,000 one year after launch, with an average transaction price over ¥530,000 RMB.

Year	China
2025	18,980
