= Zeekr X =

Battery electric compact crossover SUV

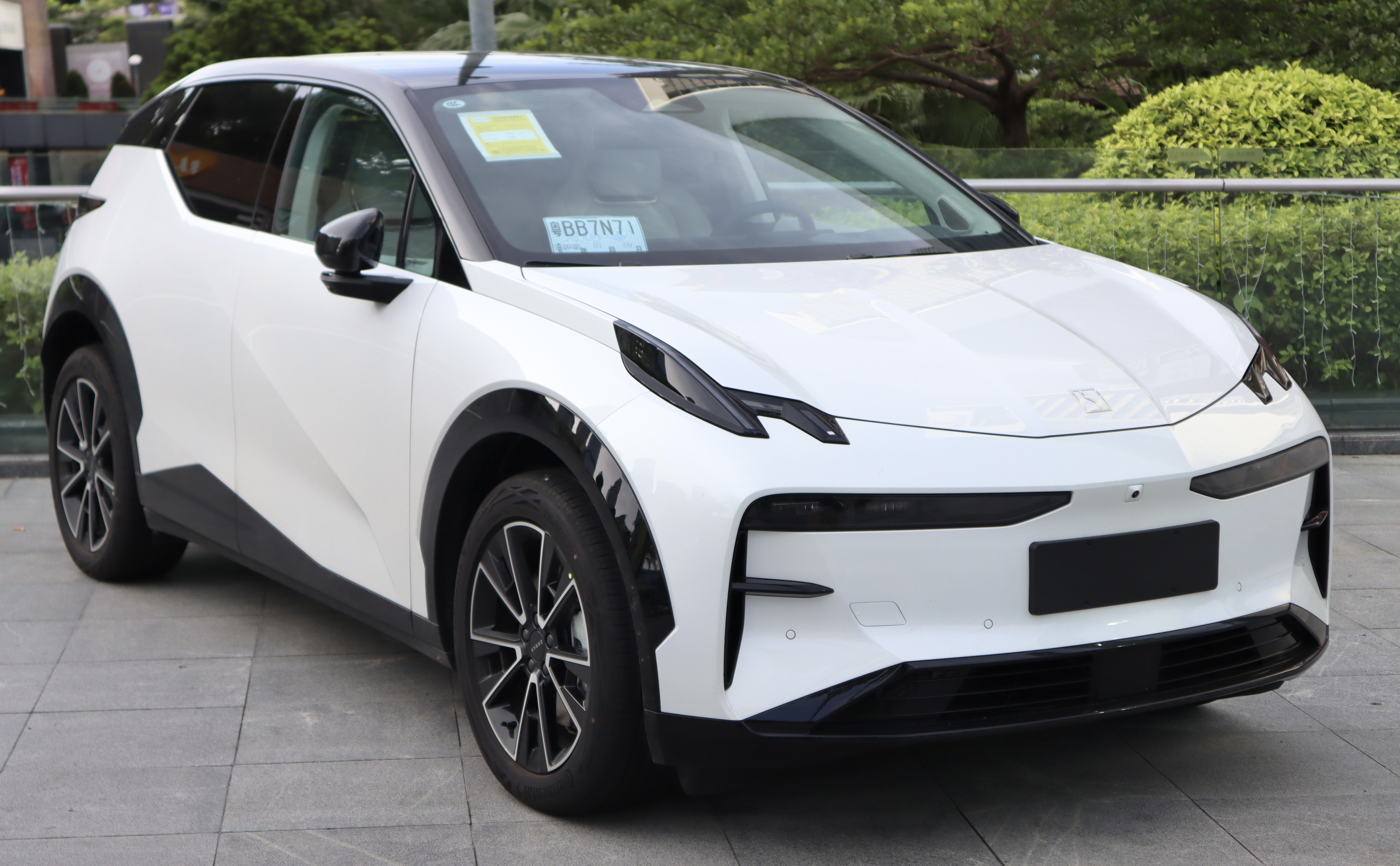

Overview
- Manufacturer: Zeekr (Geely Auto)
- Model code: BX1E
- Production: June 2023 – present
- Assembly: China: Chengdu (ZAMC)
- Designer: List: Stefan Sielaff (Head of Design); Jon Rådbrink (chief exterior designer); Robert Knutsson (exterior designer); Pontus Merkel (interior designer)

Body and chassis
- Class: Compact crossover SUV (C)
- Body style: 5-door SUV
- Layout: Rear-motor, rear-wheel-drive; Dual-motors, four-wheel-drive
- Platform: Sustainable Experience Architecture 2 (SEA2)
- Related: Smart #1; Volvo EX30; Lynk & Co Z20

Powertrain
- Electric motor: 1× or 2× permanent magnet synchronous
- Power output: Pre-Facelift: 200–350 kW (272–476 PS; 268–469 hp); Facelift; 250–365 kW (340–496 PS; 335–489 hp)
- Transmission: 1-speed direct-drive
- Battery: Pre-facelift; 49 kWh CATL LFP; 69 kWh CATL NCM lithium-ion; Facelift; 61 kWh ZEEKR Golden LFP; 66 kWh CATL NCM Prismatic cells lithium-ion
- Electric range: 512–560 km (318–348 mi) (CLTC); 470–540 km (290–340 mi) (NEDC)
- Plug-in charging: 22 kW (AC); 150 kW (DC)

Dimensions
- Wheelbase: 2,750 mm (108.3 in)
- Length: 4,450 mm (175.2 in)
- Width: 1,836 mm (72.3 in)
- Height: 1,572 mm (61.9 in)
- Kerb weight: 1,945 kg (4,288 lb) (4WD); 1,885 kg (4,156 lb) (RWD)

The Zeekr X (Chinese: 极氪X; pinyin: Jíkè X) is a battery electric compact crossover SUV developed and produced by Zeekr, a premium NEV brand of Geely. It is the third production vehicle produced by the brand and was launched in April 2023. The model is based on the Geely developed Sustainable Experience Architecture (SEA) electric vehicle platform shared with the Smart #1, and the electric motors and batteries are made by VREMT (Viridi E-Mobility Technology), a company fully owned by Geely, which also produces the motors and batteries for Smart #1.

== Overview ==
The production Zeekr X was unveiled on 12 April 2023. In China, the Zeekr X is available in three trim levels with either a single motor rear-wheel-drive or dual motor all-wheel-drive drivetrain. Two "YOU" trims are offered with a dual-motor setup paired with a 5-seater configuration or a single-motor setup paired with a premium 4-seater configuration. The single-motor YOU trim could be had with an optional dual-motor upgrade.

The interior of the Zeekr X features a small instrument panel and an AR-HUD in front of the steering wheel, with a 14.6-inch floating screen shared with other Zeekr models placed in the centre of the interior that can move towards the passenger side. The interior could also be had with a minifridge. The trunk volume of the Zeekr X varies from 12.8 cubic feet (362 liters) with all seats in default position to 41.7 cu ft (1,182 L) with the rear seats folded.

The model 2025 has a version with a 49 kWh LFP (short blades) battery that will be 25% cheaper in China than the previous entry model version.

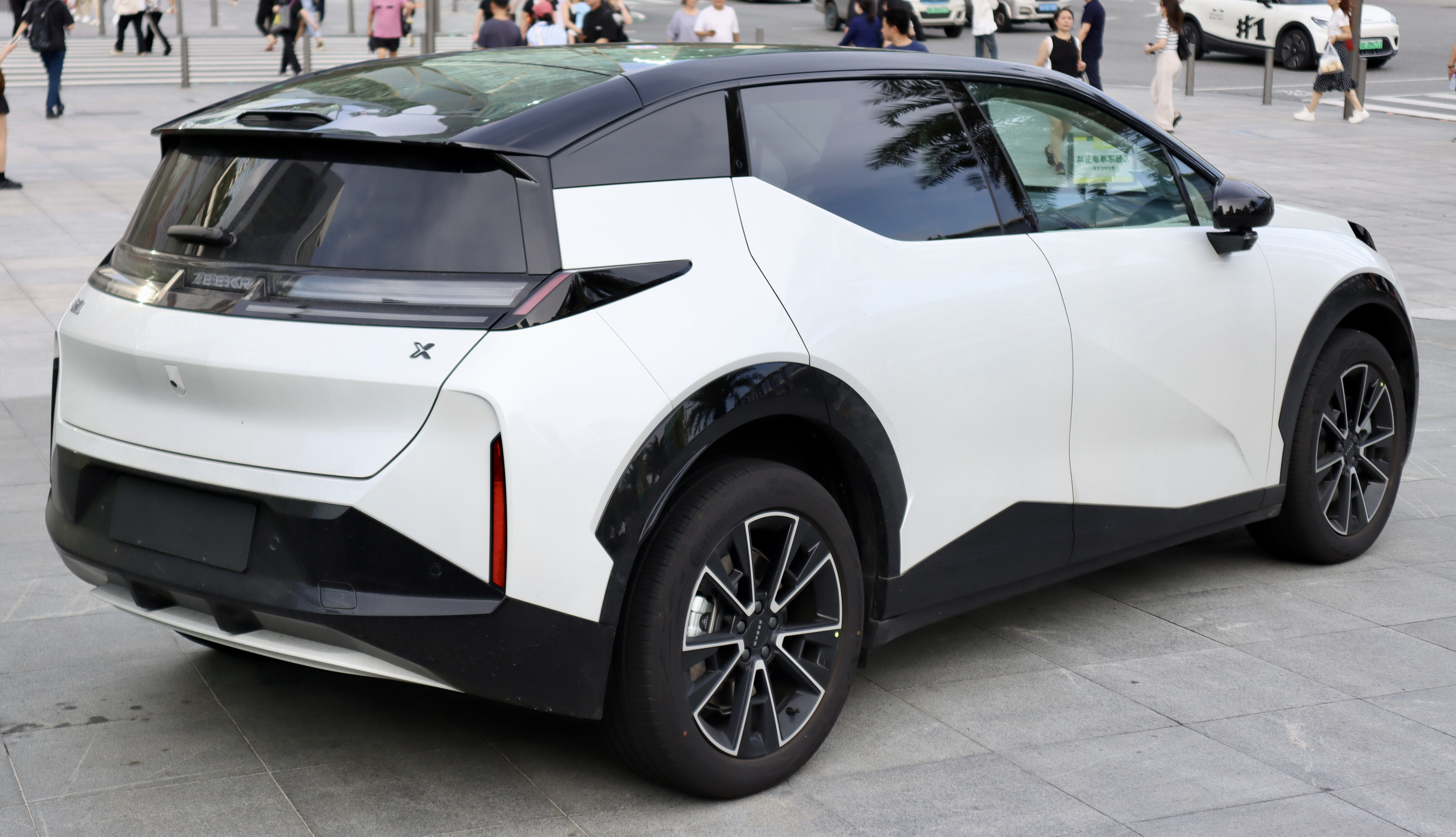
Rear view

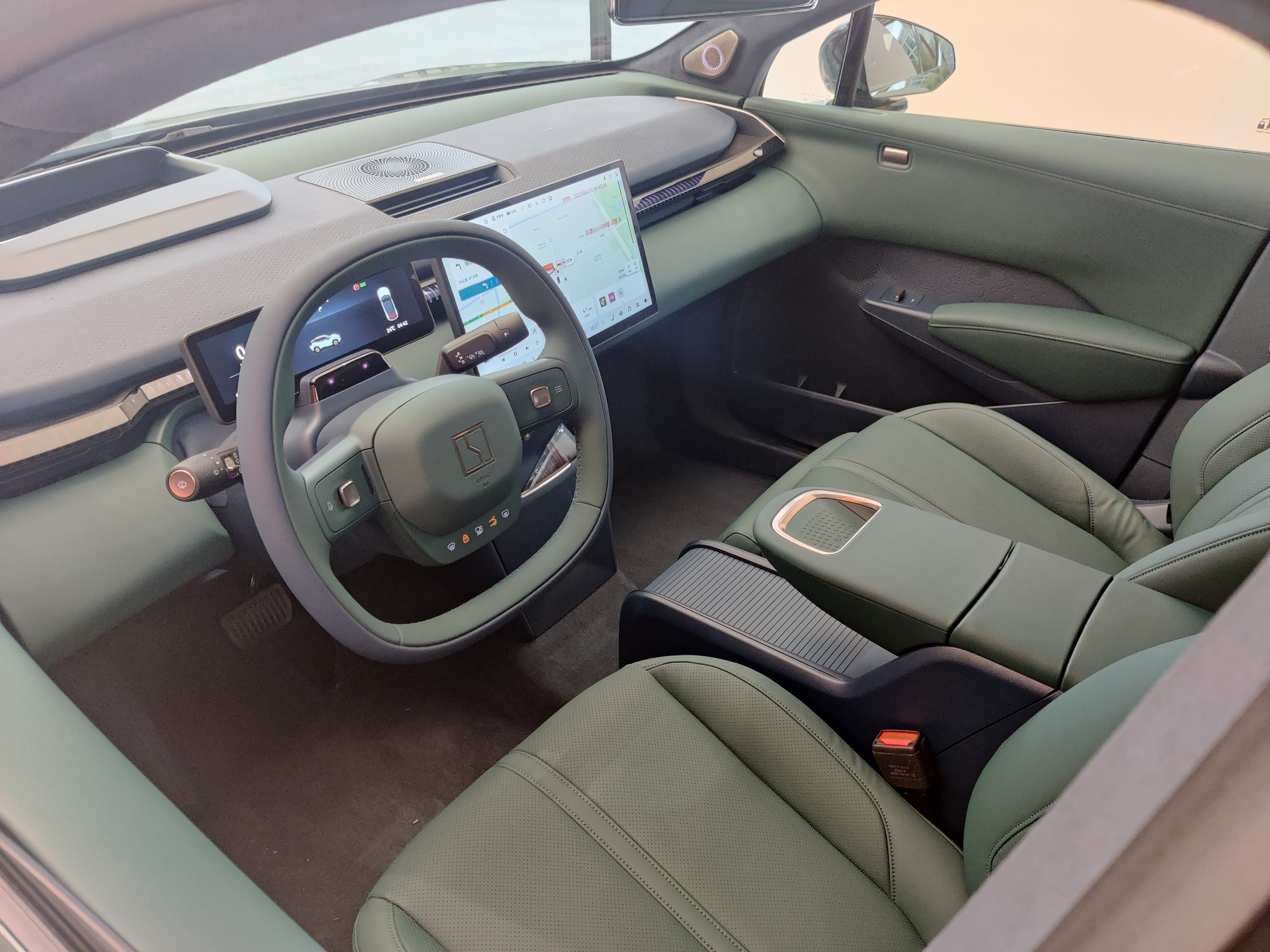
Interior

== Powertrain ==
The Zeekr X is solely powered by a 66 kWh NMC lithium-ion battery produced by CATL Geely Sichuan, which is claimed to deliver 500–560 km (311–348 mi) of range.

The dual motor powertrain produces up to 315 kW (422 hp; 428 PS) and 543 N⋅m (55.4 kg⋅m; 400 lb⋅ft) of torque, capable of a 0–100 km/h (0–62 mph) acceleration in 3.7 seconds. It is also available as a 5-seater vehicle or a more premium 4-seater setup. The entry-level 5-seater rear-drive ME version produces 200 kW (268 hp; 272 PS), and has a CLTC range of 560 km (348 mi). Acceleration from 0–100 km/h (0–62 mph) is 5.8 seconds.

Spec Model	Year of introduction	Battery	Battery capacity	Range (WLTP)	Power	Torque	0–100 km/h (0–62 mph)	Top speed	Drive
Single Motor	November 2024 -	LFP	49.0 kWh	420km (CLTC)	268 hp (200 kW; 272 PS)	343 N⋅m (253 lb⋅ft)	5.8 s		RWD
Single Motor	June 2023 –	Nickel manganese cobalt	69.0 kWh (248 MJ)	440 km (270 mi)	268 hp (200 kW; 272 PS)	343 N⋅m (253 lb⋅ft)	5.6 s	180 km/h (110 mph)	RWD
Dual Motor	June 2023 –	Nickel manganese cobalt	69.0 kWh (248 MJ)	400 km (250 mi)	428 hp (319 kW; 434 PS)	543 N⋅m (400 lb⋅ft)	3.8 s	180 km/h (110 mph)	AWD

== Markets ==
=== Asia ===
==== Malaysia ====
The Zeekr X was launched in Malaysia on 6 December 2024, with two variants: RWD Premium and AWD Flagship, both variants use the 66 kWh NMC battery pack.

In June 2026, the Zeekr X was updated for the 2026 model year which saw new exterior colours, new alloy wheel designs, equipment changes, and upgraded powertrains with the RWD variant received a new 61 kWh NMC battery pack.

==== Philippines ====
The Zeekr X was launched in the Philippines on 29 June 2024, as part of Zeekr's entry to the Philippines market. It is available with two variants: Premium and Privilege, both variants use the 66 kWh NMC battery pack.

==== Singapore ====
The Zeekr X was launched in Singapore on 2 August 2024, with two variants: Standard RWD and Flagship AWD, both variants use the 66 kWh NMC battery pack.

==== Thailand ====
The Zeekr X was launched in Thailand on 11 July 2024, as the first Zeekr model to be marketed in Thailand. Fully imported from China, it is available with two variants: Standard RWD and Flagship AWD, both variants use the 69 kWh battery pack.

In July 2026, the Zeekr X was updated for the 2026 model year which saw new exterior and interior colour options, new alloy wheel designs, the inclusion of new features, a redesigned interior, and upgraded powertrains with the RWD and AWD variants received new 61 kWh LFP and 66 kWh NMC battery packs respectively.

=== Europe ===
The Zeekr X was released in Europe in June 2023, as part of Zeekr's introduction to the European market starting in the Netherlands and Sweden, and first batch deliveries commenced in September 2023.

=== Oceania ===
==== Australia ====
The Zeekr X went on sale in Australia on 27 September 2024, as the first Zeekr model to be marketed in Australia. It is available with RWD (available with the Convenience Package) and AWD variants, both variants use the 66 kWh LFP battery pack.

In April 2026, the Zeekr X was updated for the 2026 model year with equipment changes, features from the previously available Convenience Package became standard on the RWD variant, upgraded powertrains with the RWD variant received a new 61 kWh LFP battery pack, and the AWD variant was renamed to Performance AWD.

==== New Zealand ====
The Zeekr X went on sale in New Zealand on 21 August 2025, as part of Zeekr's introduction to the New Zealand market under NordEast Distributors. It is available with RWD and AWD variants, powered by the 66 kWh lithium-ion NCM battery pack.

In July 2026, the Zeekr X was updated for the 2026 model year which saw new exterior and interior colour options, new alloy wheel designs, the inclusion of new features, updated interior materials and upgraded powertrains.

== Safety ==
=== ANCAP ===
ANCAP test results Zeekr X (2024, aligned with Euro NCAP)
Test	Points	%
Overall:	5 /5 stars	
Adult occupant:	36.76	91%
Child occupant:	44.81	87%
Pedestrian:	52.96	84%
Safety assist:	15.19	84%

=== ASEAN NCAP ===
ASEAN NCAP test results Zeekr X (2025)
Test	Points
Overall:	5 /5 stars
Adult occupant:	40.00
Child occupant:	17.14
Safety assist:	20.00
Motorcyclist Safety:	17.50

=== Euro NCAP ===
Euro NCAP test results Zeekr X Long Range RWD (LHD) (2024)
Test	Points	%
Overall:	5 /5 stars	
Adult occupant:	36.8	91%
Child occupant:	44.5	90%
Pedestrian:	53.5	84%
Safety assist:	15.1	83%

== Sales ==
Year	China	Australia
2023	22,372	
2024	13,316	
2025	7,759	665
