= Stefan Sielaff =

Germany car designer

- Born: 1962 (age 63–64); Munich, Germany
- Occupation: Car designer

Stefan Sielaff (born 1962 in Munich) is a German car designer currently with Geely Auto Group. He has spent the majority of his career with Audi, with a short three-year break with Mercedes-Benz, he also joined Bentley as design director from 2015 to 2021.

== Career ==
Sielaff initially joined Audi in 1984 as a student intern. He was awarded an Audi scholarship and went to London to study vehicle design at the Royal College of Art (RCA) where he was awarded the MDes (RCA) qualification. While at the RCA he won the Triplex prize for his ACID (Advanced Concept: Induction Drive) three-wheeler project which bridged the gap between motorcycle and sports car and included innovative glazing.

Immediately upon completing his course in 1990 he returned to Audi where he worked on interiors at Audi's Ingolstadt headquarters before moving to Audi and Volkswagen interiors in Munich. In 1995 he moved to Sitges, Spain before returning to Munich in 1997 to run the Audi Design Centre and then quickly moved to Ingolstadt to become head of interior design of Audi.

In 2003, Sielaff moved to rival Mercedes-Benz to become the design director of Interior Competence Center in Sindelfingen. He returned to Audi in 2006 to be head of Audi Design under Walter de Silva to replace retiring head Gerhard Pfefferle.

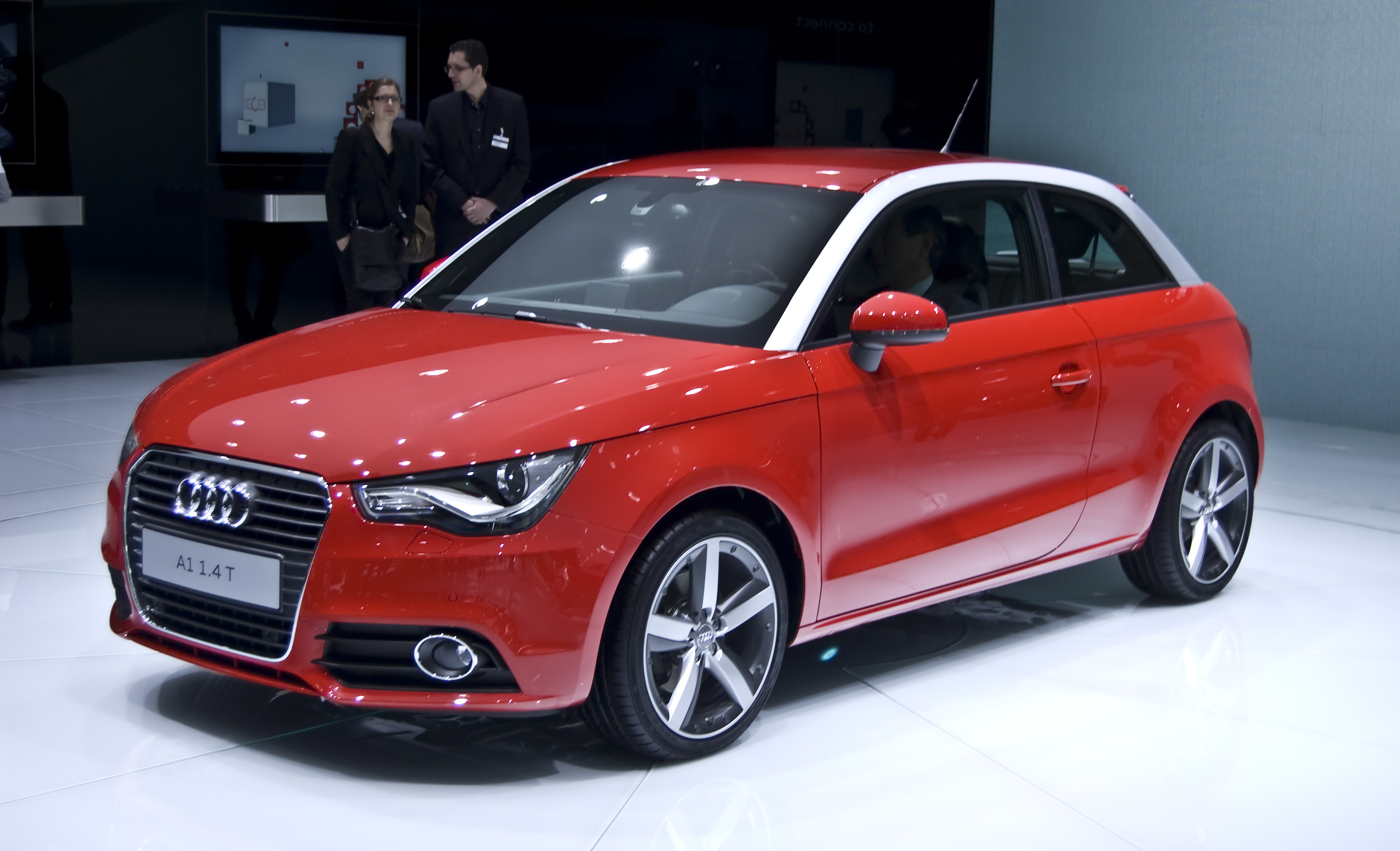
Audi A1

In September 2021, Sielaff was appointed as Vice President of Global Design at Geely Auto. He will be based in Gothenburg, Sweden.

== Significant designs ==
- Audi Quattro Spyder Concept
- Audi A1
- Audi A7 (2010)
- Mercedes-Benz CLS
- Bentley Continental GT (2018)
- Bentley Flying Spur (2019)
- Zeekr 009
- Zeekr X
- Zeekr 007
- Zeekr 7X
- Zeekr Mix
- Zeekr 9X
- Zeekr 8X

== Other roles ==
Sielaff is a member of the Advisory Board of the School of Textiles & Design at Reutlingen University.
