= Geely Xingyue L =

Mid-size crossover SUV

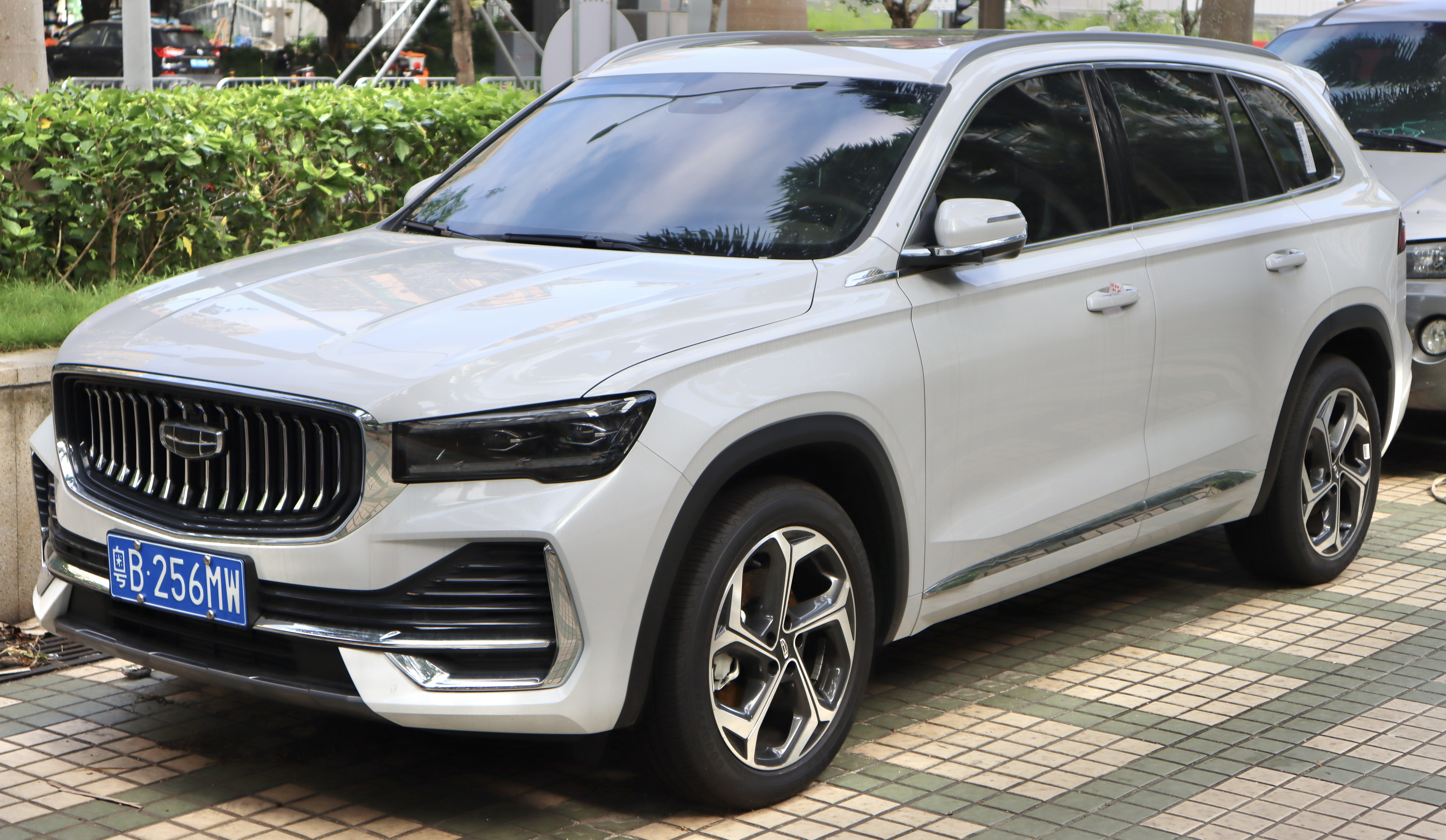

Overview
- Manufacturer: Geely Auto
- Production: 2021–present

Body and chassis
- Class: Mid-size crossover SUV (D)
- Body style: 5-door SUV

The Geely Xingyue L (Chinese: 吉利星越L; pinyin: Jílì xīng yuè L, meaning "star cross") is a mid-size crossover SUV produced by Geely Auto. It is marketed as the Geely Monjaro in export markets.

In June 2024, Renault Korea introduced a redesigned version of the Xingyue L called the Renault Grand Koleos, which is produced in South Korea for the local market.

== First generation (KX11, 2020) ==
Geely Xingyue L
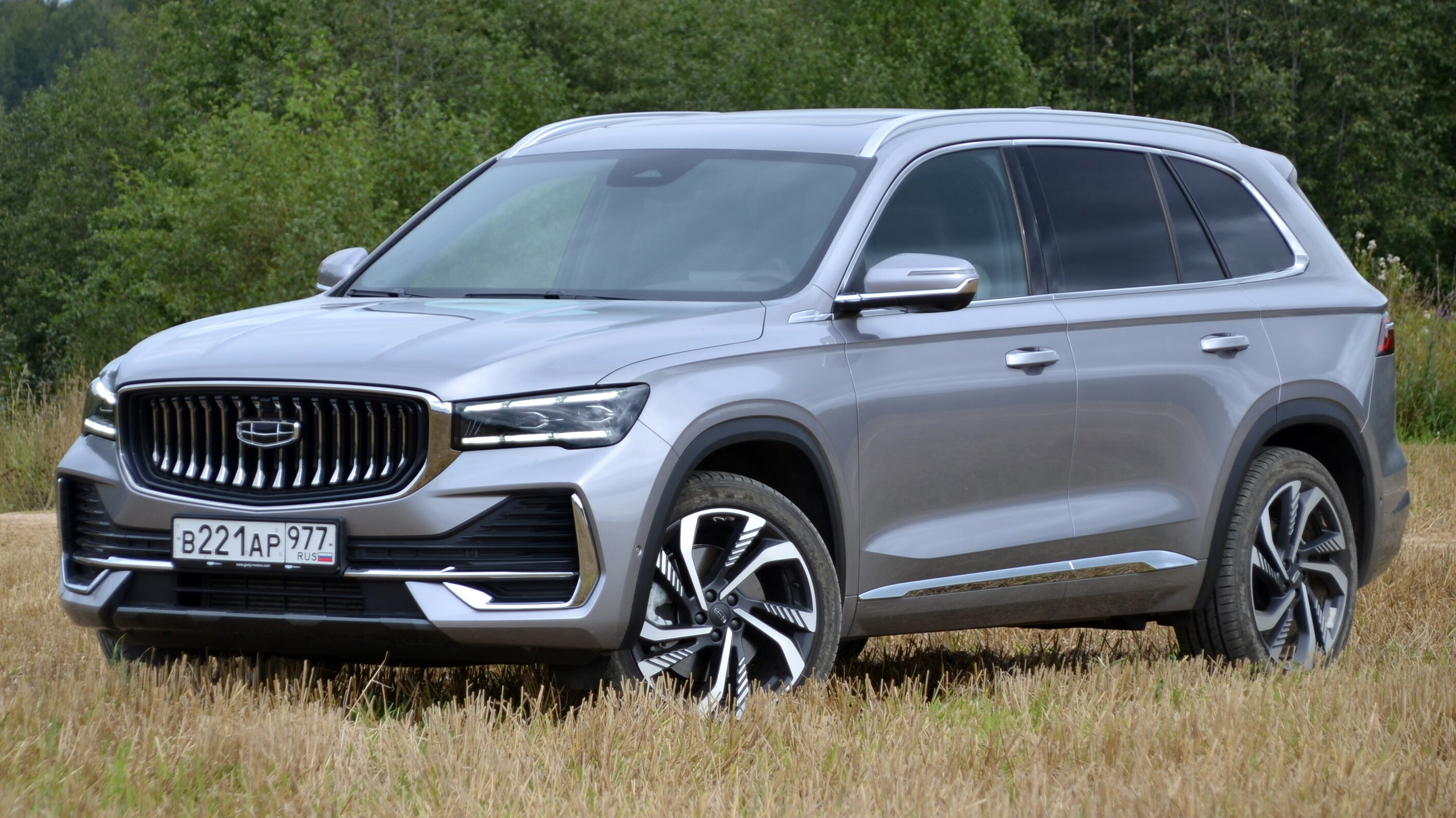

Overview
- Model code: KX11
- Also called: Geely Monjaro (export); Volga K50 (Russia)
- Production: 2021–present
- Assembly: China: Xi'an, Shaanxi
- Designer: Zi Ye (exterior); Wenli Zhang (Interior)

Body and chassis
- Layout: Front-engine, front-wheel-drive; Front-engine, all-wheel-drive
- Platform: Compact Modular Architecture
- Related: Renault Koleos / Grand Koleos; Geely Xingyue S / Tugella; Renault Filante

Powertrain
- Engine: Petrol: 2.0 L Volvo JLH-4G20TDB turbo I4; Petrol hybrid: 1.5 L DHE15-ESZ turbo I3; 1.5 L BHE15-BFZ turbo I4
- Electric motor: 11-in-1 High performance motor
- Power output: 160–175 kW (215–235 hp; 218–238 PS) (2.0 L); 180 kW (241 hp; 245 PS) (1.5 L Hi-X / Hi-F); 150 kW (201 hp; 204 PS) (1.5 L Hi-P); 167 kW (224 hp; 227 PS) (1.5 L i-HEV)
- Transmission: 7-speed DCT (FWD); 8-speed automatic (AWD); 3-speed DHT (HEV)
- Hybrid drivetrain: Power-split hybrid (Hi-X); i–HEV / Thor Hi–F Intelligent Dual Hybrid (Hi-F / i-HEV); PHEV (Hi-P)
- Battery: 1.6 - 1.8 kWh NMC (i-HEV); 41.2 kWh NMC (useable 39.6 kWh) (PHEV)

Dimensions
- Wheelbase: 2,845 mm (112.0 in)
- Length: 4,770 mm (187.8 in)
- Width: 1,895 mm (74.6 in)
- Height: 1,689 mm (66.5 in)

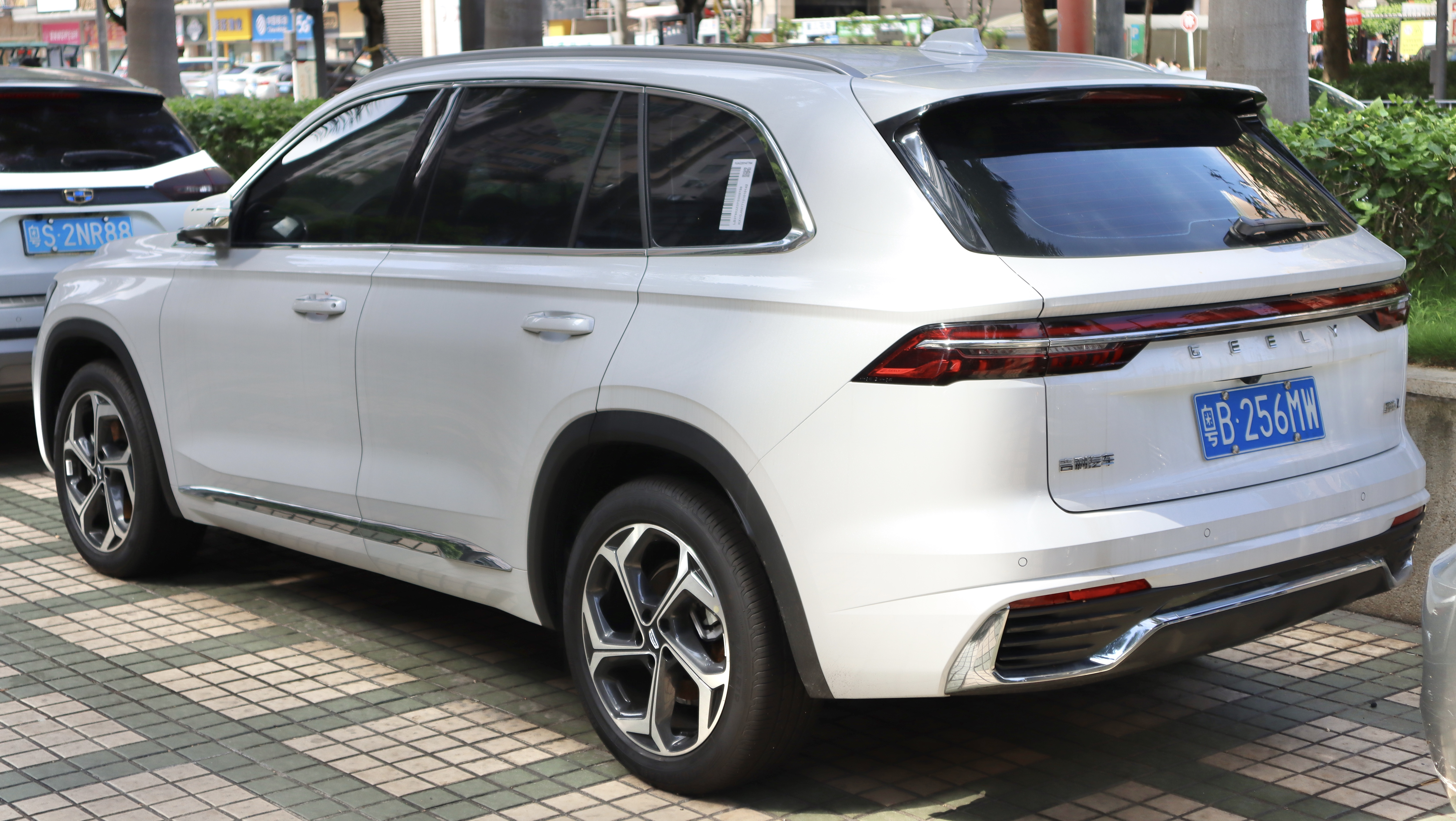
Rear view

The Geely Xingyue L was code named the KX11 during development phase, and was designed by the Geely Design Global Center in Shanghai, China.

The Geely Xingyue L rides on the CMA platform shared with the Geely Xingyue fastback compact crossover while being significantly larger and is positioned as a mid-size crossover SUV. According to Geely, the L means Larger (更大), Luxury (豪华), and Liberate (颠覆).

=== Powertrain ===
The Geely Xingyue L is powered by the Drive-E series VEP4 2.0-litre inline-4 turbocharged injection engine from Volvo. The engine is available as the 2.0TD-T4 Evo and 2.0TD-T5 variants, with the 2.0TD-T4 Evo developing 218 hp (163 kW; 221 PS) and 325 N⋅m (240 lb⋅ft) of torque, and the more powerful 2.0TD-T5 variant developing 238 hp (177 kW; 241 PS) and 350 N⋅m (258 lb⋅ft). Transmissions are a 7-speed DCT for the 2.0TD-T4 Evo engine and a 8-speed from Aisin for the 2.0TD-T5 engine.

The 2.0TD high output model has a 0–100 km/h (0–62 mph) acceleration time of 7.7 seconds, while the 2.0TD middle output model has a 0–100 km/h acceleration time of 7.9 seconds, with a braking distance of 37.37 m (122.6 ft).

=== Variants ===
==== Xingyue L Hi-X/ Hi-F ====
Geely unveiled the Xingyue L Hi-X (later renamed to Hi-F) hybrid SUV in December 2021. It gets a DHE 1.5-litre three-cylinder engine with electrified tech. Combined, the engine produces 245 PS (180 kW; 242 hp) and 540 N⋅m (398 lb⋅ft) of torque and has a claimed range of 1,000 kilometres (621 mi) on a full tank. There's also a three-speed gearbox and it accelerates from 0–100 kilometres per hour (0–62 mph) in 7.9 seconds.

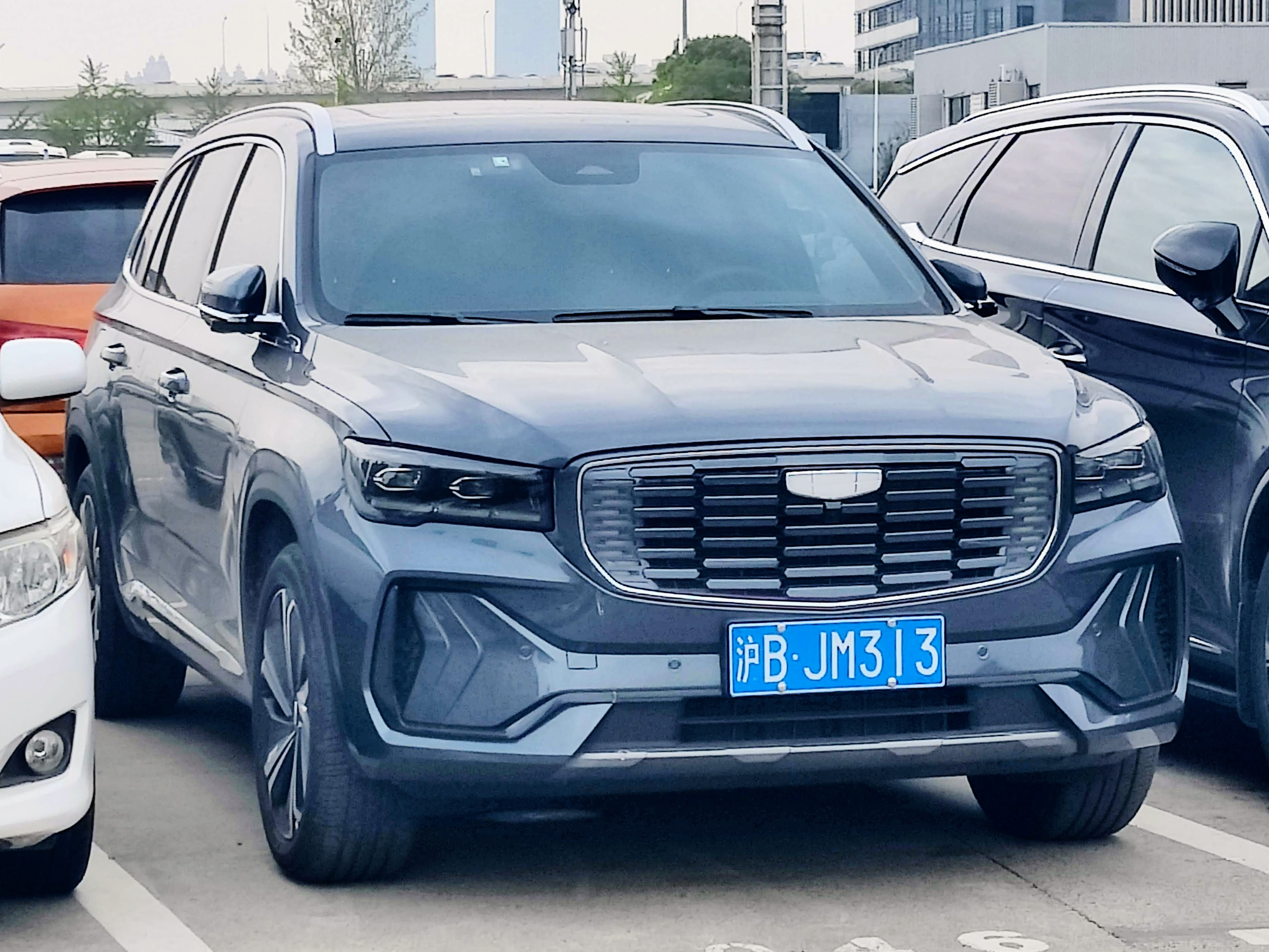
Geely Xingyue L Hi-X

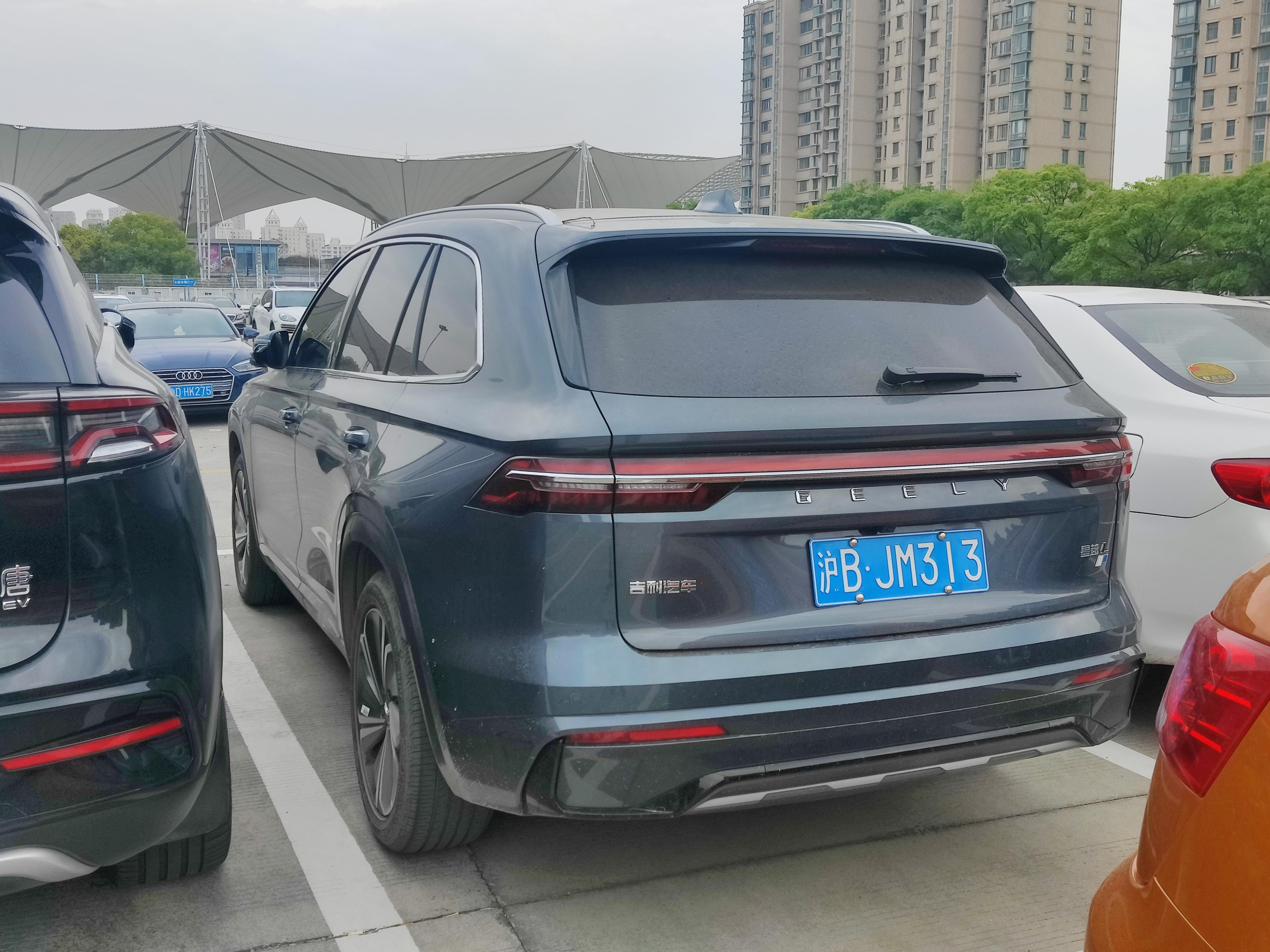
Rear view

==== Xingyue L Hi-P ====
Geely unveiled the Xingyue L Hi-P hybrid SUV in October 2022. The Xingyue L Hi-P is equipped with a DHE 150 kW 1.5-litre turbo engine, along with electric motors. When the 41.2 kWh CTP flat-panel battery is fully charged, it can achieve a pure electric cruising range of 207.5 km (129 mi) under WLTC conditions, resulting in a claimed combined range of 1,250 km (780 mi) on a full tank. The Xingyue L Hi-P also comes standard with DC fast charging, allowing the battery to be charged from 30% to 80% in 27 minutes when utilizing the maximum charging power of 85 kW.

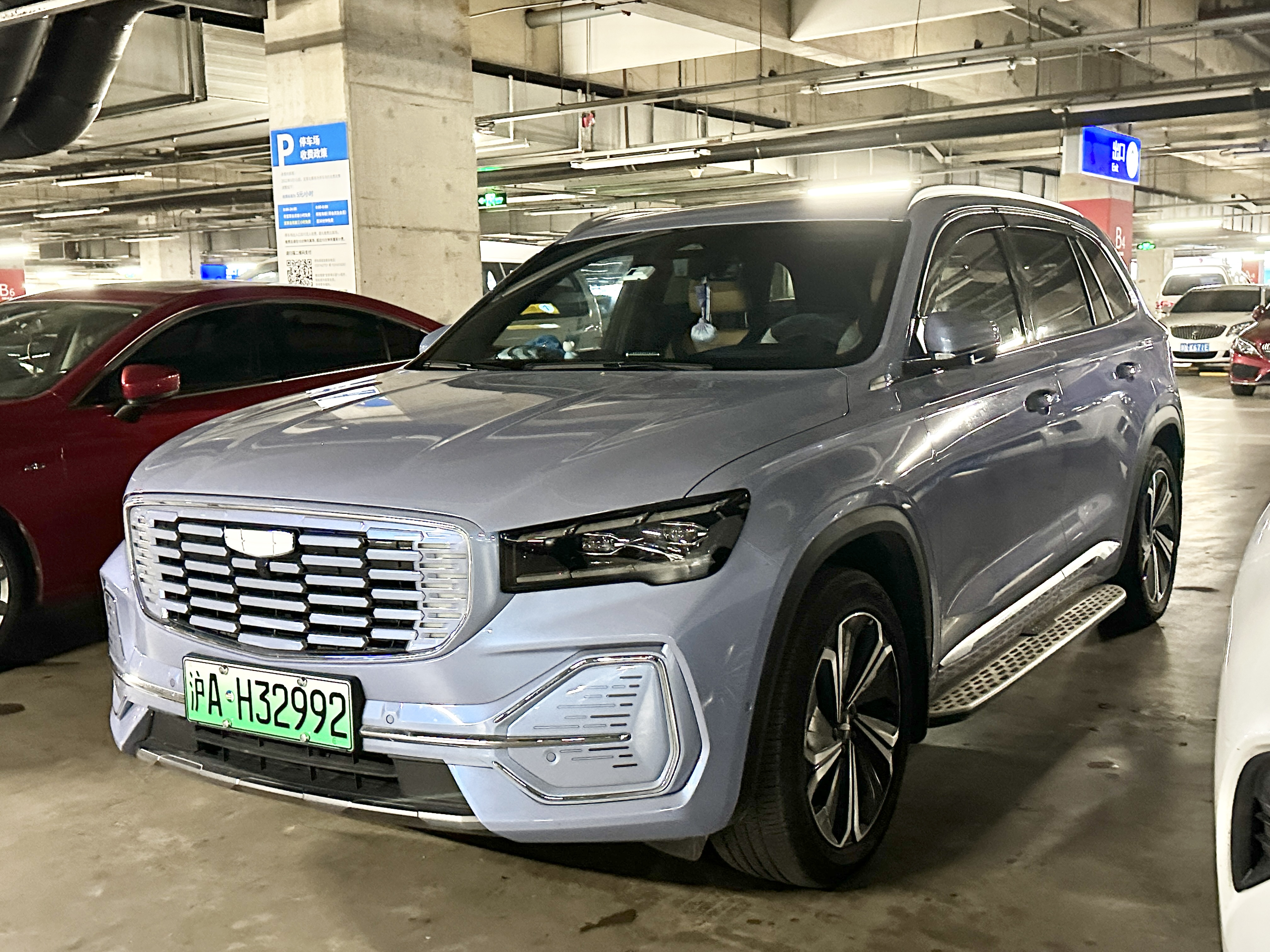
Geely Xingyue L Hi-P

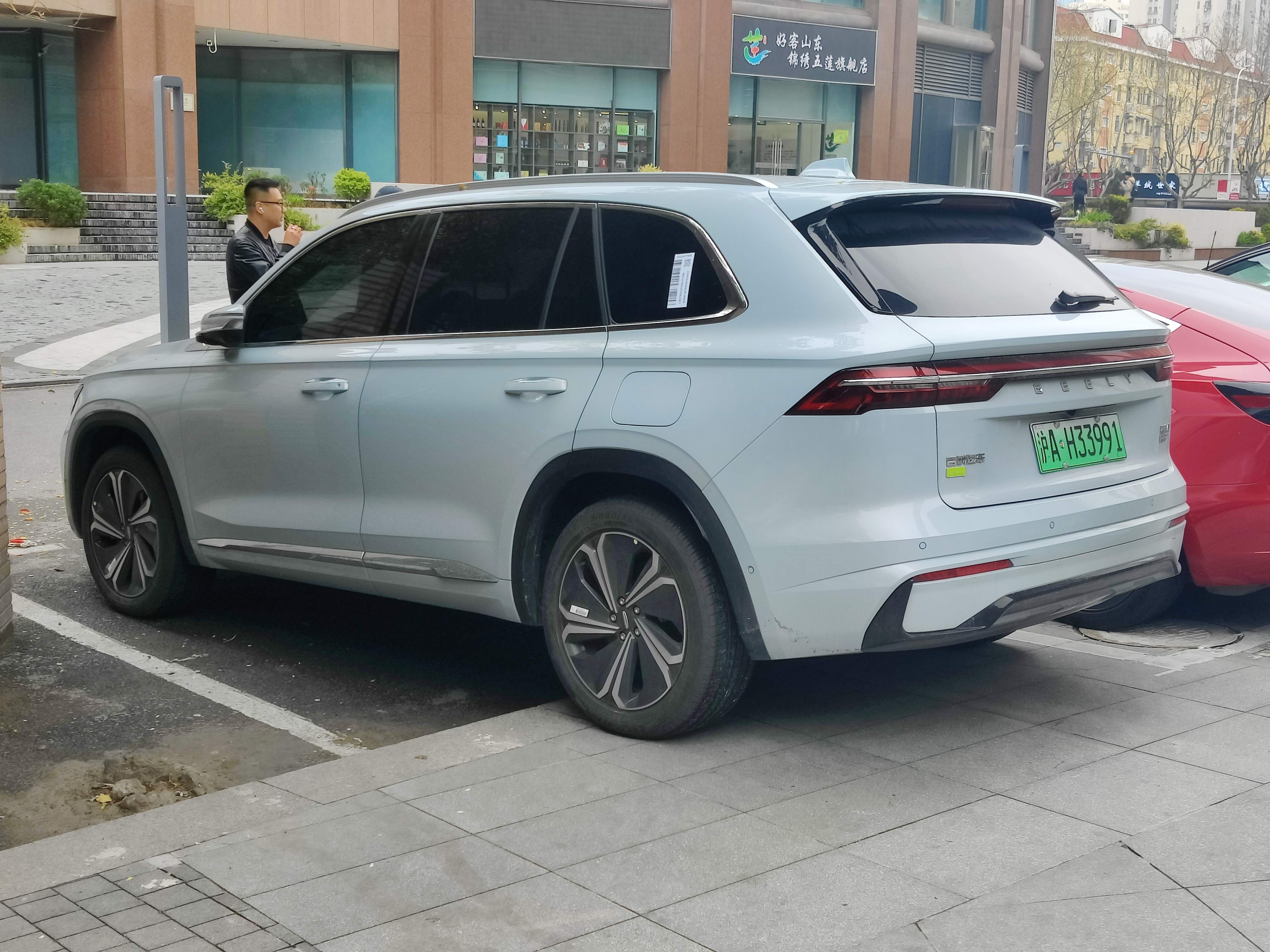
Rear view

==== Xingyue L Zhiqing ====
Geely unveiled the Xingyue L Zhiqing hybrid SUV in December 2023. The Zhiqing (智擎) powertrain is a 1.5-litre BHE inline-four engine with a 3-speed DHT PRO petrol-electric hybrid system with an efficiency of 4.79L/100 km.

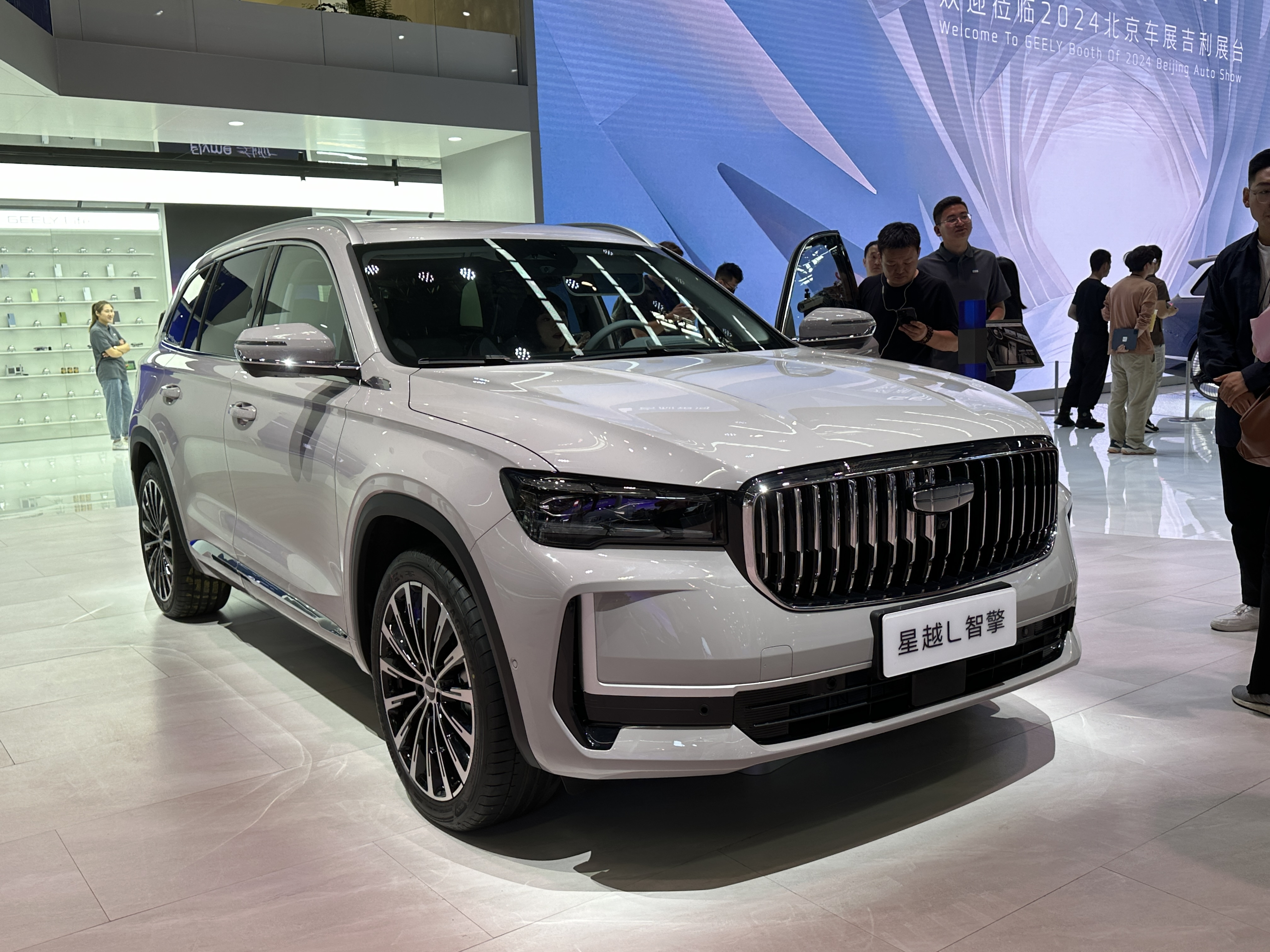
Geely Xingyue L Zhiqing

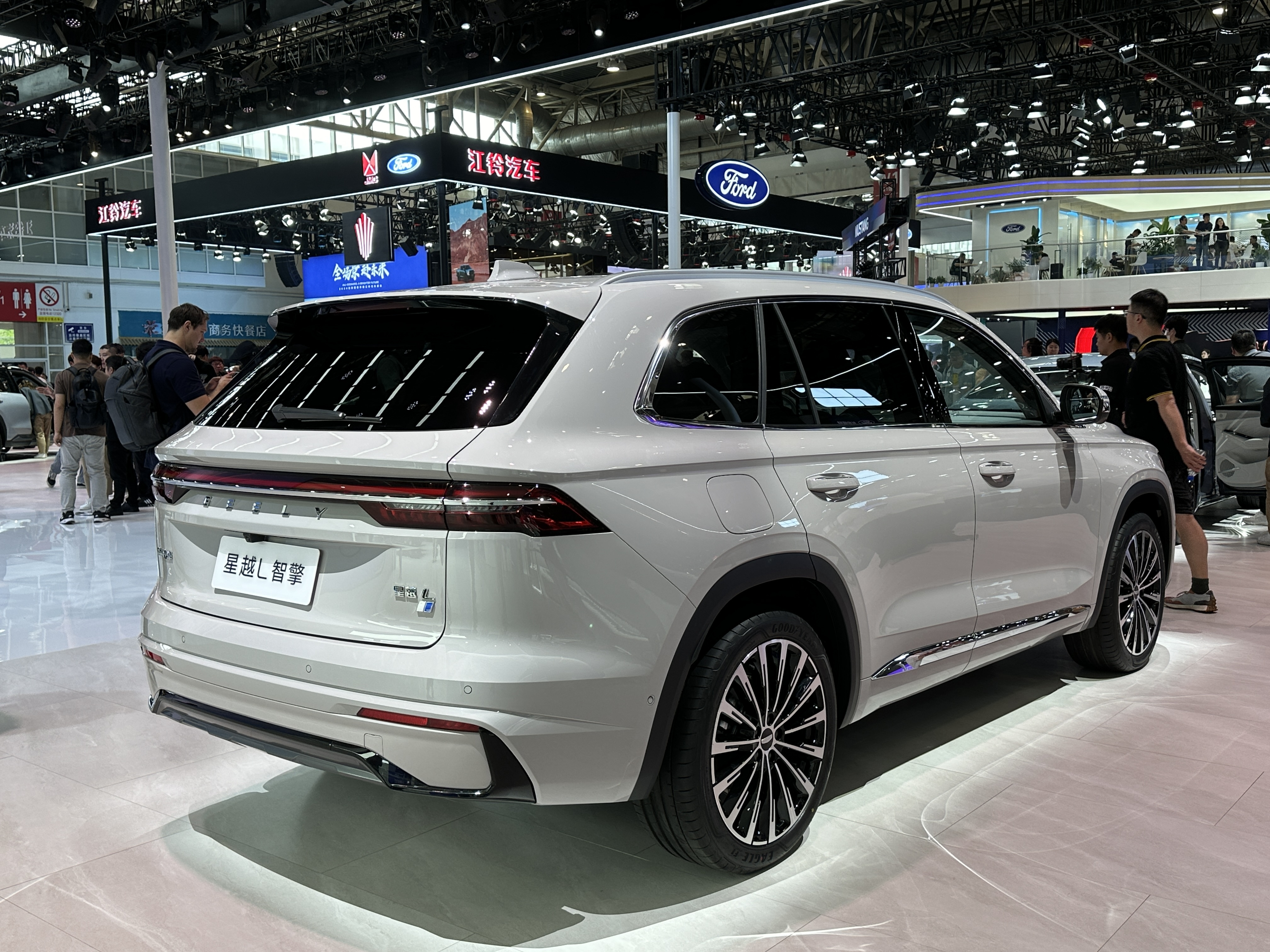
Rear view

=== Renault Grand Koleos ===
The Renault Grand Koleos is a rebadged variant of Xingyue L manufactured by Renault Korea, a joint venture between Geely and Renault.

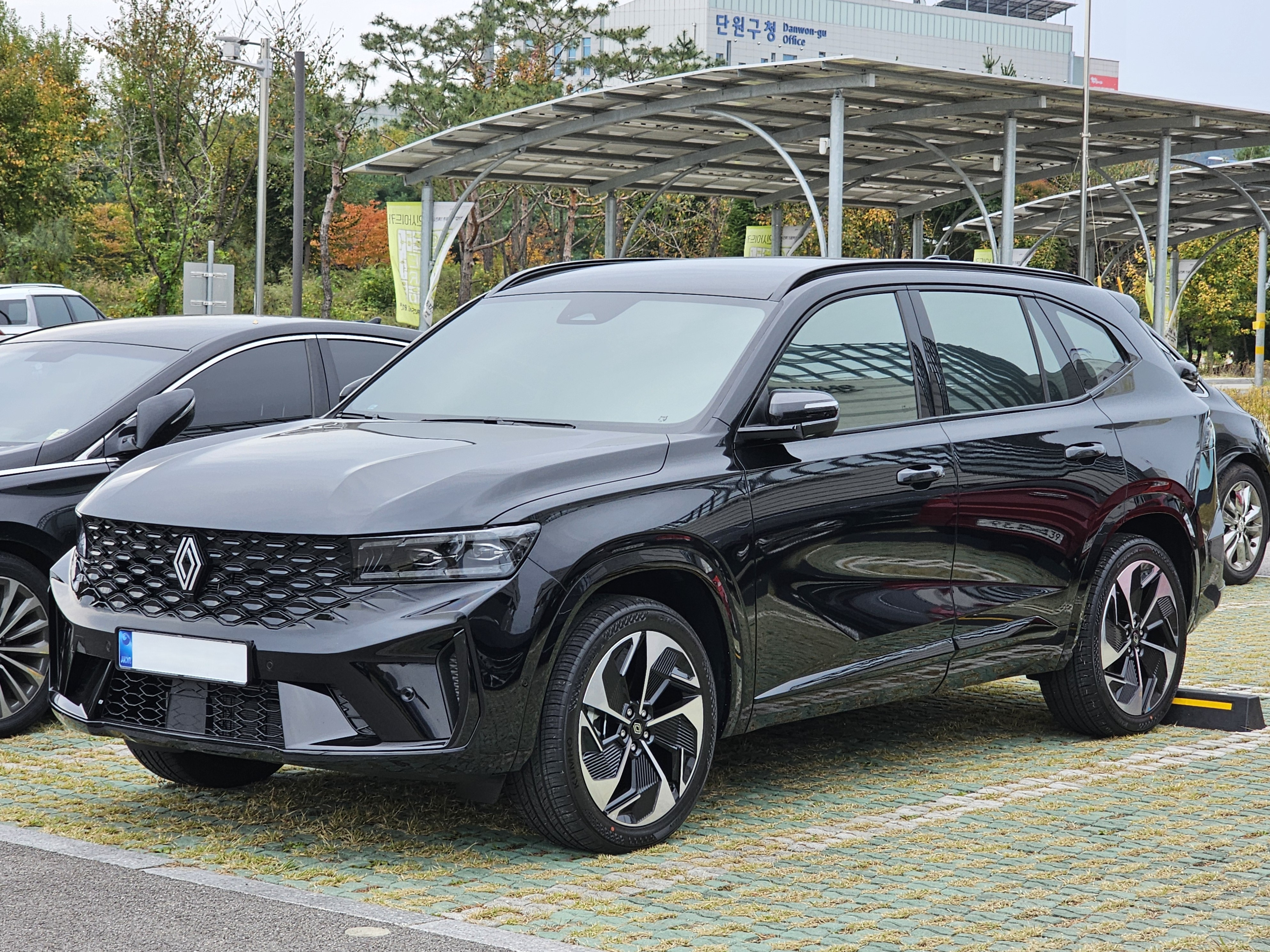
Renault Grand Koleos

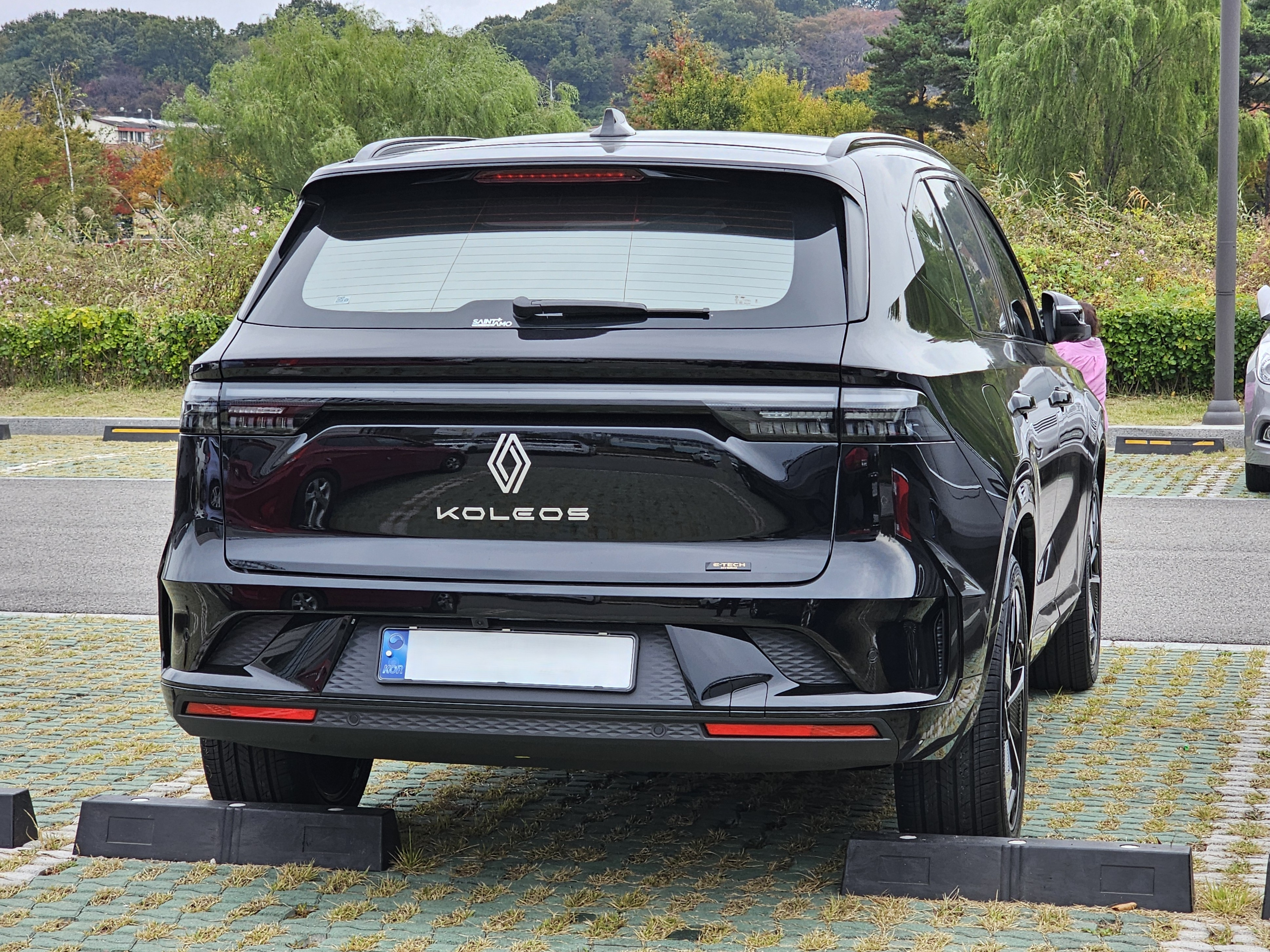
Rear view

=== Export markets ===
==== Vietnam ====
The Monjaro was launched in Vietnam on 16 July 2025, with three variants: HEV, Premium and Flagship. For powertrains, the HEV is powered by the 1.5-litre turbocharged petrol hybrid and front-wheel drive, while the Premium and Flagship variants are powered by the 2.0-litre turbocharged petrol and are equipped with all-wheel drive.

== Second generation (KX21, 2026) ==
Geely Xingyue L Plus

Overview
- Model code: KX21
- Production: 2026 (to commence)
- Assembly: China: Xi'an, Shaanxi

Dimensions
- Wheelbase: 2,900 mm (114.2 in)
- Length: 4,955 mm (195.1 in)
- Width: 1,769 mm (69.6 in)
- Height: 1,960 mm (77.2 in)

In September 5 2026, the second generation of Xingyue L is revealed, marketed as Xingyue L Plus.

== Sales ==
Year	China	Mexico
2021	43,437	—
2022	131,381	—
2023	143,132	—
2024	223,467	—
2025	218,154	777
