= Lynk & Co 02 =

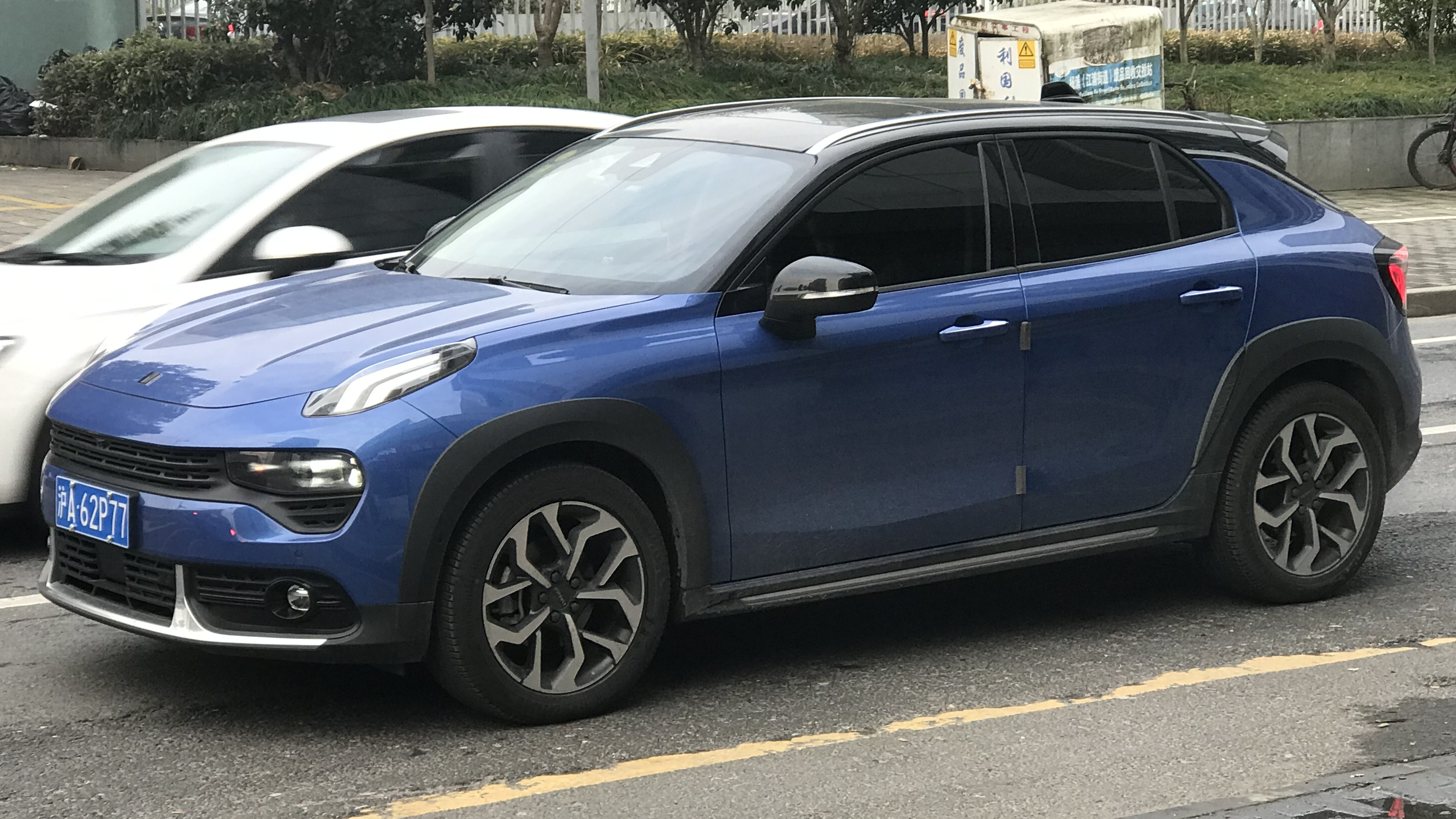
- Lynk & Co 02

Overview
- Manufacturer: Lynk & Co (Geely)
- Production: 2018–present

Body and chassis
- Class: Compact crossover SUV
- Body style: 5-door hatchback
- Layout: Front-engine, front-wheel-drive (first generation); Front-engine, rear-wheel-drive(second generation) all-wheel-drive (second generation)

The Lynk & Co 02 (Chinese: 领克02; pinyin: Lǐng kè 02) is a compact car manufactured by Geely owned Chinese-Swedish automaker Lynk & Co. This is the second vehicle from the brand, developed by China Euro Vehicle Technology AB (CEVT), a Swedish subsidiary to Geely. It was announced in March 2018, and went on sale in June 2018. The second generation Lynk & Co 02 for Europe was launched in 2024, named the Lynk & Co Z20 in China, it will replace the gasoline-powered first generation 02 and become Lynk & Co's first EV in Europe.

== First generation (CC11; 2018) ==
Lynk & Co 02
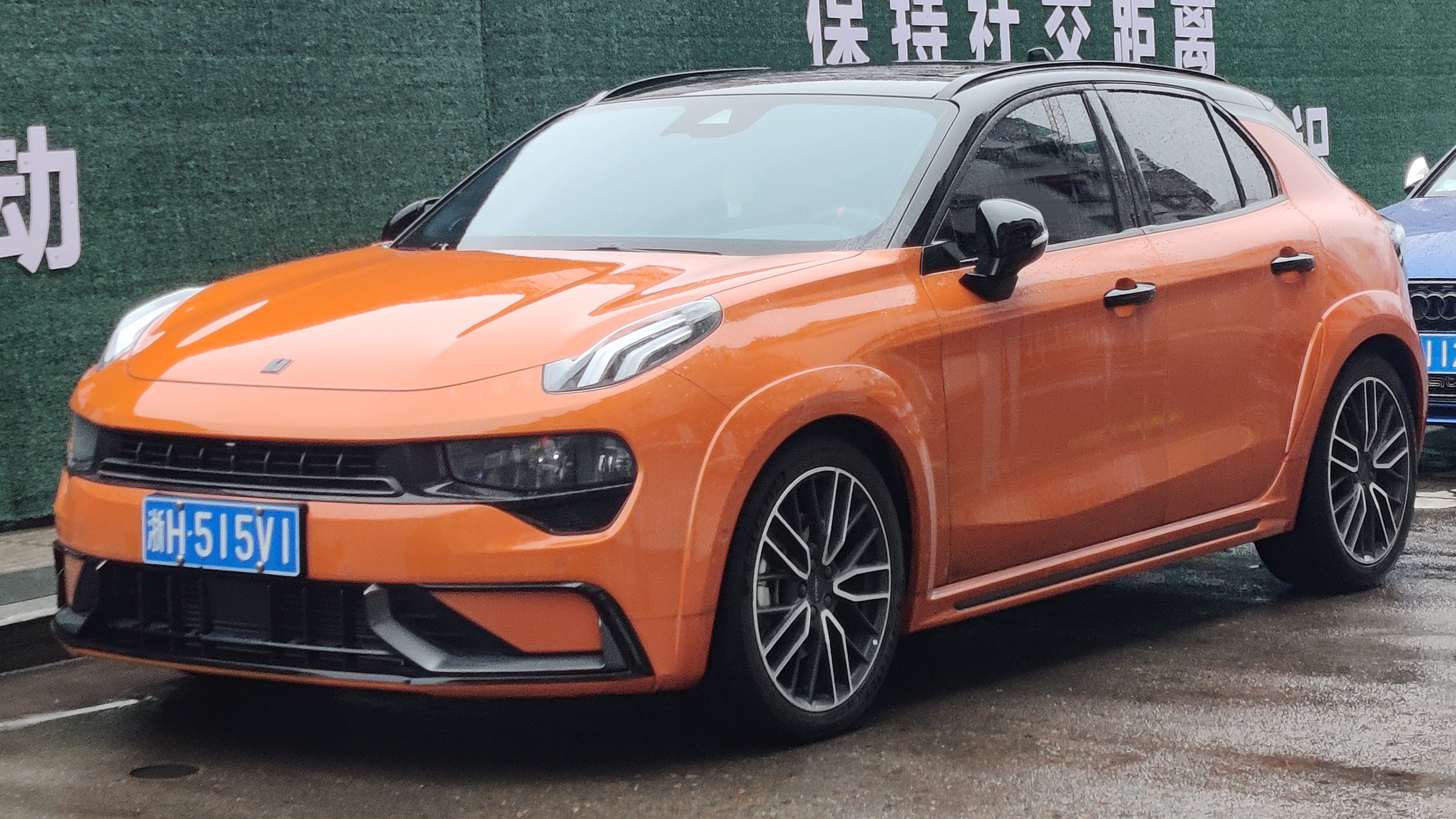
- Hatchback

Overview
- Model code: CC11
- Production: June 2018–2023
- Model years: 2018–2023
- Assembly: China: Zhangjiakou (Lynk & Co Zhangjiakou Plant)
- Designer: Jon Rådbrink, Armand Bentzen

Body and chassis
- Class: Compact car / Compact crossover SUV (C)
- Body style: 5-door hatchback; 5-door SUV
- Layout: Front-engine, front-wheel-drive layout
- Platform: CMA platform
- Related: Volvo XC40; Lynk & Co 01

Powertrain
- Engine: Petrol: 1.5T GB15T2 I3 180hp; 1.5T JLH-3G15TDC I3; 1.5T JLH-3G15TD I3; 2.0T B4204T30/JLH-4G20TD I4
- Transmission: 6-speed manual; 7-speed 7DCT dual-clutch; 8-speed Aisin automatic

Dimensions
- Wheelbase: 2,702 mm (106.4 in)
- Length: 4,448 mm (175.1 in)
- Width: 1,890 mm (74.4 in)
- Height: 1,528 mm (60.2 in)
- Curb weight: 1,426–1,650 kg (3,144–3,638 lb)

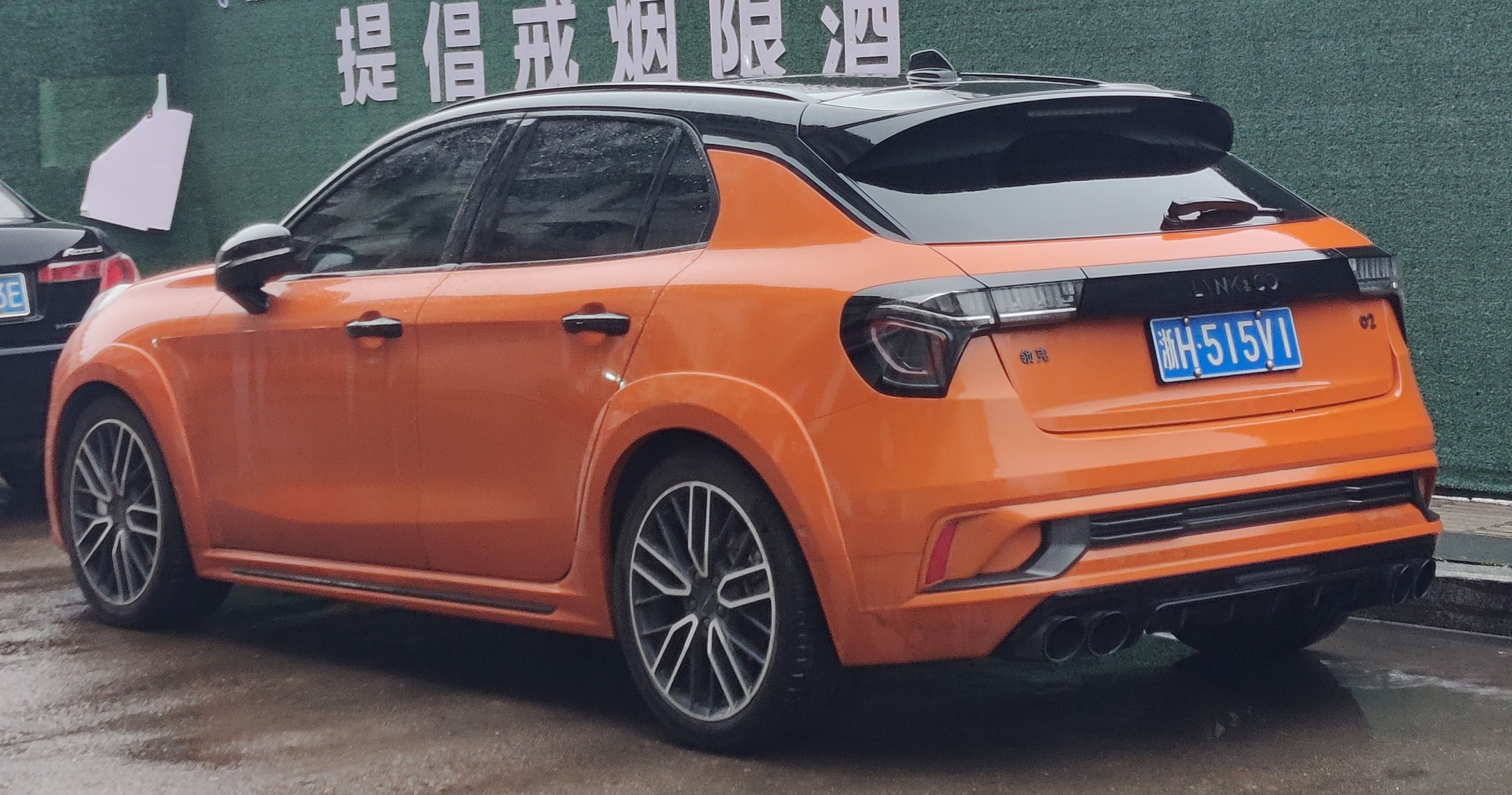
Rear view (hatchback)

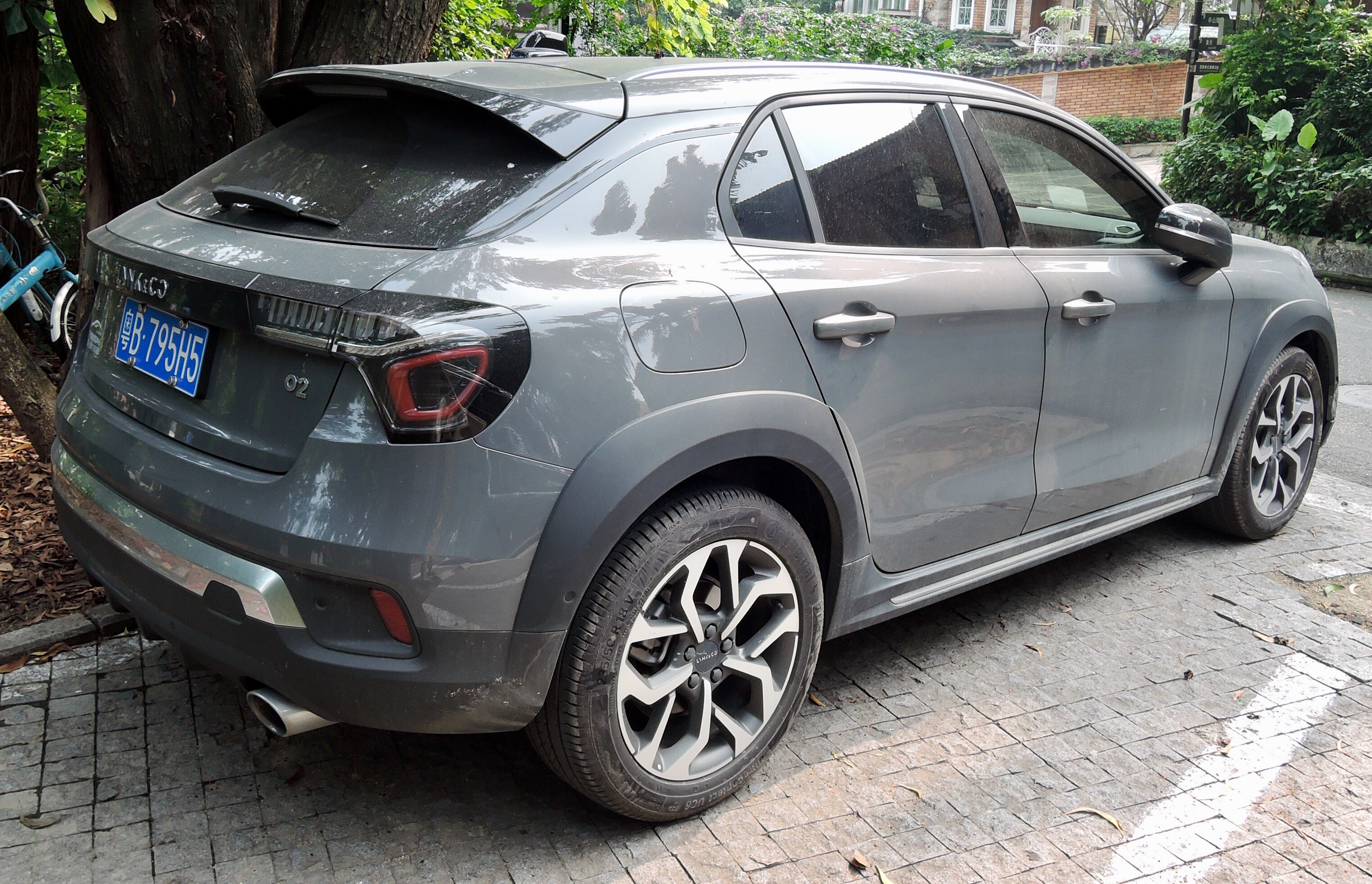
Rear view (SUV)

The 02 first made its appearance in documents as the "CC11", and was later renamed Lynk & Co 02 as the brand developed. It went on sale in June 2018 in China.

Befitting a premium marque, the 02 is equipped with a rich set of features as standard and optional, such as active safety, panoramic cameras, panoramic sunroof, steering headlights, and automatic parking.

In March 2021, the hatchback version of the 02 was revealed.

=== Engines ===
Lynk & Co 02 is available with the following engines:

| Engine code | Power | Torque | Transmission |
|---|---|---|---|
| GB15T2 | 156 PS (115 kW; 154 hp) | 245 N⋅m (181 lb⋅ft) | 6-speed manual |
| JLH-3G15TDC | 156 PS (115 kW; 154 hp) | 245 N⋅m (181 lb⋅ft) | 6-speed manual/7-speed dual clutch |
| JLH-3G15TD | 180 PS (132 kW; 178 hp) | 265 N⋅m (195 lb⋅ft) | 7-speed dual clutch |
| JLH-4G20TD | 190 PS (140 kW; 187 hp) | 300 N⋅m (221 lb⋅ft) | 6-speed automatic/7-speed dual clutch |

== Second generation (E335; 2024) ==
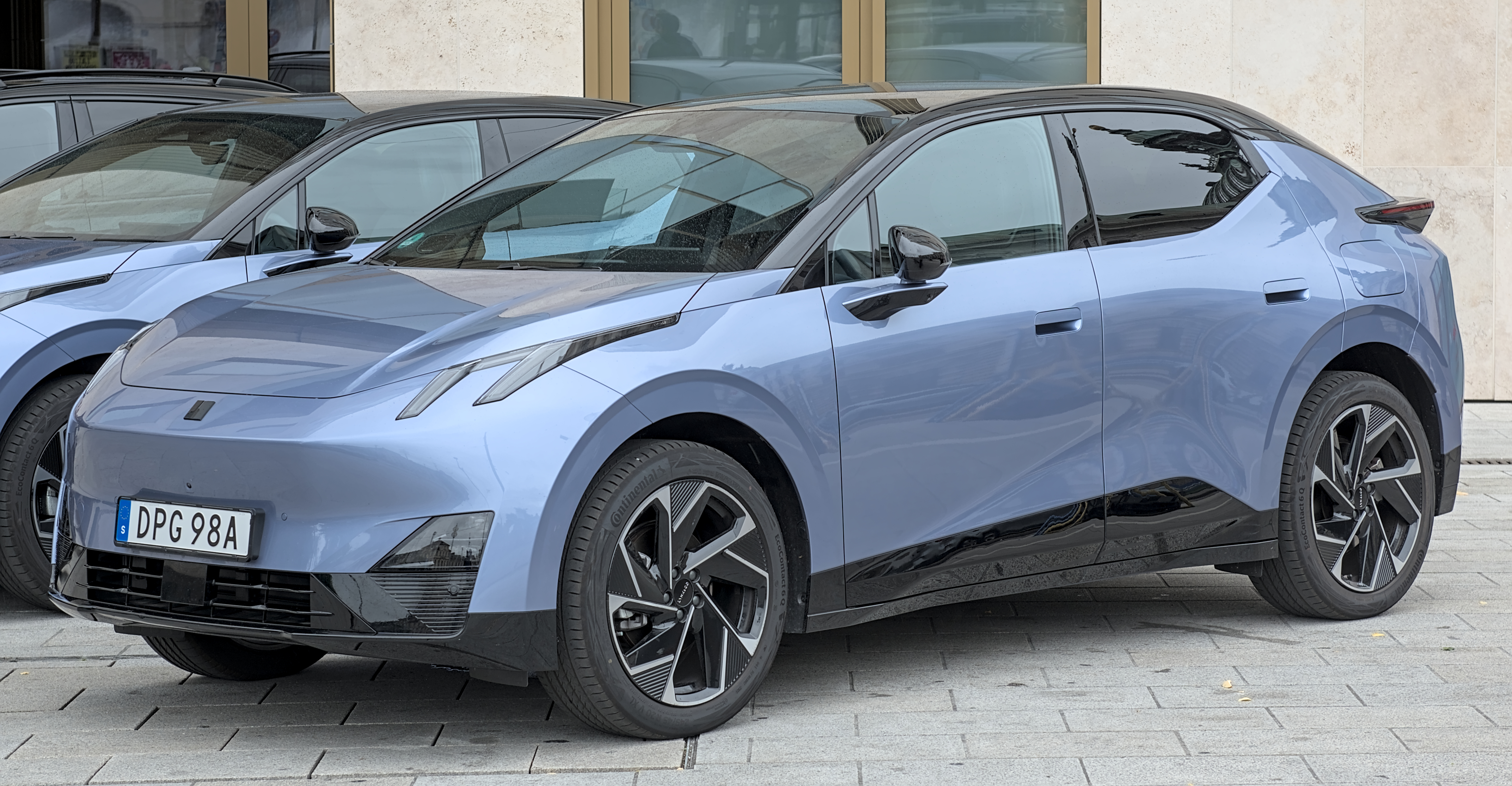
Lynk & Co 02 II (Z20)

The Z20 electric compact crossover SUV is marketed as the Lynk & Co 02 in Europe, where it will be Lynk & Co's first EV.

== Sales ==
Sales of the 02 started in China, in June 2018.

By March 2019, 21,751 units of the 02 had been sold.

| Year | China | |
| Year | 02 | PHEV |
|---|---|---|
| 2020 | 20,870 | 431 |
| 2021 | 13,650 | |
