= Volvo Engine Architecture =

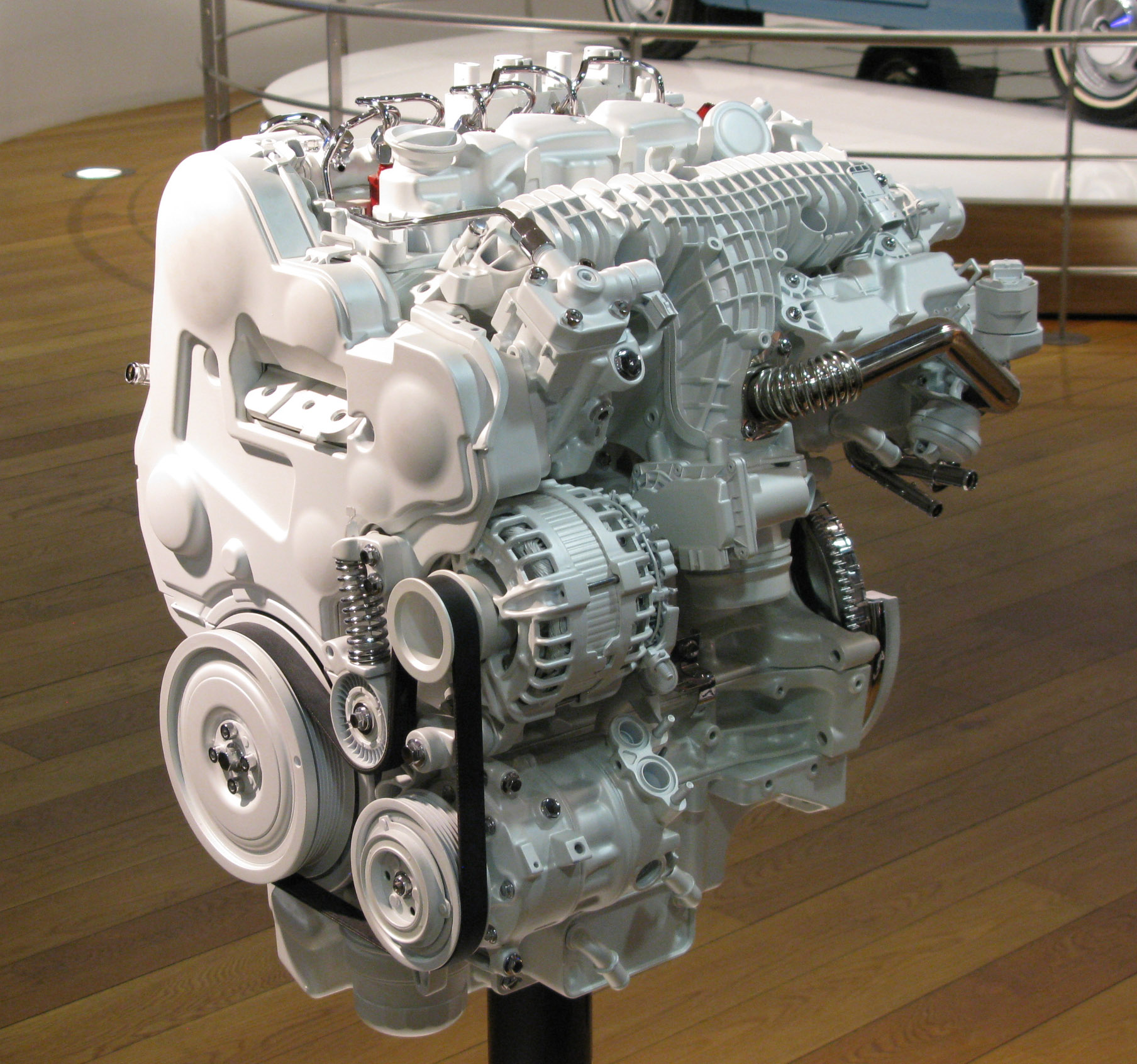

Overview
- Manufacturer: Volvo Cars (Note: Volvo Personvagnar AB Komponentvägen 2; [Volvo Cars AB component factory 2]; and; Zhangjiakou Volvo Engine Manufacturing Co., Ltd.); Geely (Note: Zhejiang Geely Luoyou Engine Co., Ltd.); Aurobay Proton
- Also called: VEP4; VED4; GEP3
- Production: 2013–present

Layout
- Configuration: I3, I4
- Displacement: 1.5 L (1,498 cc); 1.5 L (1,477 cc); 2.0 L (1,969 cc)
- Cylinder bore: 82 mm (3.23 in)
- Piston stroke: 70.9 mm (2.79 in); 93.2 mm (3.67 in)
- Cylinder block material: Aluminum
- Cylinder head material: Aluminum
- Valvetrain: DOHC

RPM range
- Idle speed: 825 rpm – 850 rpm
- Max. engine speed: Petrol: 6000 rpm; Diesel: 5000 rpm

Combustion
- Supercharger: Eaton Roots-type (T6 & T8 engine architecture)
- Turbocharger: Petrol: BorgWarner with intercooler; Diesel: BorgWarner Supplies R2S® Single or Twin turbo-charged (VN Turbo) with PowerPulse
- Fuel system: Petrol: Sequential direct injection; Diesel: Common rail with i-ART
- Management: Denso EMS; Bosch ME
- Fuel type: Petrol; Diesel
- Oil system: Wet sump
- Cooling system: Water-cooled

Emissions
- Emissions target standard: Euro 6; Euro 6b; Euro 6d-TEMP; Euro 6d; SULEV30/PZEV; TZEV; China V (Note: GB18352.5-2013 国V); China VI; China VIB
- Emissions control systems: Petrol: Catalytic converter; Catalytic converter with particle filter; Diesel: EGR with DPF & LNT; EGR with DPF, LNT & SCR; EGR, DPF, LNT, SCR & Ad-Blue

Chronology
- Predecessor: Petrol: Volvo Modular Engine (general replacement); Volvo SI6 Engine (T6 & T8 engine); Diesel: Volvo D5 Engine

The Volvo Engine Architecture (VEA) is a family of straight-three and straight-four automobile petrol and diesel engines produced by Volvo Cars in Skövde, Sweden, since 2013, Zhangjiakou, China, since 2016 and Tanjung Malim, Malaysia, since 2022 by Proton. Volvo markets all engines under the Drive–E designation, while Geely groups the three-cylinder variants with its other engines under the G-power name. These engines are some of the few ever put into production as twincharged engines, in the company of the Lancia Delta S4 and concept Jaguar CX-75.

== History ==
Development of the new engine family began in 2006, with the decision to only produce four-cylinder engines being finalised in 2007. The intention was to produce smaller, more economical and environmentally friendly engines that would be fitted to every Volvo model. In 2008 Volvo began to upgrade its Skövde engine plant and invested roughly 2 billion SEK into development and tooling for the VEA.

In the autumn of 2013, the first cars with the new engines were delivered to customers, starting with the S60 II and V60 models. At the same time, Volvo began to phase out the five-cylinder petrol and diesel engines, the six-cylinder petrol engines as well as any four-cylinder engines from other manufacturers. Until the end of 2015, nearly all other engines had been phased out, with only a few non VEA engines remaining in production for select models. Volvo nearly completed the phaseout in 2016 with only two variants of the five-cylinder diesel remaining in production for the 60-series models.

In December 2014, Volvo introduced the first hybrid variant of a VEA engine with the launch of the XC90 T8. It uses an electric rear axle drive (ERAD) for both electric propulsion and AWD capabilities. Hybrid engines are equipped with a crankshaft integrated starter generator (CISG) that is used to start the engine, capture otherwise lost energy when slowing down and reduce lag at low rpm by acting as an additional supercharger. Volvo refers to this type of hybrid implementation as Twin Engine.

With the introduction of Volvo's new flagship sedan in 2016, the S90, the PowerPulse anti-lag system for the top of the range diesel engines was unveiled. It uses a small tank of compressed air that can instantaneously be released into the turbocharger to help with spool up, thereby reducing turbo lag.

Volvo began testing of three-cylinder variants in mid 2014, it had been planned to introduce these engines in 2015. With their smaller capacity and less power they were meant to be used as base engines. In 2015 no three-cylinder engines were released, instead four-cylinder variants with 1.5 L capacity were introduced as base engines on some models. In the second half of 2017, the first production VEA three-cylinder engine was released with the debut of the LEVC TX, where it is used as a range extender. The first Volvo three-cylinder VEA was slated for introduction in 2018 for the XC40 under the T3 engine designation, however it saw only limited release.

Due to stricter emissions laws, additional and improved emissions control equipment was introduced, beginning in the second half of 2017 for the 2018 model year. Diesel engines gained a SCR-catalyst to decrease NOx emissions, petrol engines received a particle filter. These changes are referred to as VEA GEN2. This improved the emissions rating to Euro 6c and for some engines to Euro 6d-TEMP. The improvements were rolled out in stages and some engines, particularly the hybrid variants, remained in Euro 6 configuration until the second quarter of 2018. By model year 2019 all engines had been updated to achieve Euro 6d-TEMP certification, with some engines getting discontinued. All diesel engines are now equipped with Ad-Blue (Note: DEF) and all petrol engines with a particle filter.

Volvo has been developing a major update for all its engines since 2017. It is code-named VEA GEN3 (with VEP GEN3 and VED GEN3 respectively) and part of Volvo's effort to hybridize all of its engines. The MHEV variants will have a 48V network separate from the high-voltage battery system.

New B badging for hybrid vehicles. Deviating from the previously introduced T<some number> (1994 with the T-5, without the dash in 1996 for X70) and D<some number> (2002 with the D5 engine, expanded in ~2009 with D4 and D3 subdivision) naming/badging scheme. The system uses kinetic energy recovery via a belt driven integrated starter generator (BISG) which is stored in a 48V 0.25 kWh lion battery. Under heavy load or rapid acceleration the BISG is used as a power adder. P0 hybridization.

=== Nomenclature ===
The engine codes consist of a series of letters and digits. The actual, broadly used engine code is 7 or 8 characters long. Hybrid models can have a second engine code that is 7 characters long, mild hybrids engine codes are 6 characters long. Different, more general engine codes are used for some certification and approval documents and are 6 to 8 characters long. An additional 2 characters are used to identify each specific engine variant with an MP or HP suffix to differentiate performance.

Standard engine codes:

- 1st: Fuel type (B/D) B = Bensin (Petrol), D = Diesel
- 2nd: Number of cylinders (3/4)
- 3rd & 4th: Approximate displacement in deciliters, may be rounded up or down (19 ~= 2.0 L)
- 5th: Valves per cylinder (4)
- 6th: Induction method (T) T = turbocharged
- 7th & 8th: Engine variant (4/5/6/9/11/14/20/23/27/35/44)

== Petrol (GEP3/VEP4) ==
=== 1.5 ===
All three-cylinder 1.5 L (1,477 cc) petrol engines have a bore of 82 mm (3.2 in) and a stroke of 93.2 mm (3.7 in) with a compression ratio of 10.5:1. All engines are turbocharged and intercooled with direct injection. All 3 cylinder engines are equipped with belt driven water pump and integrated mass balancer shaft, 4 cylinder engines are equipped with an electric water pump.

==== B3154T ====
The B3154T is usually only referred to as range extender. It delivers 82 PS (60 kW; 81 hp) at 4000 rpm and 255 N⋅m (188 lb⋅ft). When running it only recharges the high voltage battery, thus functioning as a range extender giving approx. 300 miles of additional range. Single turbocharger.

CISG.

Emissions level Euro 6.

Applications:

- 2017–present LEVC TX badged as LEVC TX, LEVC TX e-City or with no additional badging.

==== B3154T ====
The B3154T (11 or 14 for standard transmission and 15 for automatic) delivers 156 PS (115 kW; 154 hp) at 5000 rpm and 265 N⋅m (195 lb⋅ft) of torque in the range of 1850–3850 rpm with standard transmission or 265 N⋅m (195 lb⋅ft) of torque in the range of 1850–3850 rpm with automatic. Engine variant for cars equipped with a manual or automatic gearbox. Single turbocharger.

This engine is only available with a six-gear gearbox made by Volvo Cars or the Toyota AW8G30 gearbox.

It was replaced by the newer engine B3154T7 which retains the same ID code of 11 but not 14; automatic was changed to B3154T2 which retains the same ID code of 15.

Emissions level Euro 6d-TEMP.

Applications:

- 2019 Volvo XC40 badged as XC40 T3

==== B3154T2 ====
The B3154T2 (15) delivers 163 PS (120 kW; 161 hp) at 5500 rpm and 265 N⋅m (195 lb⋅ft) of torque in the range of 1500–3000 rpm. Engine variant for cars equipped with an automatic gearbox. Single turbocharger.

This engine is only available with the AW8G30 gearbox.

Emissions level Euro 6d-TEMP.

Applications:

- 2020–present Volvo XC40 badged as XC40 T3

==== B3154T3 ====
The B3154T3 delivers 129 PS (95 kW; 127 hp) at 5000 rpm and 250 N⋅m (180 lb⋅ft) of torque in the range of 1550–3000 rpm.

Emissions level euro 6dtemp.

Applications:

- 2019–present Volvo XC40 badged as XC40 T2

==== B3154T5 ====
The B3154T5 (BB) delivers 180 PS (132 kW; 178 hp) at 5800 rpm and 265 N⋅m (195 lb⋅ft) of torque in the range of 1500–3000 rpm. The front electric motor (EFAD) delivers 82 PS (60 kW; 81 hp) and 160 N⋅m (120 lb⋅ft) of torque. Single turbocharger.

Battery capacity is 9.7 kWh.

This engine is only available with the 7DCTH gearbox.

Emissions level Euro 6d.

Applications:

- 2020–present Volvo XC40 badged as XC40 T5 Twin Engine

==== B3154T7 ====
The B3154T7 (11) delivers 163 PS (120 kW; 161 hp) at 5500 rpm and 265 N⋅m (195 lb⋅ft) of torque in the range of 1850–3000 rpm. Engine variant for cars equipped with a manual gearbox. Single turbocharger.

This engine is only available with the M76 R6.2 gearbox.

Emissions level Euro 6d-TEMP.

Applications:

- 2020–present Volvo XC40 badged as XC40 T3

==== B3154T9 ====
The B3154T9 delivers 129 PS (95 kW; 127 hp) at 5000 rpm and 245 N⋅m (181 lb⋅ft) of torque in the range of 1600–3000 rpm. Single turbocharger.

Emissions level Euro 6d-TEMP.

Applications:

- 2020–present Volvo XC40 badged as XC40 T2

==== JLH-3G15TD / JLH-3G15T ====
The JLH-3G15TD delivers 180 PS (132 kW; 178 hp) at 5500 rpm and 265 N⋅m (195 lb⋅ft) of torque in the range of 1500–4000 rpm. Single turbocharger.

The JLH-3G15T delivers 150 metric horsepower (110 kW; 148 hp) at 5500 rpm and 226 newton-metres (167 lb⋅ft) of torque in the range of 1500 and 4000 rpm. Single turbocharger.

This engine is only available with a 7-speed DCT.

No emissions standard information.

Applications: JLH-3G15TD

- 2016–present Geely Boyue
- 2018–present Geely Binyue
- 2018–present Geely Borui GE
- 2018–present Lynk & Co 01 / 领克01 badged as 01 PHEV
- 2018–2023 Lynk & Co 02 / 领克02 badged as 02 or 02 1.5TD
- 2018–present Lynk & Co 03 / 领克03 badged as 03 or 03 1.5TD
- 2020–present Geely Icon
- 2020–present Proton X50
- 2020–present Proton X70
- 2023–present Proton X90

Applications: JLH-3G15T

- 2020–present Proton X50
- 2023–present Proton S70
- 2024–present Geely Xingyue L / Renault Grand Koleos

==== JLH-3G15TDC ====
The JLH-3G15TDC delivers 156 PS (115 kW; 154 hp) at 5000 rpm and 245 N⋅m (181 lb⋅ft) of torque in the range of 1450–4000 rpm. Single turbocharger.

Emissions level China V.

Applications:

- 2018–2023 Lynk & Co 02 / 领克02 badged as 02 or 02 1.5TD

==== B4154T2 ====
The B4154T2 (32) delivers 152 PS (112 kW; 150 hp) at 5000 rpm and 250 N⋅m (180 lb⋅ft) of torque in the range of 1800–4000 rpm. Engine variant for cars equipped with an automatic gearbox. Single turbocharger.

This engine is only available with an automatic gearbox.

Emissions level Euro 6d-TEMP.

Applications:

- 2019 Volvo V40 II badged as V40 T3
- 2019 Volvo V40CC badged as V40CC T3

==== B4154T3 ====
The B4154T3 (33) delivers 122 PS (90 kW; 120 hp) at 5000 rpm and 220 N⋅m (160 lb⋅ft) of torque in the range of 1800–3500 rpm. Engine variant for cars equipped with an automatic gearbox. Single turbocharger.

Emissions level Euro 6d-TEMP.

Applications:

- 2019 Volvo V40 II badged as V40 T2

==== B4154T4 ====
The B4154T4 (29) delivers 152 PS (112 kW; 150 hp) at 5000 rpm and 250 N⋅m (180 lb⋅ft) of torque in the range of 1700–4000 rpm. Engine variant for cars equipped with an automatic gearbox. Single turbocharger.

This engine is only available with the AW TF-71SC gearbox.

Emissions level Euro 6b.

Applications:

- 2016–2018 Volvo V40 II badged as V40 T3
- 2015–2018 Volvo V40CC badged as V40CC T3
- 2016–2018 Volvo S60 II badged as S60 T3
- 2016–2018 Volvo S60L badged as S60L T3
- 2016–2018 Volvo V60 badged as V60 T3

==== B4154T5 ====
The B4154T5 (28) delivers 122 PS (90 kW; 120 hp) at 5000 rpm and 220 N⋅m (160 lb⋅ft) of torque in the range of 1600–3500 rpm. Engine variant for cars equipped with an automatic gearbox. Single turbocharger.

This engine is only available with the AW TF-71SC gearbox.

Emissions level Euro 6b, upgraded to Euro 6d-TEMP with model year 2018.

Applications:

- 2016–2019 Volvo V40 II badged as V40 T2
- 2016–2018 Volvo S60 II badged as S60 T2
- 2016–2018 Volvo V60 badged as V60 T2

==== B4154T6 ====
The B4154T6 delivers 152 PS (112 kW; 150 hp) at 5000 rpm and 250 N⋅m (180 lb⋅ft) of torque in the range of 1600–3500 rpm. Single turbocharger.

This engine is only available with the AW TF-71SC gearbox.

Emissions level Euro 6b.

Applications:

- 2016–2019 Volvo V40 II badged as V40 T3
- 2016–2018 Volvo S60 II badged as S60 T3
- 2016–2018 Volvo V60 badged as V60 T3

=== 2.0 ===
All 2.0 L (1,969 cc) petrol engines have a bore of 82 mm (3.2 in) and a stroke of 93.2 mm (3.7 in) with a compression ratio of 10.3:1. All engines are turbocharged and intercooled with direct injection. More powerful versions are equipped with a roots type supercharger in addition to being turbocharged and intercooled. All engines come with an electric water pump and balancer shafts.

==== B4204T5 ====
The B4204T5 delivers 180 PS (132 kW; 178 hp) at 5800 rpm and 265 N⋅m (195 lb⋅ft) of torque in the range of 1500–3000 rpm. The front electric motor (EFAD) delivers 82 PS (60 kW; 81 hp) at 4000 rpm and 160 N⋅m (120 lb⋅ft) of torque at 3500 rpm. Single turbocharger.

Battery capacity is 10.7 kWh.

This engine is only available with the 7DCT gearbox.

Emissions level Euro 6d-TEMP.

Applications:

- 2020–present Volvo XC40 badged as XC40 Twin Engine or XC40 T5 Twin Engine

==== JLH-4G20TD ====
The JLH-4G20TD delivers 190 PS (140 kW; 187 hp) at 4700 rpm and 300 N⋅m (220 lb⋅ft) of torque in the range of 1400–4000 rpm. Single turbocharger.

Emissions level China VI.

Applications:

- 2018–2023 Lynk & Co 02 / 领克02 badged as 02 or 02 2.0T or 02 AWD

==== JLH-4G20TDB ====
The JLH-4G20TDB delivers 238 PS (175 kW; 235 hp) and 350 N⋅m (260 lb⋅ft) of torque.

Emissions level China VIB.

Applications:

- 2020–present Geely Xingyue / Geely Xing Yue / 吉利星越 badged as 驭星者AWD or 星越 350T

==== JLH-4G20TDC ====
The JLH-4G20TDC delivers 254 PS (187 kW; 251 hp) and 350 N⋅m (260 lb⋅ft) of torque in the range of 1800–4800 rpm.

==== JLH-4G20TDH ====
The JLH-4G20TDH delivers 265 PS (195 kW; 261 hp) and 380 N⋅m (280 lb⋅ft) of torque in the range of 2000–4000 rpm.

==== B4204T9 ====
The B4204T9 (49) delivers 302 PS (222 kW; 298 hp) at 5700 rpm and 400 N⋅m (300 lb⋅ft) of torque in the range of 2100–4500 rpm. For 2016 minor changes increased power output to 306 PS (225 kW; 302 hp) at 5700 rpm. Turbocharger and supercharger.

This engine is only available with the AW TG-81SC gearbox.

Emissions level Euro 6, beginning with model year 2018 emissions level Euro 6b.

Applications:

- 2015–2018 Volvo S60 II badged as S60 T6 or S60 T6 AWD
- 2015–2018 Volvo V60 badged as V60 T6 or V60 T6 AWD
- 2014–2017 Volvo XC60 badged as XC60 T6 or XC60 T6 AWD

==== B4204T10 ====
The B4204T10 (27) delivers 302 PS (222 kW; 298 hp) at 5700 rpm and 400 N⋅m (300 lb⋅ft) of torque in the range of 2100–4500 rpm. Turbocharger and supercharger.

This engine is only available with the AW TG-81SC gearbox.

Emissions level Euro 6b.

Applications:

- 2014–2018 Volvo S60 II badged as S60 T6
- 2014–2017 Volvo XC60 badged as XC60 T6

==== B4204T11 ====
The B4204T11 (40) delivers 245 PS (180 kW; 242 hp) at 5500 rpm and 350 N⋅m (260 lb⋅ft) of torque in the range of 1500–4800 rpm. The compression ratio was changed to 10.8:1. Single turbocharger. The crankshaft has a stroke of 93.2mm.

This engine is only available with the AW TG-81SC gearbox.

A specially designed ULEV2 emissions variant of this engine exists.

Emissions level Euro 6.

Applications:

- 2015–2019 Volvo V40 II badged as V40 T5
- 2015–2019 Volvo V40CC badged as V40CC T5 or V40CC T5 AWD
- 2015–2018 Volvo S60 II badged as S60 T5
- 2015–2018 Volvo S60L badged as S60L T5 or S60L T5 AWD
- 2015–2018 Volvo S60CC badged as S60CC T5 AWD
- 2015–2018 Volvo V60 badged as V60 T5
- 2015–2018 Volvo V60CC badged as V60CC T5 or V60CC T5 AWD
- 2015–2017 Volvo XC60 badged as XC60 T5 or XC60 T5 AWD
- 2014–2016 Volvo S80 II badged as S80 T5
- 2014–2016 Volvo V70 III badged as V70 T5 or V70 Bi-Fuel
- 2014–2016 Volvo XC70 II badged as XC70 T5

==== B4204T12 ====
The B4204T12 (26) delivers 240 PS (177 kW; 237 hp) at 5600 rpm and 350 N⋅m (260 lb⋅ft) of torque in the range of 1500–4500 rpm. Single turbocharger.

This engine is a PZEV emissions variant and features additional emissions reducing equipment.

Applications:

- 2015-2016 Volvo S80 II badged as S80 T5
- 2015–2018 Volvo S60 II badged as S60 T5
- 2015–2017 Volvo XC60 badged as XC60 T5

==== B4204T14 ====
The B4204T14 (13) delivers 247 PS (182 kW; 244 hp) at 5500 rpm and 350 N⋅m (260 lb⋅ft) of torque in the range of 1800–4800 rpm. The compression ratio was changed to 10.8:1. Single turbocharger.

The engine is equipped with a particle filter. Emissions level Euro 6d-TEMP.

Applications:

- 2018–present Volvo XC40 badged as XC40 T5 AWD

==== B4204T15 ====
The B4204T15 delivers 220 PS (162 kW; 217 hp) at 5500 rpm and 350 N⋅m (260 lb⋅ft) of torque in the range of 1500–4000 rpm. The compression ration was changed to 10.8:1. Single turbocharger.

This engine is only available with the AW TG-81SC gearbox.

Emissions level Euro 6.

Applications:

- 2014–2016 Volvo V40 II badged as V40 T5
- 2015–2016 Volvo V40CC badged as V40CC T5
- 2016–2017 Volvo S60 II badged as S60 T5
- 2016–2017 Volvo V60 badged as V60 T5
- 2014–2016 Volvo S80 II badged as S80 T5

==== B4204T17 ====
The B4204T17 (36) delivers 122 PS (90 kW; 120 hp) at 5000 rpm and 220 N⋅m (160 lb⋅ft) of torque in the range of 1200–3500 rpm. The compression ratio was changed to 11.3:1. Single turbocharger.

This engine is only available with the M76 R6.2 gearbox.

Emissions level Euro 6d-TEMP.

Applications:

- 2018–2019 Volvo V40 II badged as V40 T2

==== B4204T18 ====
The B4204T18 (16) delivers 252 PS (185 kW; 249 hp) at 5500 rpm and 350 N⋅m (260 lb⋅ft) of torque in the range of 1500–4800 rpm. Single turbocharger.
Nominal rated power is 280 PS (206 kW; 276 hp) at 5500 rpm.

Gearbox only TG-80SC AWD

Emissions level Euro 6d-TEMP.

Applications:

- 2018–present Volvo XC40 badged as XC40 T5 AWD
- 2021–present Lynk & Co 09 Mild hybrid 2.0T+8AT 48V mechanical four-wheel drive
- 2021–present Lynk & Co 09 Hybrid 2.0T HEV light hybrid electric four-wheel drive

==== B4204T19 ====
The B4204T19 (41) delivers 190 PS (140 kW; 187 hp) at 4700 rpm and 300 N⋅m (220 lb⋅ft) of torque in the range of 1350–4000 rpm. The compression ratio was changed to 11.3:1. Single turbocharger.

This engine is available with the M66H, M76, AW TF81-SC and AW TF-71SC gearbox.

Emissions level Euro 6, beginning with model year 2018 emissions level Euro 6b.

Applications:

- 2016–2019 Volvo V40 II badged as V40 T4
- 2016–2019 Volvo V40CC badged as V40CC T4
- 2016–2018 Volvo S60 II badged as S60 T4
- 2016–2018 Volvo S60L badged as S60L T4
- 2016–2018 Volvo V60 badged as V60 T4
- 2015–2016 Volvo V70 III badged as V70 T4

==== B4204T20 ====
The B4204T20 (8) delivers 249 PS (183 kW; 246 hp) at 5500 rpm and 350 N⋅m (260 lb⋅ft) of torque in the range of 1500–4500 rpm. Single turbocharger.

Emissions level Euro 6, for the XC60 II emissions level Euro 6b.

Applications:

- 2017–present Volvo XC60 II badged as XC60 T5 AWD
- 2016–present Volvo S90 II badged as S90 T5
- 2017–present Volvo V90CC badged as V90CC T5 AWD
- 2016–present Volvo XC90 II badged as XC90 T5 AWD
- 2019–present Volvo S60 III badged as S60 T5 AWD

==== B4204T21 ====
The B4204T21 (57) delivers 190 PS (140 kW; 187 hp) at 5000 rpm and 320 N⋅m (240 lb⋅ft) of torque in the range of 1500–4000 rpm. Single turbocharger.

This engine is only available with the AW TG-81SC gearbox.

Emissions level Euro 6.

Applications:

- 2015–2019 Volvo V40CC badged as V40CC T4 AWD

==== B4204T23 ====
The B4204T23 (10) delivers 254 PS (187 kW; 251 hp) at 5500 rpm and 350 N⋅m (260 lb⋅ft) of torque in the range of 1500–4800 rpm. Single turbocharger.

In Europe emissions level Euro 6, for the XC60 II emissions level Euro 6b.
In China emissions level China VI.

Applications:

- 2019–2024 Volvo S60 III badged as S60 T5 AWD
- 2019–present Volvo V60CC badged as V60CC T5 or V60CC T5 AWD
- 2017–present Volvo XC60 II badged as XC60 T5 AWD
- 2016–present Volvo S90 II badged as S90 T5
- 2016–present Volvo S90L badged as S90长轴距 (Note: Chinese for 'Long Wheelbase') T5 (Note: Referred to as S90 China Version T5 by Volvo or informally as S90L T5)
- 2017–2025 Volvo V90 II badged as V90 T5 or V90 Bi-Fuel
- 2017–present Volvo V90CC badged as V90CC T5 AWD
- 2015–present Volvo XC90 II badged as XC90 T5 AWD
- 2019–present Lynk & Co 03 / 领克03 badged as 03+

==== B4204T26 ====
The B4204T26 (25) delivers 250 PS (184 kW; 247 hp) at 5500 rpm and 350 N⋅m (260 lb⋅ft) of torque in the range of 1800–4800 rpm. The compression ratio was changed to 10.8:1. Single turbocharger.

This engine is only available with the AW TG-81SC gearbox.

Emissions level Euro 6, during model year 2018 upgraded to emissions level Euro 6d-TEMP.

Applications:

- 2019–2024 Volvo S60 III badged as S60 T5 or S60 T5 AWD
- 2019–present Volvo V60 II badged as V60 T5 or V60 T5 AWD
- 2018–present Volvo XC60 II badged as XC60 T5 or XC60 T5 AWD
- 2018–present Volvo S90 II badged as S90 T5
- 2018–2025 Volvo V90 II badged as V90 T5
- 2018–2025 Volvo V90CC badged as V90CC T5 AWD
- 2018–present Volvo XC90 II badged as XC90 T5 AWD

==== B4204T27 ====
The B4204T27 (A2) delivers 320 PS (235 kW; 316 hp) at 5700 rpm and 400 N⋅m (300 lb⋅ft) of torque in the range of 2200–5400 rpm. Turbocharger and supercharger.

Emissions level Euro 6, upgraded to Euro 6b for model year 2017, beginning with model year 2018 emissions level Euro 6d-TEMP.

Applications:

- 2019–2021 Volvo S60 III badged as S60 T6 AWD
- 2019–2021 Volvo V60 II badged as V60 T6 AWD
- 2017–2020 Volvo XC60 II badged as XC60 T6 AWD
- 2017–2021 Volvo S90 II badged as S90 T6 AWD
- 2017–2021 Volvo V90 II badged as V90 T6 AWD
- 2017–2021 Volvo V90CC badged as V90CC T6 AWD
- 2016–2022 Volvo XC90 II badged as XC90 T6 AWD

==== B4204T28 ====
The B4204T28 (BC), later B4204T28 (B1FPHEV) (BR), delivers 318 PS (234 kW; 314 hp) at 5700 rpm and 400 N⋅m (300 lb⋅ft) of torque in the range of 2200–5400 rpm. The rear electric motor (ERAD) delivers 87 PS (64 kW; 86 hp) and 240 N⋅m (180 lb⋅ft) of torque. Turbocharger and supercharger.

Battery capacity was 9.2 kWh for model years 2016 and 2017. It was increased to 10.4 kWh beginning with model year 2018.

This engine is only available with the AW TG-81SC gearbox.

Emissions level Euro 6b, from model year 2018 emissions level Euro 6d-TEMP.

Applications:

- 2018–present Volvo XC60 II badged as XC60 T8, XC60 T8 AWD, XC60 Twin Engine or XC60 T8 TWIN ENGINE AWD
- 2018–present Volvo S90 II badged as S90 T8, S90 T8 AWD, S90 Twin Engine or S90 T8 TWIN ENGINE AWD
- 2019–2025 Volvo V90 II badged as V90 T8, V90 T8 AWD, V90 Twin Engine or V90 T8 TWIN ENGINE AWD
- 2016–present Volvo XC90 II badged as XC90 T8, XC90 T8 AWD, XC90 Twin Engine or XC90 T8 TWIN ENGINE AWD

==== B4204T29 ====
The B4204T29 (A3) delivers 310 PS (228 kW; 306 hp) at 5700 rpm and 400 N⋅m (300 lb⋅ft) of torque in the range of 2200–5400 rpm. Turbocharger and supercharger.

In the S60 III and V60 II, and for all other models from and including model year 2020, it delivers 310 PS (228 kW; 306 hp) at 5700 rpm and 400 N⋅m (300 lb⋅ft) of torque in the range of 2200–5100 rpm. Turbocharger and supercharger.

This engine is only available with the AW TG-81SC gearbox.

Emissions level Euro 6, from model year 2019 on emissions level Euro 6d-TEMP.

Applications:

- 2019–present Volvo V60 II badged as V60 T6 AWD
- 2018–2020 Volvo XC60 II badged as XC60 T6 AWD
- 2018–present Volvo S90 II badged as S90 T6 AWD
- 2018–2025 Volvo V90 II badged as V90 T6 AWD
- 2018–2025 Volvo V90CC badged as V90CC T6 AWD
- 2018–present Volvo XC90 II badged as XC90 T6 AWD

==== B4204T30 ====
The B4204T30 delivers 190 PS (140 kW; 187 hp) at 4700 rpm and 300 N⋅m (220 lb⋅ft) of torque in the range of 1400–4000 rpm. Single turbocharger.

This engine is available with a 7-speed DCT.

Emissions level China VI.

Applications:

- 2017–present Lynk & Co 01 / 领克01 badged as 01 AWD
- 2018–2023 Lynk & Co 02 / 领克02 badged as 02, 02 2.0T or 02 AWD.

==== B4204T31 ====
The B4204T31 (AK) delivers 190 PS (140 kW; 187 hp) at 5000 rpm and 300 N⋅m (220 lb⋅ft) of torque in the range of 1600–4000 rpm. The compression ratio was changed to 11.8:1. Single turbocharger.

This engine is only available with the AW TG-81SC gearbox.

Emissions level Euro 6, beginning with model year 2018 emissions level Euro 6d-TEMP.

Applications:

- 2018–present Volvo S90 II badged as S90 T4
- 2018–2025 Volvo V90 II badged as V90 T4

==== B4204T32 ====
The B4204T32 delivers 238 PS (175 kW; 235 hp) at 5700 rpm and 350 N⋅m (260 lb⋅ft) of torque in the range of 1500–4500 rpm. The rear electric motor (ERAD) delivers 68 PS (50 kW; 67 hp) and 200 N⋅m (150 lb⋅ft) of torque. Turbocharger and supercharger.

Battery capacity is 11.2 kWh.

This engine is only available with the AW TG-81SC gearbox.

Emissions level China V.

Applications:

- 2016–2019 Volvo S60L badged as S60L T6 Twin Engine

==== B4204T33 ====
The B4204T33 (35) delivers 152 PS (112 kW; 150 hp) at 5000 rpm and 250 N⋅m (180 lb⋅ft) of torque in the range of 1300–4000 rpm. Single turbocharger.

This engine is only available with the M76 manual transmission.

Emissions level Euro 6d-TEMP.

Applications:

- 2019 Volvo V40 II badged as V40 T3

==== B4204T34 ====
The B4204T34 (BM) delivers 320 PS (235 kW; 316 hp) at 5700 rpm and 400 N⋅m (300 lb⋅ft) of torque in the range of 2200–5400 rpm. The rear electric motor (ERAD) delivers 87 PS (64 kW; 86 hp) and 240 N⋅m (180 lb⋅ft) of torque. Turbocharger and supercharger.

In the newly released S60 III and V60 II, and for all other models from and including model year 2020, it delivers 303 PS (223 kW; 299 hp) at 6000 rpm and 400 N⋅m (300 lb⋅ft) of torque in the range of 2200–4800 rpm. The rear electric motor (ERAD) delivers 87 PS (64 kW; 86 hp) and 240 N⋅m (180 lb⋅ft) of torque. Turbocharger and supercharger.

Battery capacity was 10.4 kWh for model years 2018 and 2019. It was increased to 11.6 kWh for model year 2020.

This engine is only available with the AW TG-81SD gearbox.

Emissions level Euro 6d-TEMP.

Applications:

- 2019–2024 Volvo S60 III badged as S60 T8 Twin Engine
- 2019–present Volvo V60 II badged as V60 T8 Twin Engine, V60 T8 Twin Engine AWD or V60 T8 Twin Engine eAWD
- 2018–present Volvo XC60 II badged as XC60 T8, XC60 T8 TWIN ENGINE eAWD or XC60 T8 AWD RECHARGE
- 2018–present Volvo S90 II badged as S90L T8, S90 Excellence or S90L Excellence
- 2018–present Volvo XC90 II badged as XC90 T8 or XC90 T8 TWIN ENGINE

==== B4204T35 ====
The B4204T35 (B1APHEV) (BA) delivers 320 PS (235 kW; 316 hp) at 5700 rpm and 400 N⋅m (300 lb⋅ft) of torque in the range of 2200–5400 rpm. The rear electric motor (ERAD) delivers 87 PS (64 kW; 86 hp) and 240 N⋅m (180 lb⋅ft) of torque. Turbocharger and supercharger.

This engine is only available with the AW TG-81SC gearbox.

In Europe emissions level Euro 6, upgraded to emissions level Euro 6b, from model year 2018 on Euro 6d-TEMP.
In China emissions level China V, upgraded to China VI.

Applications:

- 2020–present Volvo V60 II badged as V60 T8, T8 AWD, T8 Twin Engine AWD, T8 Polestar Engineered
- 2018–present Volvo XC60 II badged as XC60 T8, XC60 T8 AWD, XC60 Twin Engine or XC60 T8 TWIN ENGINE AWD
- 2018–present Volvo S90 II badged as S90 T8, S90 T8 AWD, S90 Twin Engine or S90 T8 TWIN ENGINE AWD or S90 RECHARGE T8
- 2018–2025 Volvo V90 II badged as V90 T8, V90 T8 AWD, V90 Twin Engine or V90 T8 TWIN ENGINE AWD
- 2016–present Volvo XC90 II badged as XC90 T8, XC90 T8 AWD, XC90 Twin Engine or XC90 T8 TWIN ENGINE AWD
- 2021–present Lynk & Co 09 PHEV 2.0T+8AT PHEV electric four-wheel drive

==== B4204T36 ====
The B4204T36 (3) delivers 249 PS (183 kW; 246 hp) at 5500 rpm and 350 N⋅m (260 lb⋅ft) of torque in the range of 1800–4500 rpm. Single turbocharger.

Emissions level Euro 6d-TEMP.

Applications:

- 2018–present Volvo XC40 badged as XC40 T5 AWD

==== B4204T37 ====
The B4204T37 (37) delivers 152 PS (112 kW; 150 hp) at 5000 rpm and 250 N⋅m (180 lb⋅ft) of torque in the range of 1300–4000 rpm. The compression ratio was changed to 11.3:1. Engine variant for cars equipped with a manual gearbox. Single turbocharger.

This engine is only available with the M66H gearbox.

Emissions level Euro 6.

Applications:

- 2016–2018 Volvo V40 II badged as V40 T3
- 2016–2018 Volvo V40CC badged as V40CC T3
- 2016–2018 Volvo S60 II badged as S60 T3
- 2016–2018 Volvo V60 badged as V60 T3

==== B4204T38 ====
The B4204T38 (21) delivers 122 PS (90 kW; 120 hp) at 5000 rpm and 220 N⋅m (160 lb⋅ft) of torque in the range of 1500–4800 rpm. The compression ratio was changed to 11.3:1. Engine variant for cars equipped with a manual gearbox. Single turbocharger.

This engine was only available with the M66H gearbox until model year 2017, afterwards it was only available with the M76 gearbox.

Emissions level Euro 6.

Applications:

- 2016–2019 Volvo V40 II badged as V40 T2

==== B4204T41 ====
The B4204T41 delivers 245 PS (180 kW; 242 hp) at 5500 rpm and 350 N⋅m (260 lb⋅ft) of torque in the range of 1500–4800 rpm. The compression ratio was changed to 8.6:1. Single turbocharger.

Emissions level Euro 6.

Applications:

- 2016–2019 Volvo V40 II badged as V40 T5
- 2017–2019 Volvo V40CC badged as V40CC T5 or V40CC T5 AWD
- 2016–2018 Volvo S60 II badged as S60 T5
- 2016–2018 Volvo V60 badged as V60 T5
- 2016–2017 Volvo XC60 badged as XC60 T5

==== B4204T43 ====
The B4204T43 (A0) delivers 367 PS (270 kW; 362 hp) at 6000 rpm and 470 N⋅m (350 lb⋅ft) of torque in the range of 3100–5100 rpm. The compression ratio was changed to 8.6:1. Turbocharger and supercharger.

This engine is only available with the AW TG-81SC gearbox.

Emissions level Euro 6.

Applications:

- 2017–2018 Volvo S60 II badged as S60 Polestar
- 2017–2018 Volvo V60 badged as V60 Polestar

==== B4204L43 ====
The B4204L43 delivers 350 PS (257 kW; 345 hp) at 6000 rpm and 450 N⋅m (330 lb⋅ft) of torque in the range of 3000–5000 rpm. Turbocharger and supercharger.

This engine is only available with the AW TG-81SC gearbox.

Applications:

- 2024-present Lynk & Co 03 / 领克03 badged as 03+Racing, 03+TCR Cyan

==== B4204T44 ====
The B4204T44 (AL) delivers 190 PS (140 kW; 187 hp) at 5000 rpm and 350 N⋅m (260 lb⋅ft) of torque in the range of 1400–4000 rpm. The compression ratio was changed to 10.8:1. Single turbocharger.

This engine is only available with the gearbox.

Emissions level Euro 6.

Applications:

- 2020–present Volvo V60 II badged as V60 T4'
- 2018–present Volvo XC60 II badged as XC60 T4
- 2018–present Volvo S90L badged as S90长轴距 T4 (Note: Referred to as S90 China Version T4 by Volvo or informally as S90L T4)
- 2018–2025 Volvo V90 II badged as V90 T4

==== B4204T45 ====
The B4204T45 (??) delivers 253 PS (186 kW; 250 hp) at 5500 rpm and 350 N⋅m (260 lb⋅ft) of torque in the range of 1700–5000 rpm. The rear electric motor (ERAD) delivers 87 PS (64 kW; 86 hp) and 240 N⋅m (180 lb⋅ft) of torque. Turbocharger and supercharger.

This engine is only available with an automatic gearbox.

Emissions level Euro 6d-TEMP.

Applications:

- 2020–2024 Volvo S60 III badged as S60 T6, S60 T6 AWD or S60 T6 Twin Engine
- 2019–present Volvo V60 II badged as V60 T8, V60 T8 AWD or V60 T8 Twin Engine

==== B4204T46 ====
The B4204T46 (BF) delivers 253 PS (186 kW; 250 hp) at 5500 rpm and 400 N⋅m (300 lb⋅ft) of torque in the range of 1700–5000 rpm. The rear electric motor (ERAD) delivers 87 PS (64 kW; 86 hp) and 240 N⋅m (180 lb⋅ft) of torque. Turbocharger and supercharger.

Battery capacity was 10.4 kWh for model year 2019. It was increased to 11.6 kWh for model year 2020.

This engine is only available with the AW TG-81SD gearbox.

Emissions level Euro 6d-TEMP.

Applications:

- 2020–2024 Volvo S60 II badged as S60 T6 AWD
- 2019–present Volvo V60 II badged as V60 T6 Twin Engine, V60 T6 Twin Engine AWD or V60 T6 Twin Engine eAWD
- 2021–present Volvo XC60 II badged as XC60 Recharge T6 or V60 T6 AWD Recharge

==== B4204T47 ====
The B4204T47 (AC) delivers 190 PS (140 kW; 187 hp) at 4700 rpm and 300 N⋅m (220 lb⋅ft) of torque in the range of 1400–4000 rpm. The compression ratio was changed to 11.3:1. Single turbocharger.

This engine is only available with the AW TG-81SC gearbox.

Emissions level Euro 6d-TEMP.

Applications:

- 2019–present Volvo XC40 badged as XC40 T4 or XC40 T4 AWD

==== B4204T48 ====
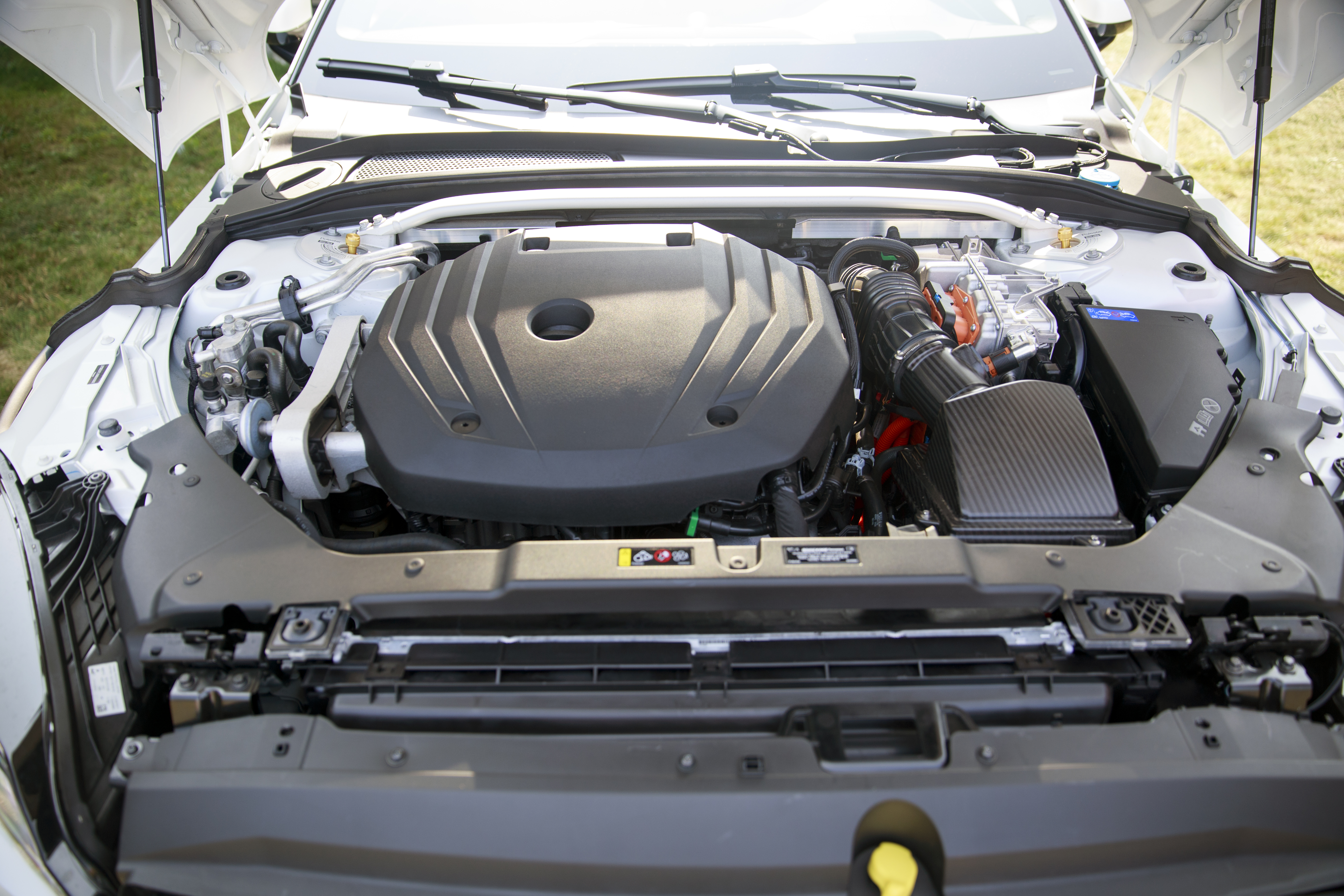
The B4204T48 in a Polestar 1

The B4204T48 (BT) delivers 318 PS (234 kW; 314 hp) at 5800–6100 rpm and 430 N⋅m (317 lb⋅ft) of torque at 4500 rpm. The rear electric motor (ERAD) delivers 87 PS (64 kW; 86 hp) and 240 N⋅m (180 lb⋅ft) of torque. Turbocharger and supercharger.

Battery capacity is 11.6 kWh.

This engine is only available with the AW TG-81SD gearbox.

Emissions level Euro 6d-TEMP.

Applications:

- 2020–2022 Volvo S60 III badged as S60 Polestar Engineered or S60 T8 Twin Engine Polestar Engineered
- 2020–2022 Volvo V60 II badged as V60 Polestar Engineered or V60 T8 Twin Engine Polestar Engineered
- 2020–2022 Volvo XC60 II badged as XC60 Polestar Engineered or XC60 T8 Twin Engine Polestar Engineered
- 2019–2022 Polestar 1 badged as Polestar 1

==== B4204T49 ====
•Power Output: 246 kW (335 hp) at 6000 rpm

•Torque: 430 Nm at 4500 rpm

•Applications:

- 2020–present Volvo XC60 T8 Twin Engine Polestar
- 2020–2024 Volvo S60 T8 Twin Engine Polestar Engineered

==== B4204T52 ====
•Power Output: 186 kW (253 hp) at 5500 rpm

•Torque: 350 Nm between 2600–5000 rpm

•Applications:

- 2020–present Volvo XC60 T6 AWD Twin Engine
- 2020–present Volvo V60 T6 Twin Engine

==== B4204T53 ====
•Power Output: 233 kW (317 hp) at 6000 rpm

•Torque: 400 Nm between 3000–5400 rpm

•Applications:

- 2020–present Volvo XC60 T8 AWD Twin Engine
- 2020–2024 Volvo S60 T8 Twin Engine

==== B4204T56 ====
•Power Output: 228 kW (310 hp) at 6000 rpm

•Maximum Rated Power: 253 kW (344 hp) at 6000 rpm

•Torque: 400 Nm between 3000–4800 rpm

•Applications:

- 2020–present Volvo XC60 T8 AWD Twin Engine
- 2021–present Volvo S90 T8 AWD Twin Engine
- 2024-Present Volvo V90 T8 AWD Twin Engine

==== B4204T57 ====
•Power Output: 233 kW (317 hp) at 6000 rpm

•Torque: 400 Nm between 3000–5400 rpm

•Applications:

- 2020–present Volvo XC60 T8 AWD Twin Engine
- 2020–2024 Volvo S60 T8 Twin Engine
- 2020–present Volvo V60 T8 Twin Engine

==== B4204TSH ====
•Power Output: 233.5 kW (313 hp) at 6000 rpm

•Torque: 400 Nm between 3000–5400 rpm

•Applications:

- 2022–present Volvo XC90 T8 Recharge
- 2022–present Volvo XC60 T8 Recharge
- 2022–present Volvo S90 T8 Recharge
- 2022–2024 Volvo S60 T8 Recharge
- 2022–present Volvo V60 T8 Recharge

== Diesel (VED4) (2013-2024) ==
=== 2.0 ===
All 2.0 L (1,969 cc) diesel engines have a bore of 82 mm (3.2 in) and a stroke of 93.2 mm (3.7 in) with a compression ratio of 15.8:1. All engines are turbocharged and intercooled, certain variants are twin turbocharged. Some variants additionally are equipped with Variable Nozzle Turbine (VNT) turbochargers. In order to achieve injection pressures of up to 2500 bar all engines are equipped with a belt driven fuel pump. High power variants are equipped with balancer shafts and all variants have a mechanical water pump. Volvo has ceased production of all diesel engines, with the last diesel-equipped vehicle built in March 2024.

==== D420T2 / D4204T2 ====
The D420T2 / D4204T2 (K2) delivers 235 PS (173 kW; 232 hp) at 4000 rpm and 480 N⋅m (350 lb⋅ft) of torque in the range of 1750–2250 rpm. The BISG delivers 14 PS (10 kW; 14 hp) at 3000 rpm and 50 N⋅m (37 lb⋅ft) of torque in the range of 0–2300 rpm. Twin turbochargers.

This engine is only available with the AWF8G55 gearbox.

Emissions level Euro 6d-TEMP.

Applications:

- 2020–2024 Volvo XC60 II badged as XC60 B5 AWD
- 2020–2024 Volvo XC90 II badged as XC90 B5 AWD

==== D420T8 / D4204T8 ====
The D420T8 / D4204T8 (K5) delivers 197 PS (145 kW; 194 hp) at 4000 rpm and 420 N⋅m (310 lb⋅ft) of torque in the range of 1750–2750 rpm. The BISG delivers 14 PS (10 kW; 14 hp) at 3000 rpm and 50 N⋅m (37 lb⋅ft) of torque in the range of 0–2300 rpm. Twin turbochargers.

This engine is only available with the AWF8G55 gearbox.

Emissions level Euro 6d-Temp.

Applications:

- 2020–2024 Volvo XC60 II badged as XC60 B4 AWD

==== D4204T4 ====
The D4204T4 (AR) originally delivered 150 PS (110 kW; 148 hp) at 4250 rpm, and 350 N⋅m (260 lb⋅ft) of torque in the range of 1500–2500 rpm. Upgraded to 163 PS (120 kW; 161 hp) at 4250 rpm, and 400 N⋅m (300 lb⋅ft) of torque in the range of 1500–2500 rpm. Twin turbochargers.

Emissions level Euro 6, later upgraded to emissions level Euro 6d-TEMP.

Applications:

- 2017–2018 Volvo S60CC badged as S60CC D3 AWD
- 2016–2018 Volvo V60CC badged as V60CC D3
- 2016–2018 Volvo XC60 badged as XC60 D3
- 2019–2024 Volvo V60 II badged as V60 D3 AWD
- 2019–2024 Volvo V60CC II badged as V60CC D3 AWD
- 2018–2024 Volvo XC60 II badged as XC60 D3
- 2017–2024 Volvo V90 II badged as V90 D3 AWD
- 2020–2024 Volvo XC60 II badged as XC60 D4

==== D4204T5 ====
The D4204T5 (73) delivers 181 PS (133 kW; 179 hp) at 4250 rpm and 400 N⋅m (300 lb⋅ft) of torque in the range of 1750–2500 rpm. Twin turbochargers.

This engine is available with the M66, AW TF-71SC and AW TG-81SC gearbox.

Emissions level Euro 6.

Applications:

- 2014–2015 Volvo S60 II badged as S60 D4
- 2014–2015 Volvo V60 badged as V60 D4
- 2014–2016 Volvo S80 II badged as S80 D4
- 2014–2016 Volvo V70 III badged as V70 D4
- 2014–2016 Volvo XC60 badged as XC60 D4
- 2014–2016 Volvo XC70 II badged as XC70 D4

==== D4204T6 ====
The D4204T6 (A7) delivers 190 PS (140 kW; 187 hp) at 4250 rpm and 420 N⋅m (310 lb⋅ft) of torque in the range of 1500–2500 rpm. Single turbocharger.

Emissions level Euro 6.

Applications:

- 2016–2018 Volvo XC90 II badged as XC90 D4 AWD

==== D4204T8 ====
The D4204T8 (74) delivers 120 PS (88 kW; 118 hp) at 3750 rpm and 280 N⋅m (210 lb⋅ft) of torque in the range of 1500–2250 rpm. The compression ratio was changed to 16.0:1. Single turbocharger.

This engine was available with the M66 gearbox until model year 2017, afterwards it was available with the M76 gearbox. All model years are available with the AW TF-71SC gearbox.

Emissions level Euro 6, upgraded to Euro 6d-TEMP.

Applications:

- 2016–2019 Volvo V40 II badged as V40 D2
- 2016–2019 Volvo V40CC badged as V40CC D2
- 2016–2018 Volvo S60 II badged as S60 D2
- 2016–2018 Volvo V60 badged as V60 D2

==== D4204T9 ====
The D4204T9 (79) delivers 150 PS (110 kW; 148 hp) at 3750 rpm and 320 N⋅m (240 lb⋅ft) of torque in the range of 1750–3000 rpm. The compression ratio was changed to 16.0:1. Single turbocharger with VNT. (Note: listed as VTG in the brochure)

This engine was available with the M66F gearbox until model year 2017, afterwards it was available with the M76 gearbox. All model years are available with the AW TF-71SC gearbox.

Emissions level Euro 6, upgraded to Euro 6d-TEMP.

Applications:

- 2016–2019 Volvo V40 II badged as V40 D3
- 2016–2019 Volvo V40CC badged as V40CC D3
- 2018–2024 Volvo XC40 badged as XC40 D3 or XC40 D3 AWD
- 2016–2018 Volvo S60 II badged as S60 D3
- 2016–2019 Volvo V60 badged as V60 D3
- 2016 Volvo V70 III badged as V70 D3
- 2017–2019 Volvo S90 II badged as S90 D3
- 2017–2019 Volvo V90 II badged as V90 D3

==== D4204T11 ====
The D4204T11 (A4) delivers 225 PS (165 kW; 222 hp) at 4250 rpm and 470 N⋅m (350 lb⋅ft) of torque in the range of 1750–2500 rpm. Twin turbochargers.

This engine is only available with the AW TG-81SC gearbox.

Emissions level Euro 6b.

Applications:

- 2016–2018 Volvo S60 II badged as S60 D5
- 2016–2018 Volvo V60 badged as V60 D5
- 2016 Volvo XC90 II badged as XC90 D5 AWD

==== D4204T12 ====
The D4204T12 (A6) delivers 190 PS (140 kW; 187 hp) at 4000 rpm and 400 N⋅m (300 lb⋅ft) of torque in the range of 1750–2500 rpm. Twin turbochargers.

The engine is equipped with a SCR system that has a 14.5 L AdBlue tank.

Emissions level Euro 6d-TEMP.

Applications:

- 2018–2024 Volvo XC40 badged as XC40 D4 AWD

==== D4204T13 ====
The D4204T13 (70) delivers 120 PS (88 kW; 118 hp) at 3750 rpm and 280 N⋅m (210 lb⋅ft) of torque in the range of 1500–2250 rpm. Single turbocharger.

Emissions level Euro 6d-TEMP.

Applications:

- 2019 Volvo V40 II badged as V40 D2
- 2019 Volvo V40CC badged as V40CC D2

==== D4204T14 ====
The D4204T14 (A8) delivers 190 PS (140 kW; 187 hp) at 4250 rpm and 400 N⋅m (300 lb⋅ft) of torque in the range of 1750–2500 rpm. Twin turbochargers.

This engine is available with the M66F and AW TG-81SC gearbox.

Emissions level Euro 6 for CC models, non CC models Euro 6b for model years 2016 to 2018 and for the XC60 II, V60 II emissions level Euro 6d-TEMP.

Applications:

- 2015–2019 Volvo V40 II badged as V40 D4
- 2015–2019 Volvo V40CC badged as V40CC D4
- 2016–2018 Volvo S60 II badged as S60 D4
- 2016–2018 Volvo S60CC badged as S60CC D4
- 2016–2018 Volvo V60 badged as V60 D4
- 2016–2018 Volvo V60CC badged as V60CC D4
- 2019–2024 Volvo V60 II badged as V60 D4 or V60 D4 AWD
- 2019–2024 Volvo V60CC II badged as V60CC D4 AWD
- 2014–2017 Volvo XC60 badged as XC60 D4
- 2017–2024 Volvo XC60 II badged as XC60 D4 or XC60 D4 AWD
- 2016–2024 Volvo S90 II badged as S90 D4 or S90 D4 AWD
- 2016–2024 Volvo V90 II badged as V90 D4 or V90 D4 AWD
- 2016–2024 Volvo V90CC badged as V90CC D4 AWD
- 2015–2024 Volvo XC90 II badged as XC90 D4

==== D4204T16 ====
The D4204T16 (72) delivers 150 PS (110 kW; 148 hp) at 3750 rpm and 320 N⋅m (240 lb⋅ft) of torque in the range of 1750–3000 rpm. The compression ratio was changed to 16.0:1. Single turbocharger.

This engine is available with the M76 R7.0, M66F and AW TG-81SC gearbox.

The engine is equipped with a SCR system that has a 11.5 L AdBlue tank for SPA models or 14.5 L AdBlue tank for CMA models.

Emissions level Euro 6d-TEMP.

Applications:

- 2018–2019 Volvo V40CC badged as V40CC D3
- 2018–2024 Volvo XC40 badged as XC40 D3 or XC40 D3 AWD'
- 2019–2024 Volvo V60 II badged as V60 D3
- 2019–2024 Volvo S90 II badged as S90 D3

==== D4204T20 ====
The D4204T20 (78) delivers 120 PS (88 kW; 118 hp) at 3750 rpm and 280 N⋅m (210 lb⋅ft) of torque in the range of 1500–2250 rpm. Engine variant for cars equipped with an automatic gearbox. Single turbocharger.

Emissions level Euro 6b.

Applications:

- 2016–2018 Volvo S60 II badged as S60 D2
- 2016–2018 Volvo V60 badged as V60 D2
- 2015–2016 Volvo V70 III badged as V70 D2

==== D4204T23 ====
The D4204T23 (65) delivers 235 PS (173 kW; 232 hp) at 4000 rpm and 480 N⋅m (350 lb⋅ft) of torque in the range of 1750–2250 rpm. Twin turbochargers, one with VNT. Equipped with PowerPulse.

This engine is only available with the AW TG-81SC gearbox.

Starting with model year 2018 the engine is equipped with a SCR system that has a 11.5 L AdBlue tank except model year 2018 built between week 43 2017 - 01 2018).

Emissions level Euro 6, for model year 2018 upgraded to emissions level Euro 6d-TEMP.

Applications:

- 2018–2024 Volvo XC60 II badged as XC60 D5 AWD
- 2017–2024 Volvo S90 II badged as S90 D5 AWD
- 2017–2024 Volvo V90 II badged as V90 D5 AWD
- 2017–2024 Volvo V90CC badged as V90CC D5 AWD
- 2017–2024 Volvo XC90 II badged as XC90 D5 AWD
