= Geely Xingyue S =

Compact crossover SUV

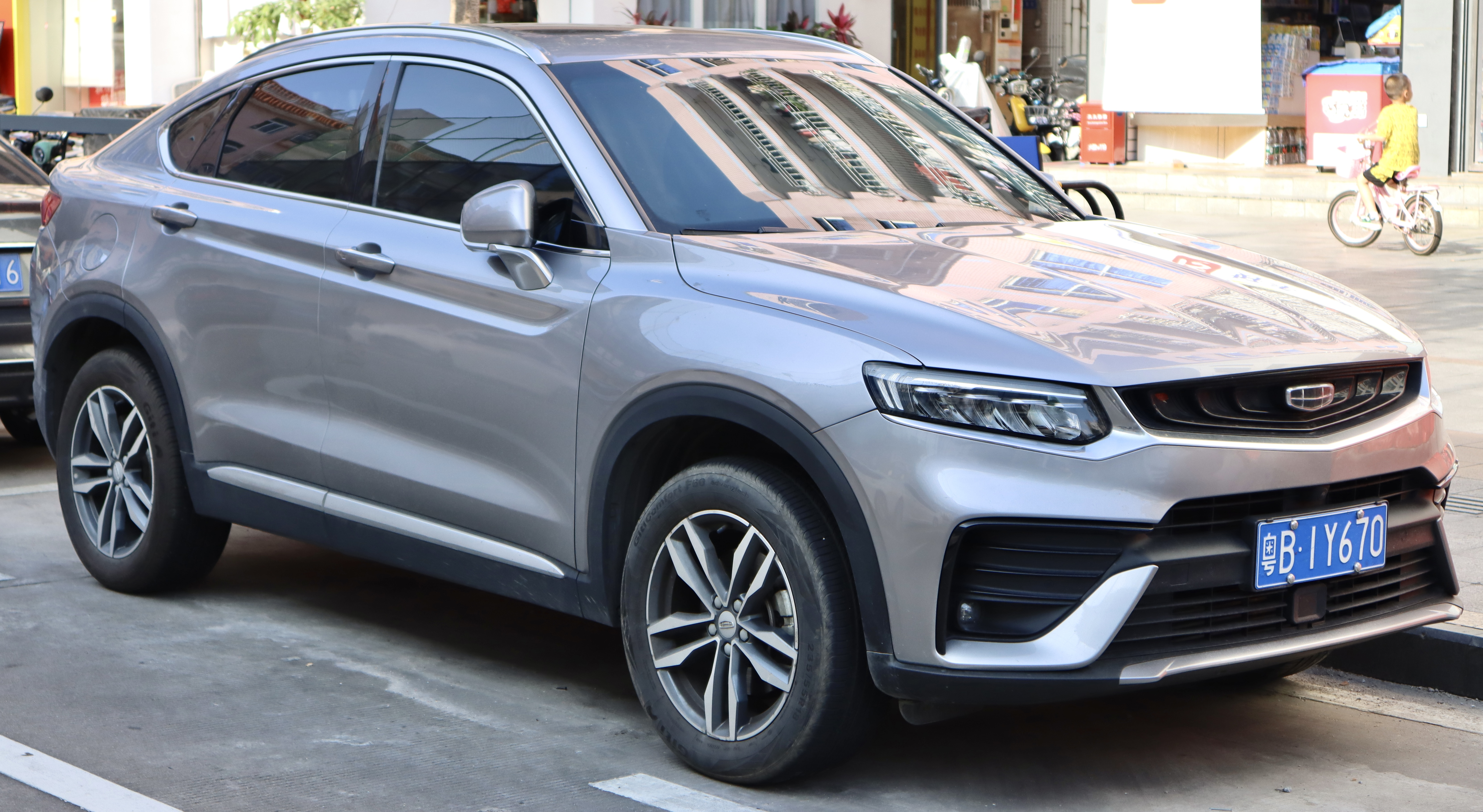

Overview
- Manufacturer: Geely Auto
- Model code: FY11
- Also called: Geely Xingyue (2019–2021); Geely Tugella; Knewstar 001 (Russia)
- Production: 2019–2023 (China); 2020–present (export)
- Assembly: China: Ningbo, Zhejiang; Harbin, Heilongjiang (Yufun Auto); Belarus: Barysaw

Body and chassis
- Class: Compact SUV
- Body style: 5-door coupé SUV
- Layout: Front-engine, front-wheel-drive; Front-engine, four-wheel-drive
- Platform: Compact Modular Architecture

Powertrain
- Engine: Petrol: 1.5 L Volvo JLH-3G15TD G-Power MHEV I3-T; 1.5 L Volvo JLH-3G15TD PHEV I3-T; 2.0 L Volvo JLH-4G20TDB I4-T
- Electric motor: EFAD
- Power output: 140 kW (188 hp; 190 PS) (1.5 L MHEV); 190 kW (255 hp; 258 PS) (1.5 L PHEV); 175 kW (235 hp; 238 PS) (2.0 L)
- Transmission: 8-speed Aisin automatic (350T); 7-speed dual-clutch (300T, 400T)
- Hybrid drivetrain: Plug-in hybrid (400T)
- Electric range: 80 km (49.7 mi) (400T)

Dimensions
- Wheelbase: 2,700 mm (106.3 in)
- Length: 4,605 mm (181.3 in)
- Width: 1,878 mm (73.9 in)
- Height: 1,643 mm (64.7 in)
- Curb weight: 1,630–1,810 kg (3,590–3,990 lb)

The Geely Xingyue S (Chinese: 吉利星越S; pinyin: Jílì xīng yuè S, meaning "star cross"), previously the Geely Xingyue before 2021 is a compact SUV with a sloping rear roofline produced by Geely Auto. It is known in overseas markets as the Geely Tugella.

== Overview ==
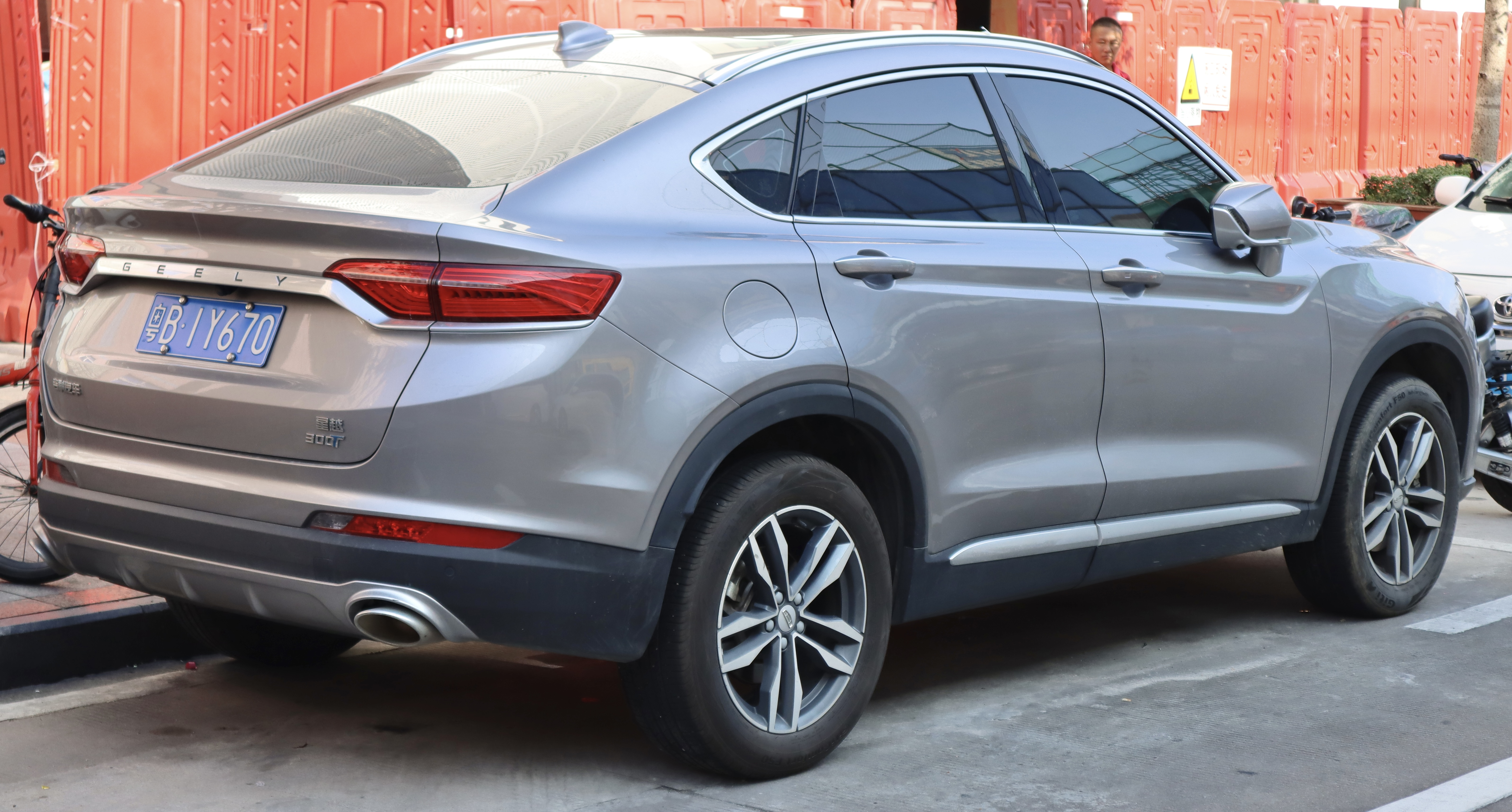
Rear view

The new vehicle was named "FY11" under development, and was released in March 2019 as the Xingyue. The Xingyue is based on the CMA platform.

Engine options for the Geely Xingyue include a petrol-powered 1.5 liter straight-three engine, producing 130 kW (170 hp; 180 PS) and 255 N⋅m (188 lb⋅ft) of torque, and a 2.0 liter straight-four turbo engine producing 175 kW (235 hp; 238 PS) and 350 N⋅m (258 lb⋅ft) of torque. Transmissions include a 7-speed dual-clutch transmission on lower-end models, and a 8-speed Aisin automatic transmission on the highest-spec model, the 350T.

== Model variations ==
All model versions are named for their produced torque, in newton-meters.

300T- The base model, a gas-only, 5-seat SUV, is powered by a 1.5TD, 3-cylinder, turbocharged direct injection engine. The transmission is a 7-speed wet dual clutch.

350T- A power-focused sports model, similar to the 300T, but with a 2.0T 4-cylinder turbocharged engine that produces 235 hp (175 kW; 238 PS). More power comes through in the form of an Aisin 8-speed transmission. Features a top speed of 130 mph (210 km/h) (claimed).

400T- Geely's flagship Xing Yue model, and the only one with the ability to run off of pure electricity, albeit for a very limited 80 km (50 mi). Despite the lowest top speed of any Xing Yue (a claimed 121 mph (195 km/h)), it produces a modest 254 hp (189 kW; 258 PS).

== Knewstar 001 ==
In September 2024, the Geely Tugella was withdrawn from Geely's line-up in Russia, and was reintroduced under a new brand with a revised front fascia as the Knewstar 001. Production of the vehicle were moved to a facility owned by Yufun Auto in Harbin, China with an annual capacity of 120,000 units. The plant located near the Russian border and is focused on exports to Russia. The Knewstar line will eventually consist of three models, including the Knewstar 002 compact SUV and a D-segment sedan. Industry experts and analysts noted that the brand is an effort to distance Geely with Russia due to the threat of international sanctions during the Russian invasion of Ukraine.

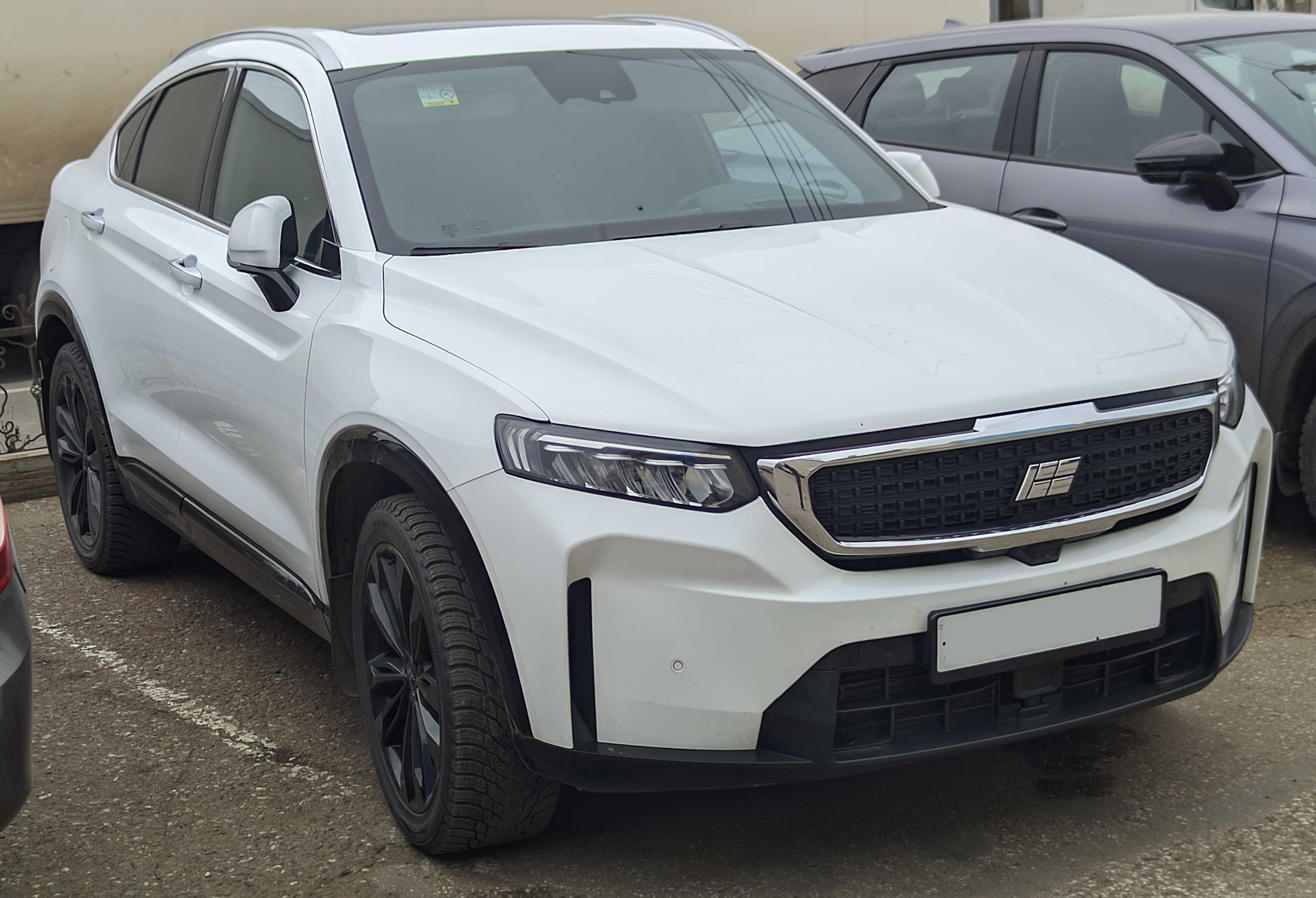
2024 Knewstar 001

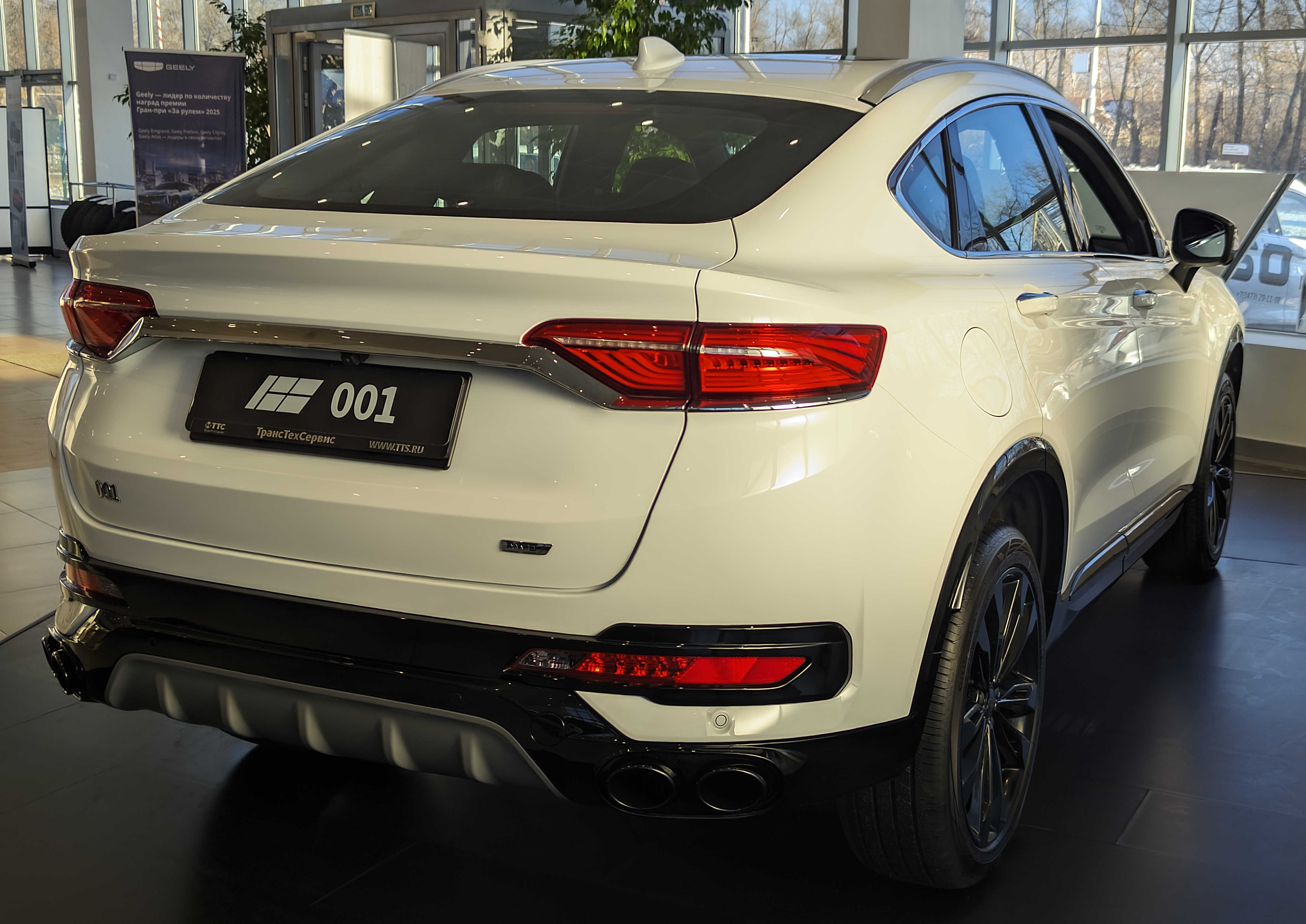
Rear view

== Sales ==
Calendar Year	China
2019	23,944
2020	25,339
