= Lynk & Co 01 =

Compact crossover SUV

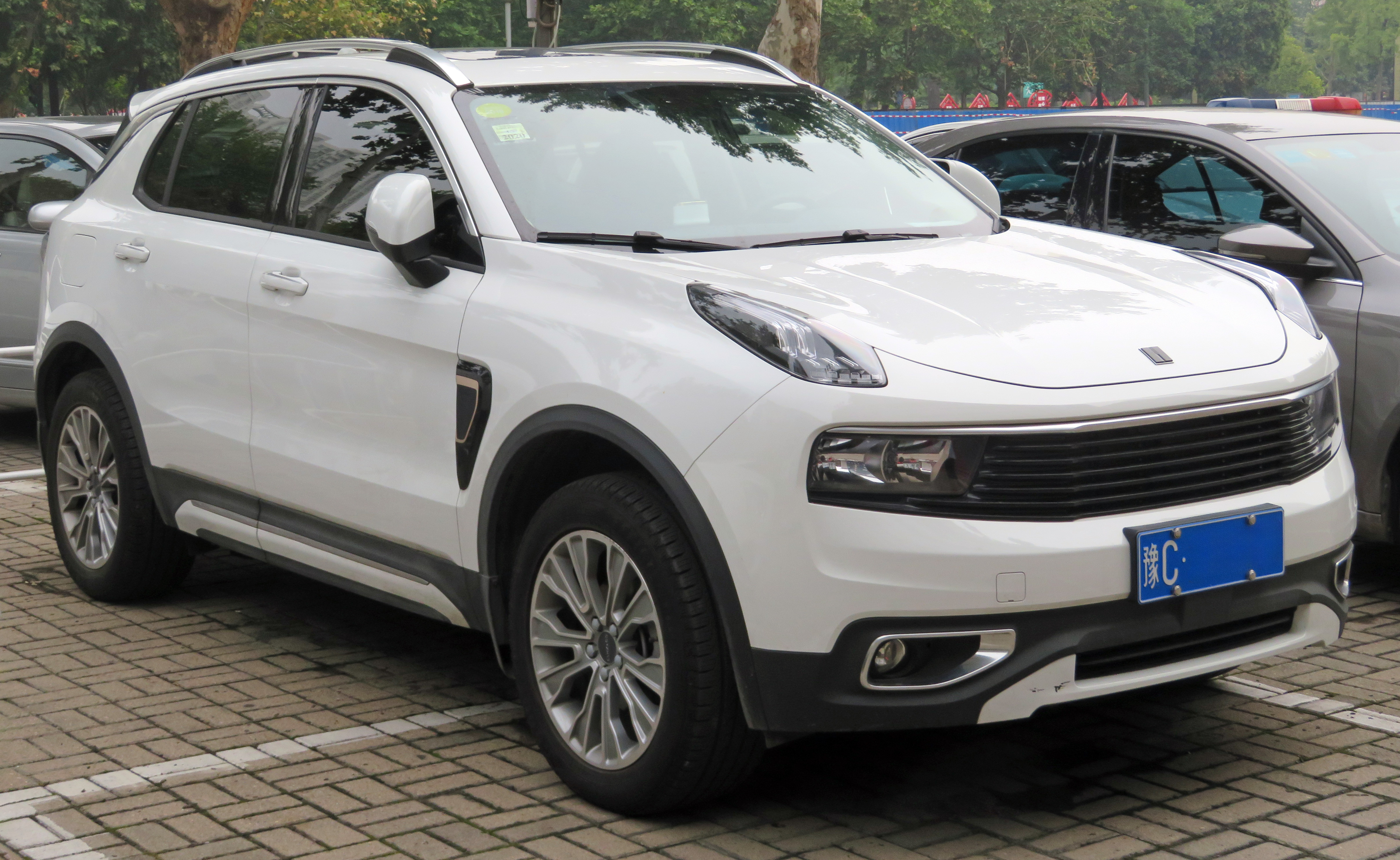

Overview
- Manufacturer: Lynk & Co (Geely)
- Model code: GX6, with the Facelift CX11
- Production: 2017–present
- Assembly: China: Ningbo, Zhejiang (Meishu plant)
- Designer: Peter Horbury, Eric Leong; Alex Saito (facelift)

Body and chassis
- Class: Compact crossover SUV (C)
- Body style: 5-door SUV
- Layout: Front-engine, front-wheel-drive
- Platform: CMA platform
- Related: Lynk & Co 05; Volvo XC40

Powertrain
- Engine: 1.5 L JLH-3G15TD (hybrid); 1.5 L DHE15-ESZ turbo I3; 2.0 L Drive-E-T4 B4204T30 turbo I4
- Electric motor: 40–60 kW Permanent magnet synchronous
- Power output: 190–254 PS (140–187 kW; 187–251 hp); 197 PS (145 kW; 194 hp) (01 HEV)}; 261 PS (192 kW; 257 hp) (01 PHEV)
- Transmission: 6-speed manual; 7-speed DCT; 8-speed automatic
- Hybrid drivetrain: Plug-in hybrid FHEV
- Battery: 9 kWh Lithium-ion
- Electric range: 70 km (43 mi) (WLTP, PHEV)

Dimensions
- Wheelbase: 2,734 mm (107.6 in)
- Length: 4,512 mm (177.6 in)
- Width: 1,857 mm (73.1 in)
- Height: 1,673 mm (65.9 in)
- Kerb weight: 1,750 kg (3,860 lb)

The Lynk & Co 01 (Chinese: 领克01; pinyin: Lǐng kè 01) is a compact crossover SUV manufactured by Geely owned Chinese-Swedish automaker Lynk & Co. It was the first model for Lynk & Co and it was developed by China Euro Vehicle Technology AB (CEVT), a Swedish subsidiary of Geely.

== History ==
Lynk & Co 01 was formerly codenamed Geely CX11 during its development. First revealed online in October 2016, it went on sale on 4 August 2017. The PHEV version went out for the market on 7 July 2018, as the very first luxury hybrid SUV produced by Lynk & Co. The electric recharge mileage of it initially reached 51 kilometres (32 mi).

== Model details ==
The Lynk & Co 01 is based on the Compact Modular Architecture platform, developed by China Euro Vehicle Technology AB (CEVT), a platform which also underpins the Volvo XC40. The 01 will share much of its components with the XC40, including its electrical architecture, engines and safety systems.

The Lynk & Co 01 is equipped with a 10.2-inch multimedia screen. One of the "Pro" models provides with timely four-wheel drive. The Speech Recognition System is able to take part in media, navigation system, phone and air conditioning.

The car is controlled by a shared digital key that can allow owners to provide access to other Lynk & Co cars. The car is 4,530 mm (178.3 in) long and is powered by a 1.5-litre 3-cylinder or a 2.0-litre 4-cylinder petrol engine from Volvo and mated to a manual gearbox or seven-speed automatic. The Lynk & Co 01 was initially manufactured by Volvo in Luqiao district in the city of Taizhou, China, in the same production line as Volvo XC40 and Polestar, but production was later moved to the Lynk & Co Meishan island plant 50 km from Ningbo.

Lynk & Co 01 received 5.5-stars rating in C-NCAP crash test. The overall rating reaches 60.1 points.

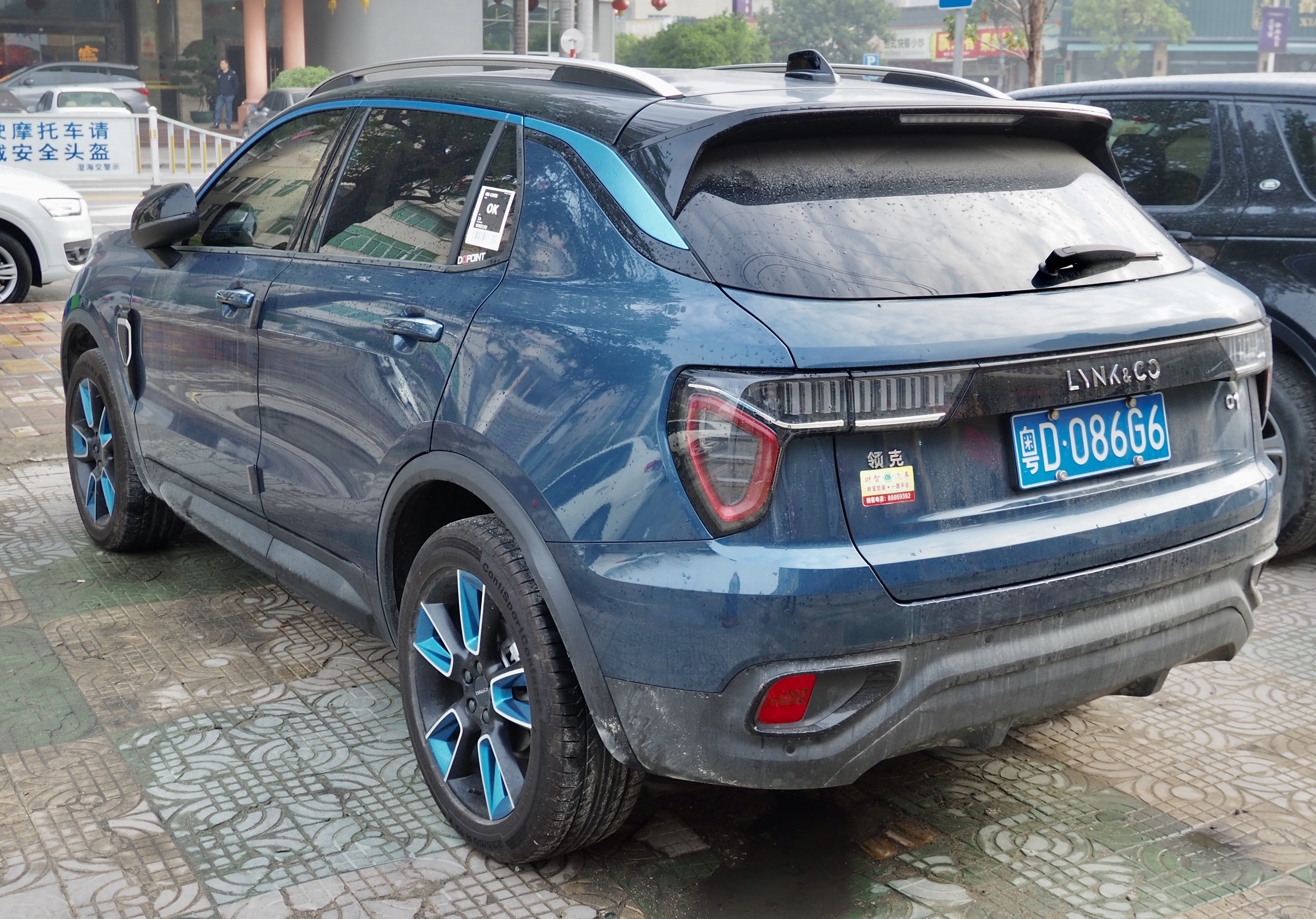
Rear view

=== 2021 facelift ===
A facelift was launched for the 2021 model year and the launch of the European market. For the European market, there will be no trim levels with the Lynk & Co 01 with the only options being the powertrain and paint colour. Standard equipment for the 01 offered in Europe includes a large central touchscreen, sat-nav, a social media camera, and over-the-air updates for the in-car tech systems.

The Lynk & Co 01 was launched in Kuwait in November 2021 with two trim levels "Hyper" and "Hyper Pro". One 2.0 powertrain is available, 2.0L B4204T30 Drive-E-T4 with 215 hp (160 kW; 218 PS) and an 8-speed FWD automatic transmission, no hybrid drivetrain. Furthermore, colour options are White, Black and Red.

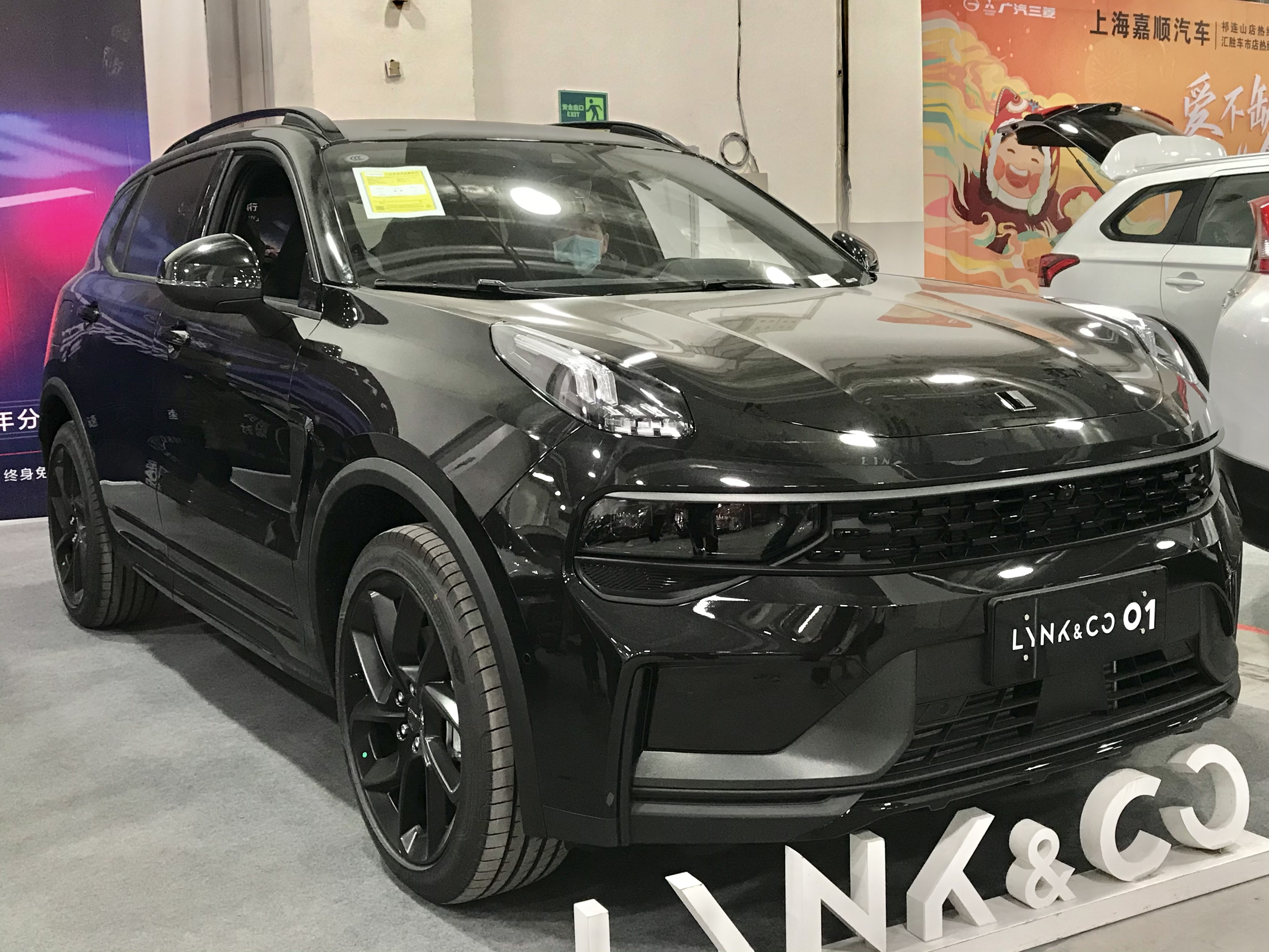
2021 facelift

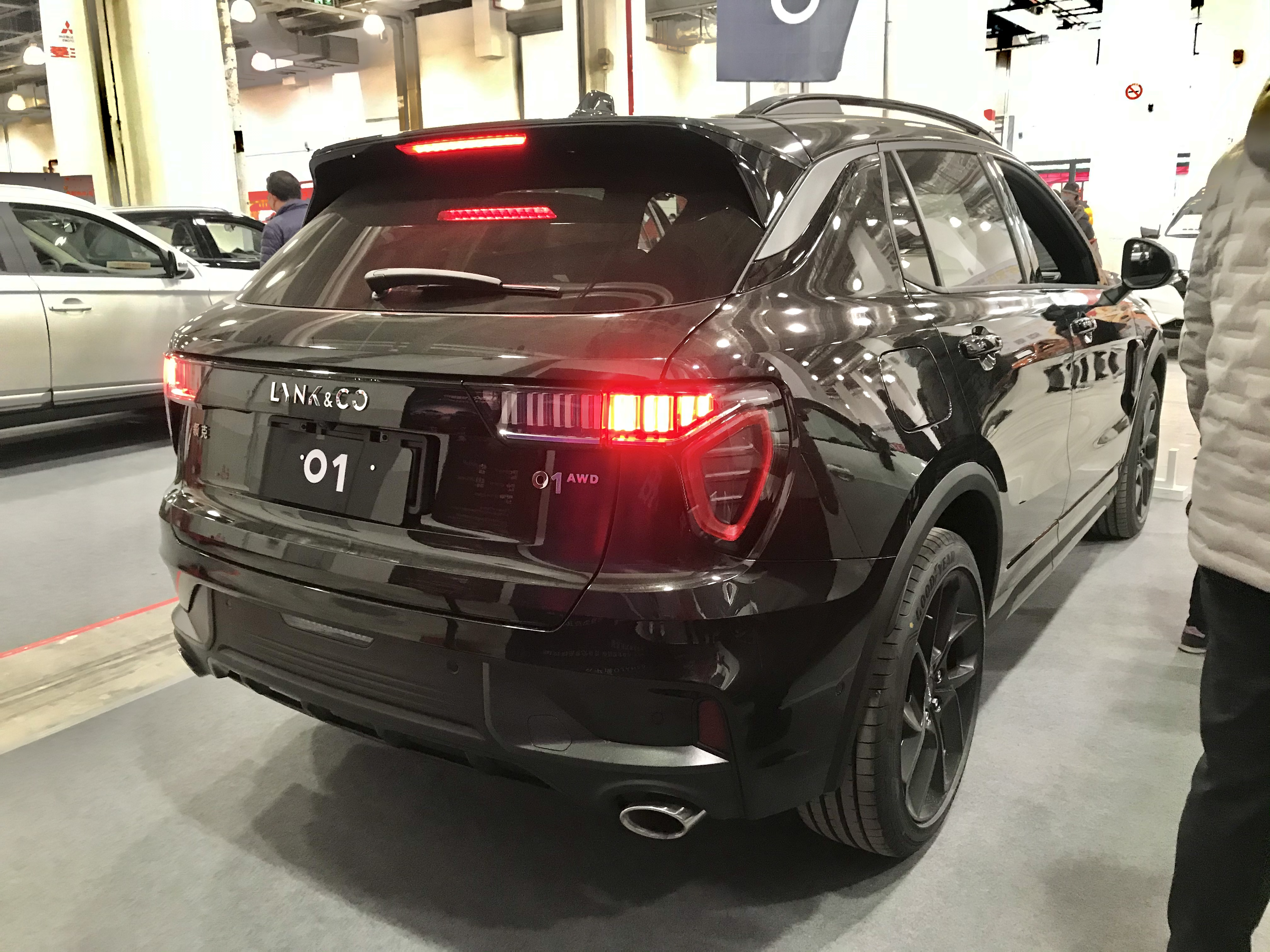
Rear view

=== 2022 facelift ===
The 01 received a facelift for the 2022 model year and newly introduced 01 hybrid versions with up to 245 hp (183 kW; 248 PS) was also introduced. The 01 hybrid versions is available as EM-F and EM-P versions. The 01 EM-F and EM-P features a new hybrid powertrain called the LYNK E-MOTIVE. It is based on Geely's Hi-X hybrid system. The LYNK E-MOTIVE uses a 1.5-litre three-cylinder petrol engine (DHE15-ESZ) for 148 hp (110 kW; 150 PS) mated to a three-speed DHT Pro hybrid gearbox and uses a 40 kW (54 hp; 54 PS) electric motor. The peak thermal efficiency of the engine reaches 43.32% and can reduce fuel consumption by up to 40% and the vehicle has an efficient fuel consumption of 4.88 L/100 km (48.2 mpg_{‑US}) on the WLTC cycle. The EM-F is a HEV (Hybrid Electric Vehicle) and the EM-P is a PHEV (Plug-in Hybrid EV). Lynk & Co claims that up to 70 kilometres (43 mi) of pure electric range can be achieved with the PHEV on the WLTP cycle. The PHEV features a 132 kW (177 hp; 179 PS) petrol engine, a 60 kW (80 hp; 82 PS) electric motor and a standard consumption of 1.1 L/100 km (260 mpg_{‑imp}; 210 mpg_{‑US}) for the Lynk & Co 01 PHEV.

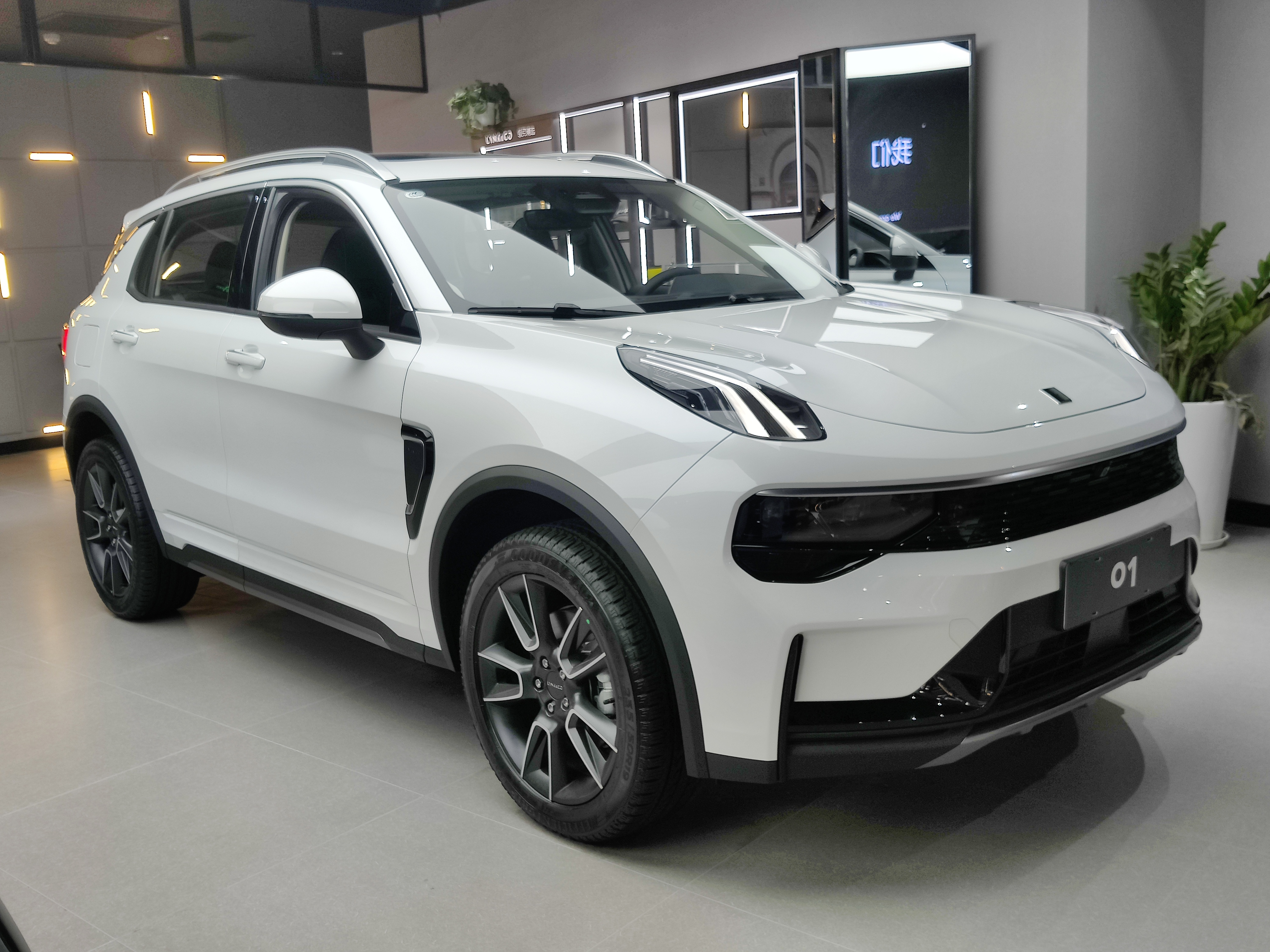
2022 facelift

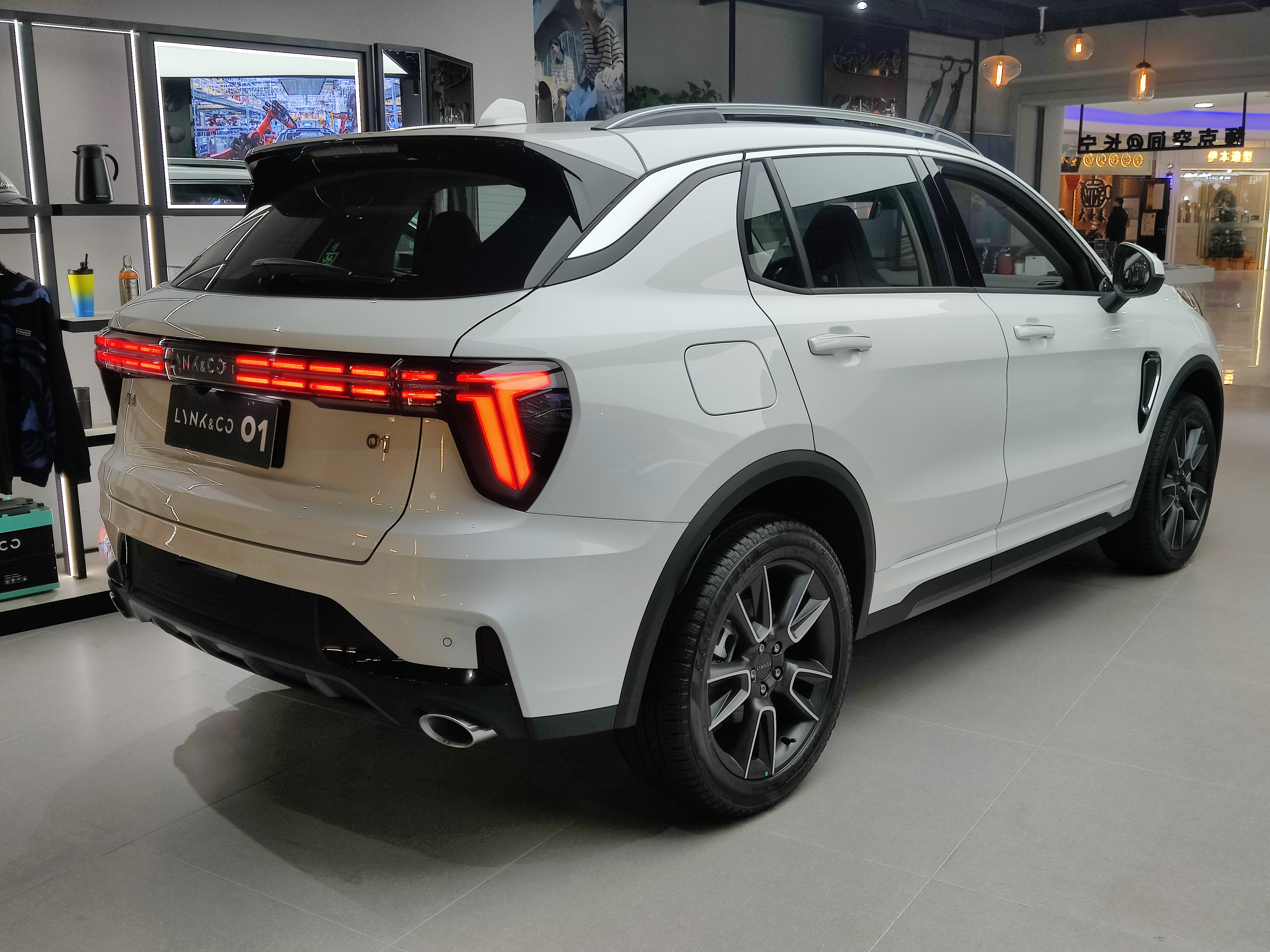
Rear view

== Safety ==
Euro NCAP test results Lynk & Co 01 1.5 HEV (LHD) (2021)
Test	Points	%
Overall:	5 /5 stars	
Adult occupant:	36.8	96%
Child occupant:	42.9	87%
Pedestrian:	38.7	71%
Safety assist:	13.1	81%

== Sales ==
Sales in China started in 2017. Lynk & Co delivered the first vehicles in Europe in spring 2021. The hybrid 01, which shares the platform with the Volvo XC40 is the first model to be available. A subscription membership model was also launched in Europe. Only the HEV and PHEV versions are offered in Europe, but not the petrol variant.

Year	China		
Year	01	HEV	PHEV
2020	30,836	—	783
2021	45,868	—	4,380
2022	13,820	5,380	17,286
2023	15,275	1,107	11,413
2024	8,267	—	14,642
2025	9,190	—	32 (EM-P)
