= Volvo XC70 (2025) =

Mid-size hybrid crossover SUV by Volvo

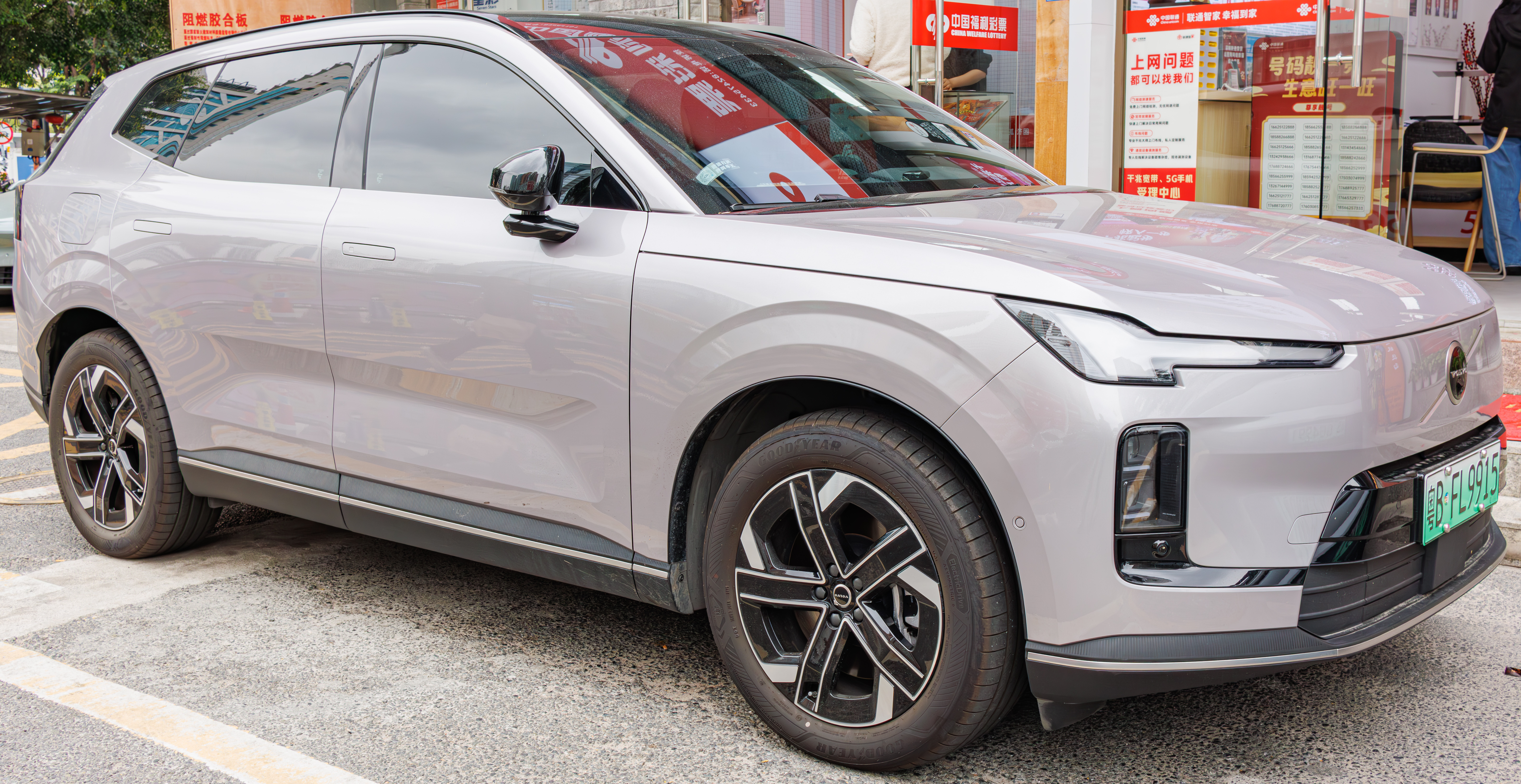

Overview
- Manufacturer: Volvo Cars
- Model code: V446K
- Production: August 2025 – present
- Assembly: China: Taizhou
- Designer: Will Chen, Tang Huan

Body and chassis
- Class: Mid-size luxury crossover SUV
- Body style: 5-door SUV
- Layout: Front-engine, front-motor, front-wheel-drive Front-engine, dual-motor, all-wheel-drive
- Platform: Scalable Modular Architecture
- Related: Lynk & Co 08

Powertrain
- Engine: Petrol plug-in hybrid: 1.5-liter BHE15-BFZ turbocharged I4
- Transmission: 3-speed DHT
- Hybrid drivetrain: Series-parallel/PHEV
- Battery: 21.22 kWh LFP; 39.63 kWh NMC
- Range: Approx. 500 mi (805 km) (CLTC)
- Electric range: 61–112 mi (98–180 km) (CLTC)

Dimensions
- Wheelbase: 2,895 mm (114.0 in)
- Length: 4,815 mm (189.6 in)
- Width: 1,890 mm (74.4 in)
- Height: 1,650 mm (65.0 in)

The Volvo XC70 is a plug-in hybrid mid-size luxury crossover SUV manufactured by Volvo Cars. The vehicle is built on the Scalable Modular Architecture (SMA) platform, a re-branded Compact Modular Architecture (CMA) from Geely. It is produced in China at the Volvo Taizhou factory.

== Design and equipment ==
The XC70 uses a design language similar to the Volvo ES90 and Volvo EX90. It uses the brand's "Thor's Hammer" matrix headlights. There are also LED taillights integrated into the rear glass alongside another set of LED taillights on the sides of the rear glass.

The interior uses a two-spoke steering wheel, a 92-inch-wide heads-up display, a 15.4-inch central touchscreen, a 12.3-inch digital instrument cluster.

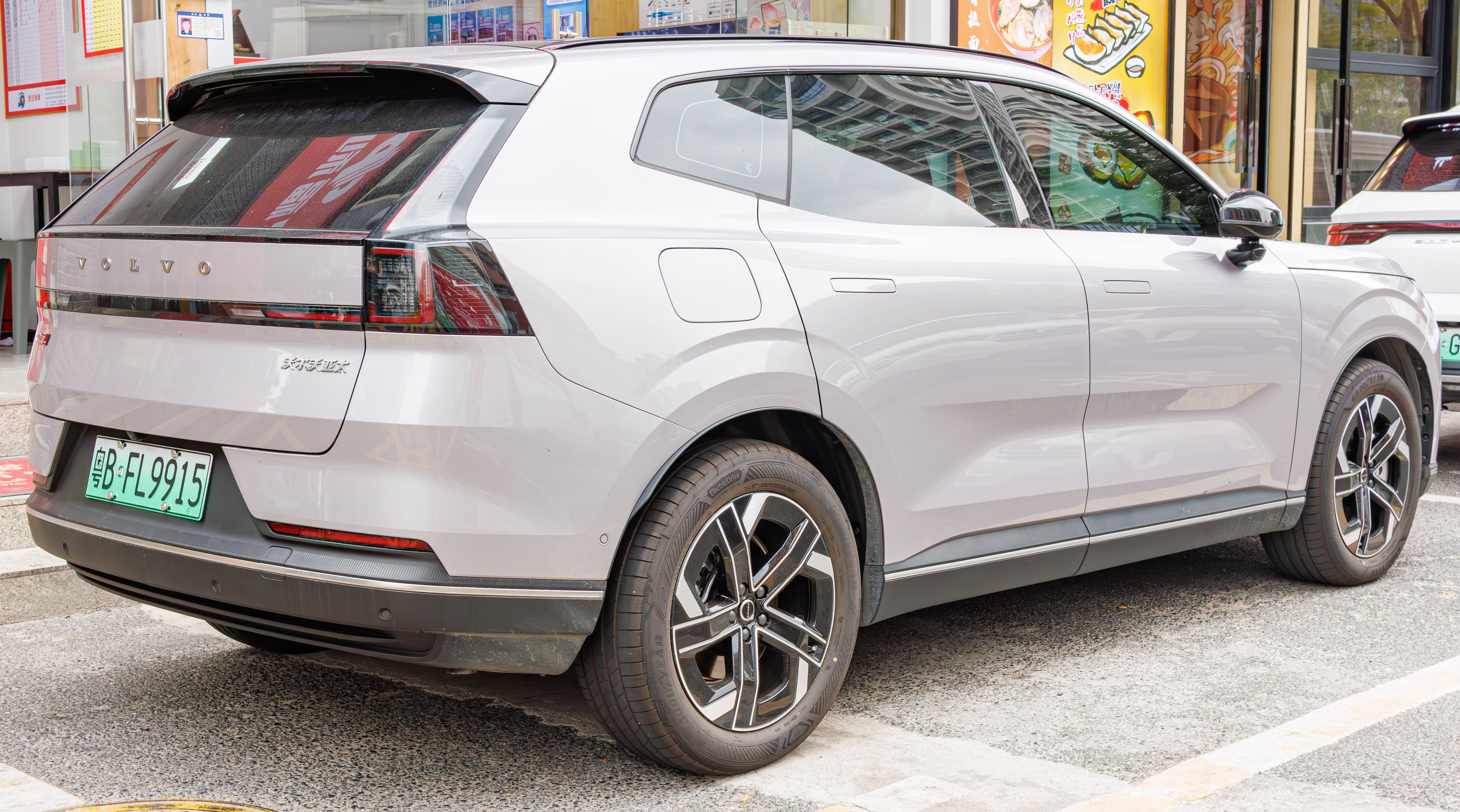
Rear view

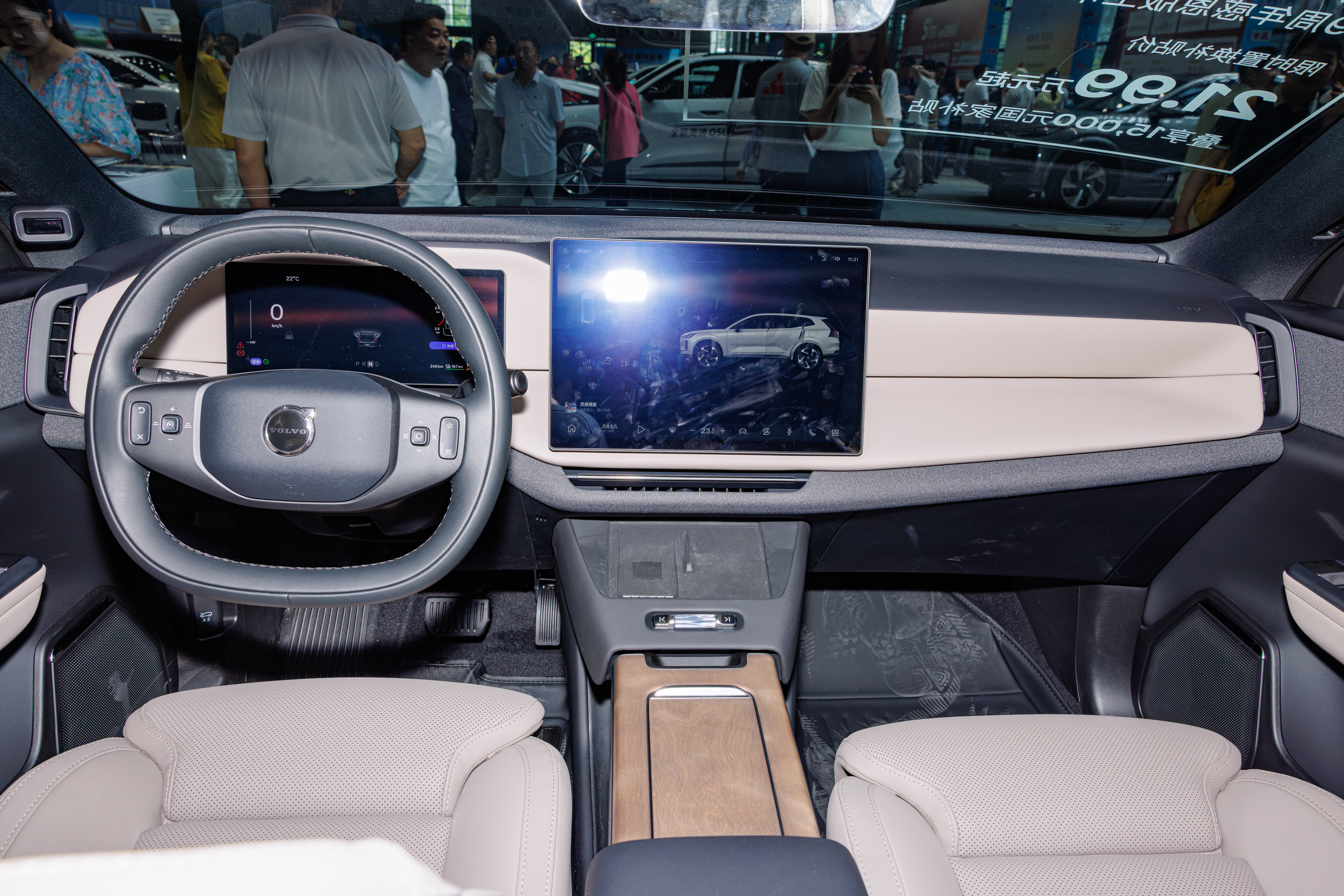
Interior

== Powertrain ==
The XC70 features a plug-in hybrid (series-parallel hybrid) system combining a 1.5-liter turbocharged engine with P1+P3 and P4 layout electric motors, paired with a 3-speed dedicated hybrid transmission (DHT). It can travel up to 200 kilometres (124 mi) on pure electric range.

Front-wheel-drive models are rated at 234 kW (318 PS; 314 hp); and all-wheel-drive models are rated at 340 kW (462 PS; 456 hp). Front-wheel-drive have an all-electric range of 116 kilometres (72 miles); and all-wheel-drive models have an all-electric range of 211 kilometres (131 miles). They use the 21.2 kWh and 39.6 kWh lithium iron phosphate batteries respectively.

== Sales ==
Year	China
2025	11,327
