= Lynk & Co 08 =

Plug-in hybrid mid-size crossover SUV

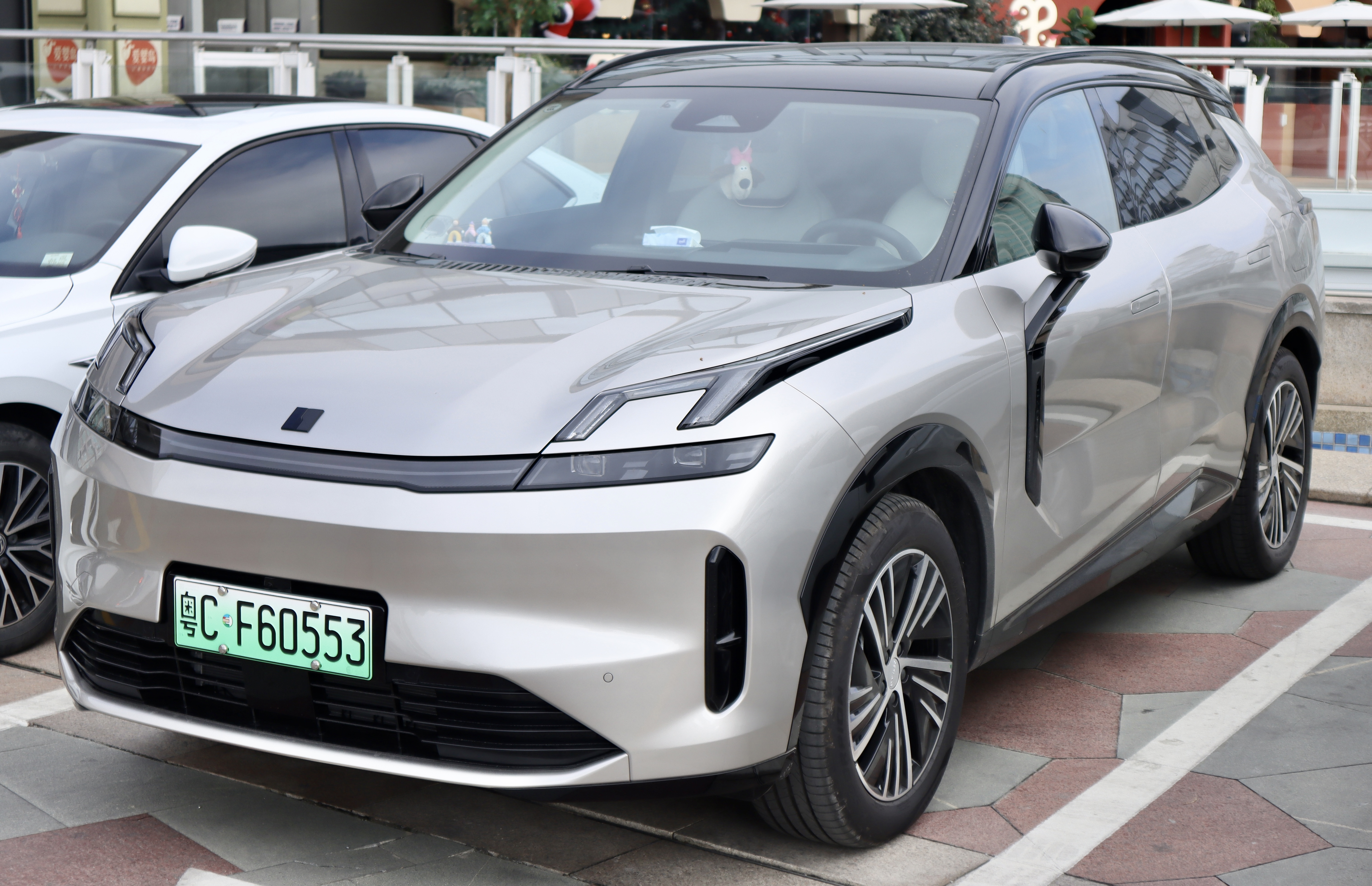

Overview
- Manufacturer: Lynk & Co (Zeekr)
- Model code: DX11
- Production: August 2023 – present
- Assembly: China: Ningbo, Zhejiang (Meishu plant)
- Designer: Øyvind Norheim

Body and chassis
- Class: Mid-size crossover SUV (D)
- Body style: 5-door SUV
- Layout: Front-engine, front single motor, front-wheel-drive; Front-engine, dual-motor, four-wheel-drive
- Platform: CMA Evo platform
- Related: Volvo XC70

Powertrain
- Engine: Petrol plug-in hybrid: 1.5 L BHE15-BFZ I4 turbo; 1.5 L BHE15-CFZ I4 turbo
- Transmission: 3-speed DHT
- Hybrid drivetrain: Series-parallel plug-in hybrid
- Battery: 21.2 kWh mixed LFP-NMC CATL; 28.3 kWh LFP; 38.2 kWh Golden Brick LFP VREMT; 39.6 kWh NMC CATL; 39.8 kWh NMC SVOLT
- Range: 1,400 km (870 mi)
- Electric range: 102–205 km (63–127 mi) (WLTP); 120–245 km (75–152 mi) (CLTC)
- Plug-in charging: V2L: 6.0 kW

Dimensions
- Wheelbase: 2,848 mm (112.1 in)
- Length: 4,820 mm (189.8 in)
- Width: 1,915 mm (75.4 in)
- Height: 1,685 mm (66.3 in)
- Curb weight: 2,112 kg (4,656 lb)

The Lynk & Co 08 (Chinese: 领克08; pinyin: Lǐng kè 08) is a mid-size crossover SUV manufactured by Chinese automaker Lynk & Co.

== History ==
The design of the 08 was previewed by the Lynk & Co The Next Day concept, which was presented in China on 7 June 2022, showcasing the upcoming design language for the entire Lynk&Co lineup.

== Overview ==
The 08 was officially unveiled 25 March 2023.

The 08's exterior features several distinct design elements, including the brand's signature two-line daytime running lights and split headlights, door mirrors mounted on a vertical element stretching from the base of the front doors, and a segment rear light bar.

The interior uses a minimalistic design with an oval-shaped steering wheel, 12.3-inch instrument panel, a 15.4-inch floating central display and a 92-inch AR heads-up display. Additional features include a facial recognition sensor mounted on the A-pillar and a Harman Kardon sound system.

A facelifted model of the 08 for the 2026 model year was revealed in August 2025. It features updated front and rear fascias, Qualcomm Snapdragon 8295 infotainment system chip, and the addition of the next-generation Nvidia Drive Thor-U SoC which has a peak computing power of 700 TOPS.

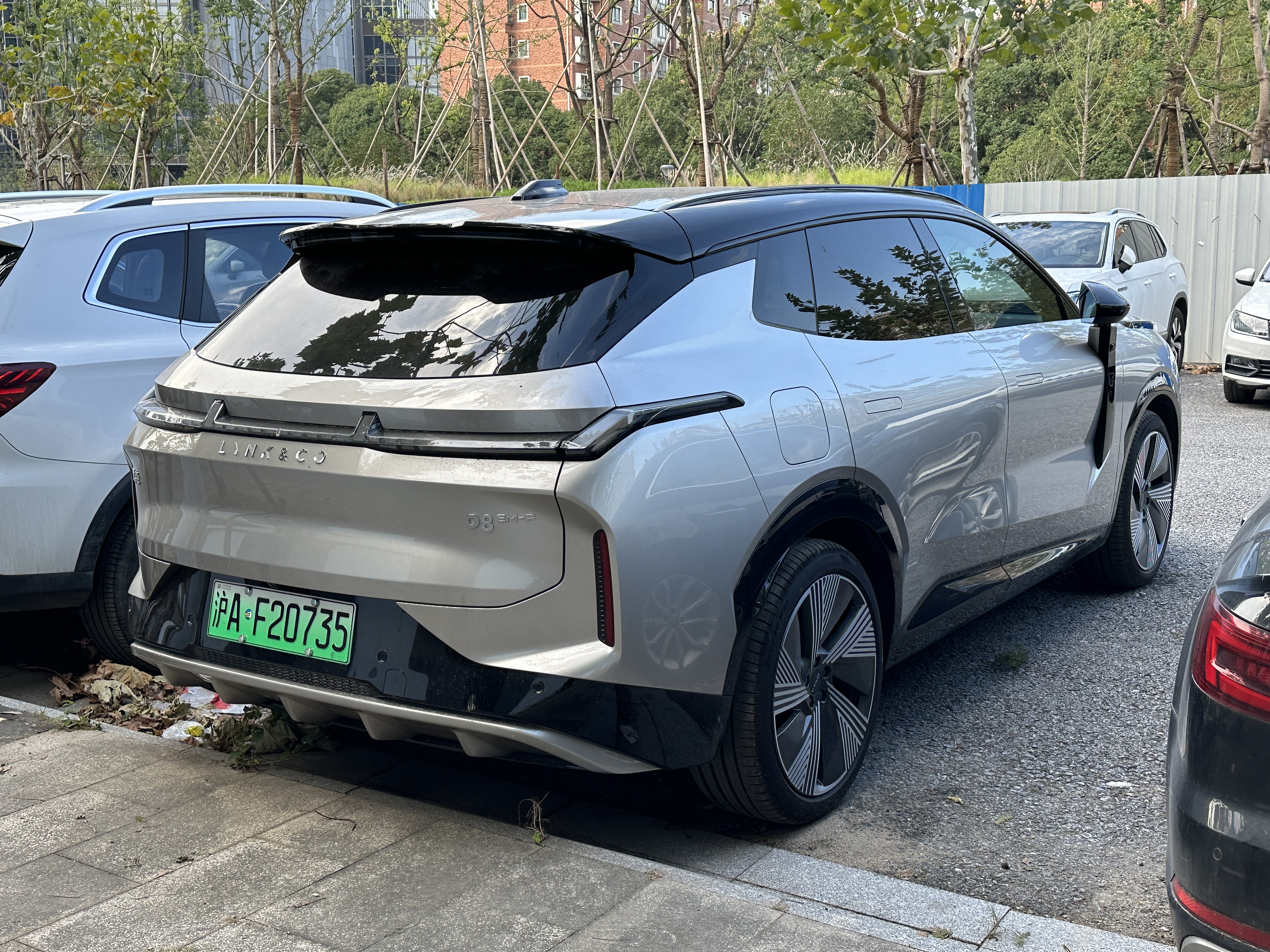
Rear view

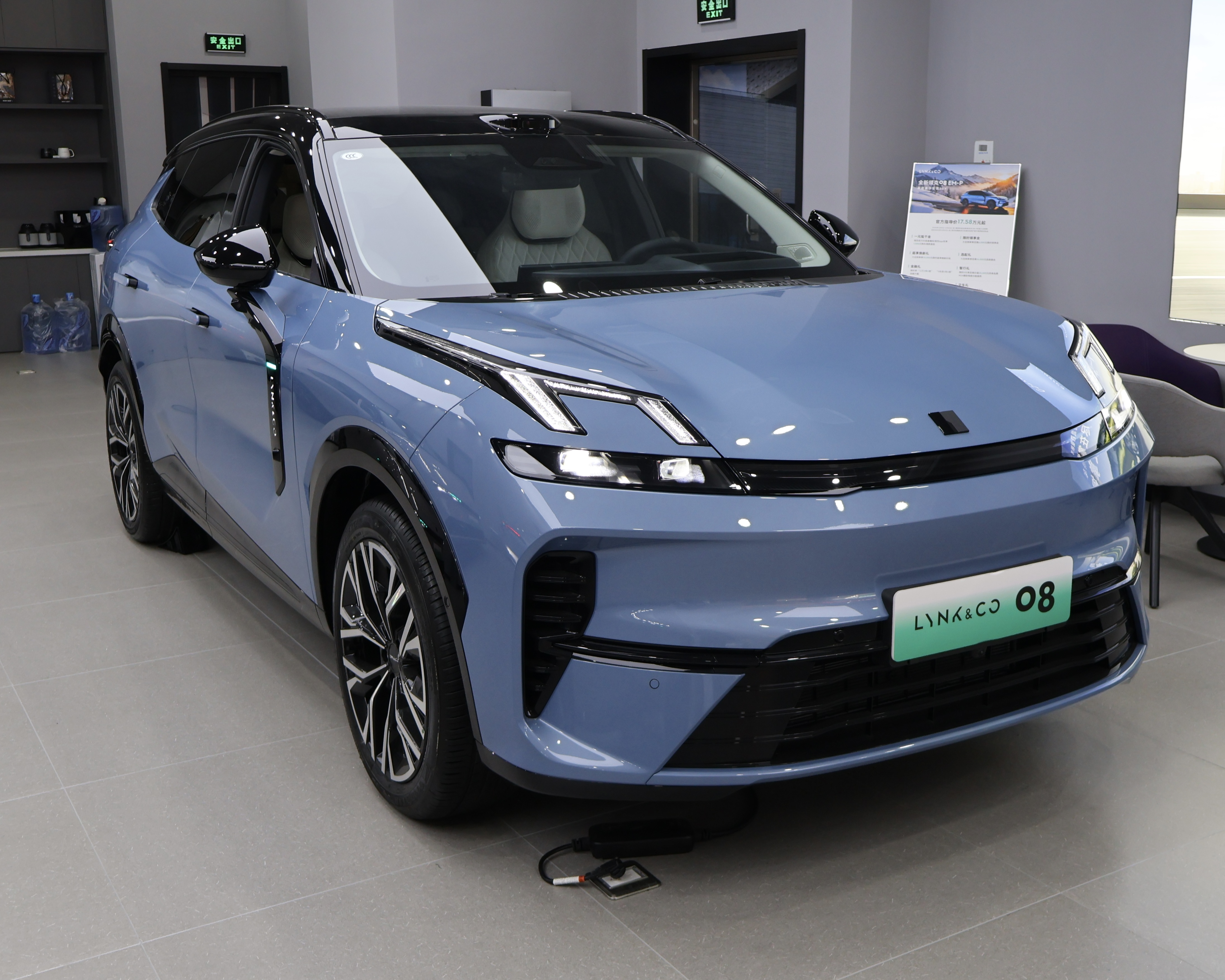
Lynk & Co 08 2026 (facelift)

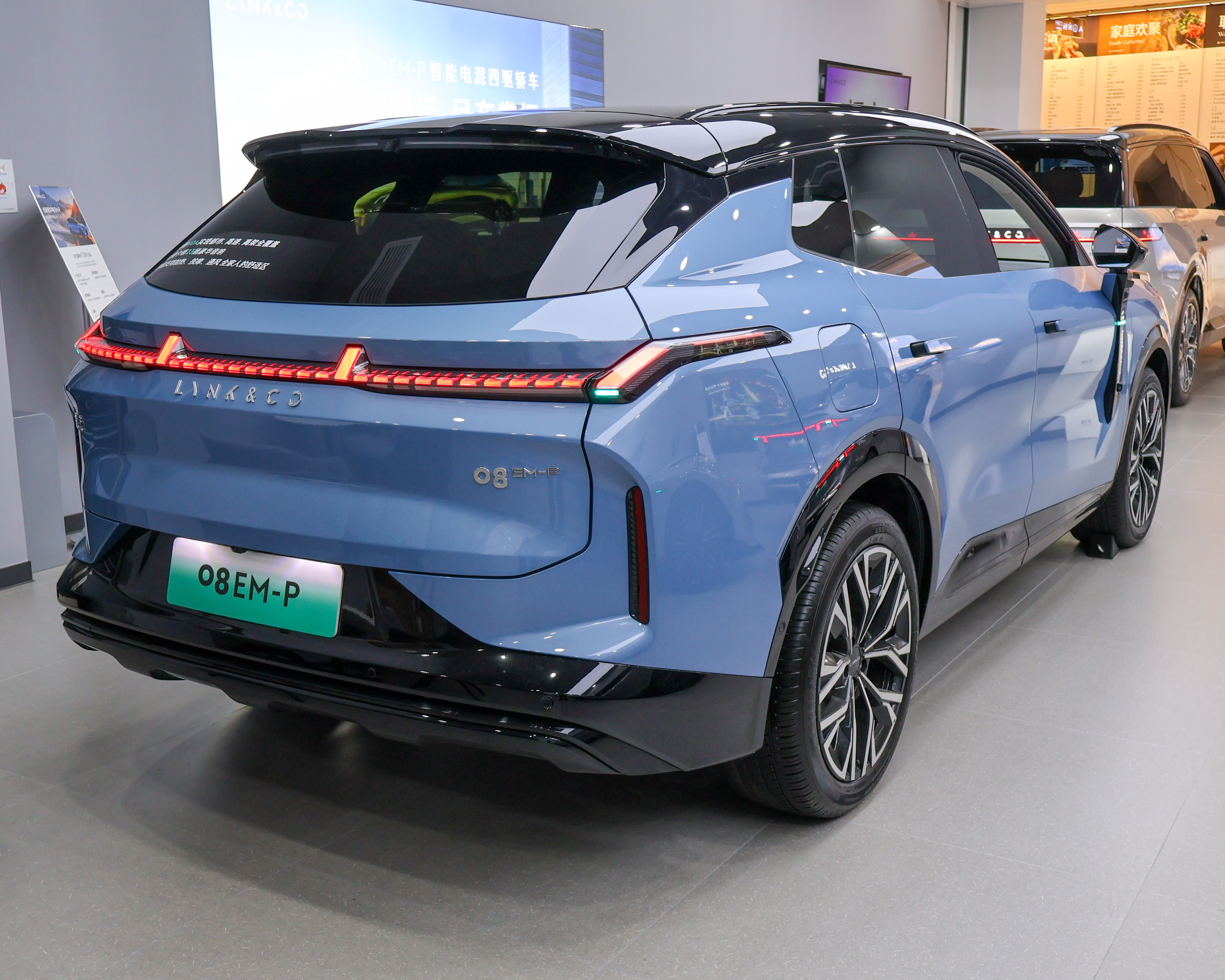
Rear view

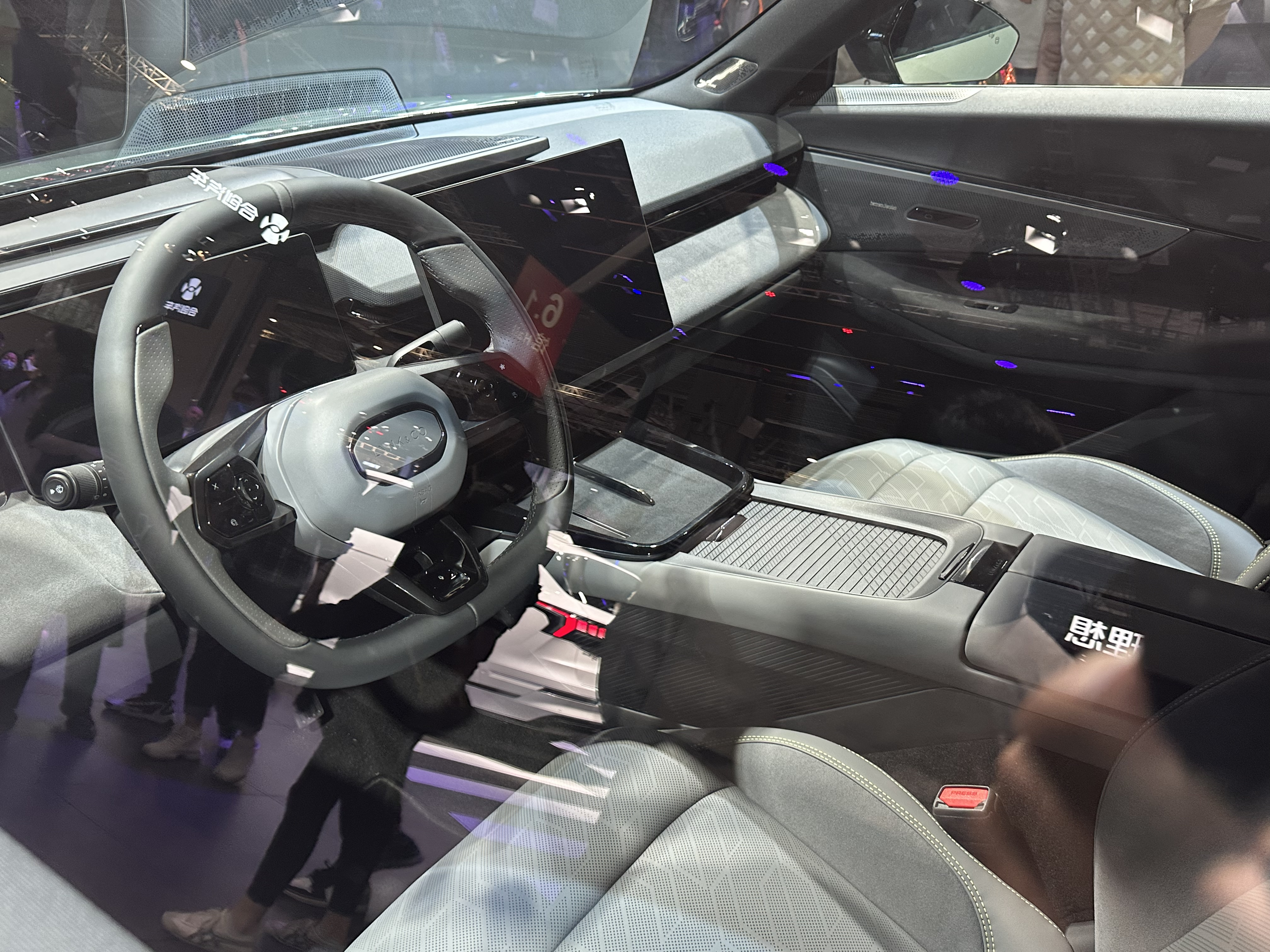
Interior

For the 2027 model year which launched on 5 November 2026 in China, the 08 receives a new Vibrant Orange exterior paint color and the smaller battery pack has been discontinued.

== Specifications ==
The 08 is based on the CMA (Compact Modular Architecture) platform, and it is the technical twin of the Volvo XC70, which is produced by Volvo Cars.

The EM-P powertrain of the Lynk & Co 08 is formed with a 1.5-litre turbocharged engine and two electric motors, with a third added to the rear axle for all-wheel drive. The total power output reaches 275 kW (374 PS; 369 hp) and 615 N⋅m (62.7 kg⋅m; 454 lb⋅ft) of torque for front-wheel drive and 431 kW (586 PS; 578 hp) and a peak torque of 905 N⋅m (92.3 kg⋅m; 667 lb⋅ft) for all-wheel drive. The Lynk & Co 08 is offered as a 4WD vehicle and can accelerate from 0 to 100 km/h (0 to 62 mph) within 4.6 seconds. The EM-P powertrain consists of a 3-gear series-parallel DHT transmission driving the front wheels. The standard battery pack has a capacity of 21.2 kWh and uses a mixture of NMC and LFP cells, and is supplied by CATL; it offers a WLTP electric range of 102 kilometres (63 mi). The long-range battery pack uses NMC cells and is either a 39.8 kWh pack supplied by SVOLT or 39.6 kWh supplied by CATL, and offers an electric range of up to 205 kilometres (127 mi). All variants recharge from 30–80% within 28 minutes.

In 2025, the 08 was updated with an updated 1.5-liter turbocharged petrol engine outputting 154 hp (115 kW; 156 PS) (161 hp (120 kW; 163 PS) gross) and 255 N⋅m (188 lb⋅ft) of torque, and a new front motor outputting 242 hp (180 kW; 245 PS) and 350 N⋅m (258 lb⋅ft) of torque, for a new total system output of 396 hp (295 kW; 401 PS) for front-wheel drive and 605 hp (451 kW; 613 PS) for all-wheel drive. It is paired with either a 28.3 kWh LFP pack supplied by Geely-associated Yaoning Jidian or a 38.2 kWh LFP pack supplied by Geely subsidiary VREMT, both of which can recharge from 30–80% within 15 minutes and provide WLTP electric range ratings of 130 and 185 kilometres (81 and 115 mi), respectively, and has up to 1,400 kilometres (870 mi) of combined range. The fuel consumption of the 1.5-litre turbocharged engine is 5.5 L/100 km (18.2 km/L; 51.4 mpg_{‑imp}; 42.8 mpg_{‑US}).

For the 2027 model year, the smaller battery pack has been dropped, leaving the 38.2 kWh pack as the sole option in China.

Specifications
Year	Battery		Engine	Motor		Total system		Electric range		30–80% charge	Top speed	Kerb weight
Year	Type	Weight	Engine	Front	Rear	Power	Torque	WLTP	CLTC	30–80% charge	Top speed	Kerb weight
2023–25	21.2 kWh mixed NMC+LFPCATL	189 kg (417 lb)	BHE15-BFZ 154 hp (115 kW; 156 PS)	160 kW TZ220WY035 PMSM	—	369 hp (275 kW; 374 PS)	615 N⋅m (454 lb⋅ft)	102 km (63 mi)	120 km (75 mi)	28 min	190 km/h (118 mph)	2,038 kg (4,493 lb)
2023–24	39.8 kWh NMC SVOLT	255 kg (562 lb)	BHE15-BFZ 154 hp (115 kW; 156 PS)	160 kW TZ220WY035 PMSM	—	369 hp (275 kW; 374 PS)	615 N⋅m (454 lb⋅ft)	205 km (127 mi)	245 km (152 mi)	28 min	190 km/h (118 mph)	2,100 kg (4,630 lb)
2024–25	39.6 kWh NMC CATL	249 kg (549 lb)	BHE15-BFZ 154 hp (115 kW; 156 PS)	160 kW TZ220WY035 PMSM	—	369 hp (275 kW; 374 PS)	615 N⋅m (454 lb⋅ft)	205 km (127 mi)	245 km (152 mi)	28 min	190 km/h (118 mph)	2,100 kg (4,630 lb)
2023–25	39.6 kWh NMC CATL	249 kg (549 lb)	BHE15-BFZ 154 hp (115 kW; 156 PS)	160 kW TZ220WY035 PMSM	156 kW TZ184XY030 PMSM	578 hp (431 kW; 586 PS)	905 N⋅m (667 lb⋅ft)	185 km (115 mi)	220 km (137 mi)	28 min	200 km/h (124 mph)	2,200 kg (4,850 lb)
2025–26	28.3 kWh LFP Yaoning Jidian	220 kg (485 lb)	BHE15-CFZ 154 hp (115 kW; 156 PS)	180 kW TZ220QY035 PMSM	—	396 hp (295 kW; 401 PS)	615 N⋅m (454 lb⋅ft)	130 km (81 mi)	160 km (99 mi)	14 min	190 km/h (118 mph)	2,050 kg (4,519 lb)
2026–present	38.2 kWh LFP VREMT	278 kg (613 lb)	BHE15-CFZ 154 hp (115 kW; 156 PS)	180 kW TZ220QY035 PMSM	—	396 hp (295 kW; 401 PS)	615 N⋅m (454 lb⋅ft)	185 km (115 mi)	230 km (143 mi)	15 min	190 km/h (118 mph)	2,100 kg (4,630 lb)
2025–present	38.2 kWh LFP VREMT	278 kg (613 lb)	BHE15-CFZ 154 hp (115 kW; 156 PS)	180 kW TZ220QY035 PMSM	156 kW TZ184QY102 PMSM	605 hp (451 kW; 613 PS)	905 N⋅m (667 lb⋅ft)	170 km (106 mi)	210 km (130 mi)	15 min	200 km/h (124 mph)	2,210 kg (4,872 lb)

=== Safety ===
Euro NCAP test results Lynk & Co 08 More (LHD) (2025)
Test	Points	%
Overall:	5 /5 stars	
Adult occupant:	36.3	90%
Child occupant:	42.7	87%
Pedestrian:	49.2	78%
Safety assist:	14.6	81%

== Sales ==
Year	China
2023	28,928
2024	72,243
2025	50,425
