= Compact Modular Architecture =

CMA platform
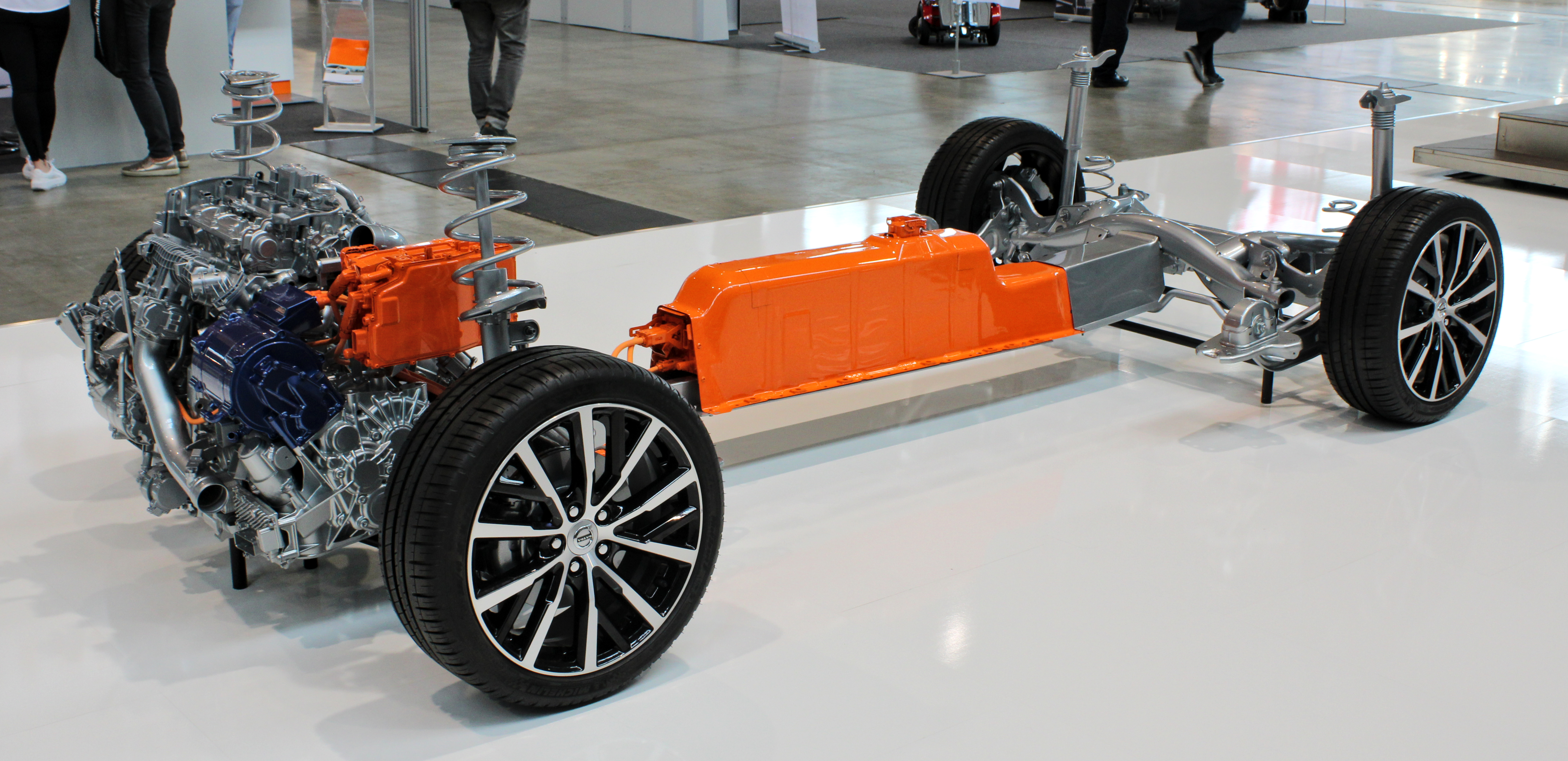

Overview
- Manufacturer: Volvo Cars; Geely
- Also called: P6; Volvo P6
- Production: 2017–present

Body and chassis
- Class: B-segment; C-segment
- Layout: ICE engine; Front-engine, front-wheel-drive; Front-engine, all-wheel-drive; Electric; Front-motor, front-wheel-drive; Rear-motor, rear-wheel-drive; Dual-motors, four-wheel-drive
- Related: SPA platform

Chronology
- Predecessor: Volvo: Volvo P1 platform; Geely: KC platform; NL platform
- Successor: Global Intelligent New Energy Architecture platform

The Compact Modular Architecture (CMA) is a global mid-size unibody automobile platform, developed by China Euro Vehicle Technology AB (CEVT), a Swedish subsidiary to Geely.

Development began in 2013 with the goal of producing a highly flexible vehicle platform. Only the distance between the centre of the front wheels and the pedal box is fixed, everything else can be configured to suit the intended vehicle design.

The platform debuted in August 2017 with the release of the Lynk & Co 01. The CMA platform configuration featured the four-cylinder 2 litre petrol and diesel engines, but also new 1.5-litre, three-cylinder engines with turbocharged and naturally aspirated variations. The platform will also accommodate a plug-in hybrid configuration capable of 180 bhp, supplemented by a 74 bhp electric motor.

== Applications ==
=== CMA ===
The Compact Modular Architecture platform is applied within Geely Group's Volvo, Lynk & Co, Geely Galaxy and Geely brand.

The first vehicle using CMA platform is Lynk & Co 01 in August 2017.

Volvo released its first fully electric car Polestar 2 based on the CMA platform in 2019.

Vehicles using platform (calendar years):

- Geely Boyue L III (FX11) (2022–present)
  - Geely Galaxy L7 (FX12) (2023–2026)
- Geely Boyue L IV (2025–present)
- Geely Xingrui (FS11) (2020–present)
- Geely Galaxy L6 (FS12) (2023–present)
- Geely Xingyue S/Tugella (FY11) (2019–present)
- Geely Xingyue L/Monjaro (KX11) (2021–present)
  - Renault Grand Koleos (AR1) (2024–present)
- Renault Filante (AR2) (2026–present)
- Lynk & Co 01 (CX11) (2017–present)
- Lynk & Co 02 (CC11) (2018–2023)
- Lynk & Co 03 (CS11) (2018–present)
- Lynk & Co 05 (DCY11) (2019–present)
- Polestar 2 (P319) (2020–present)
- Volvo XC40 (V316) (2017–present)
- Volvo C40 (V317) (2022–present)
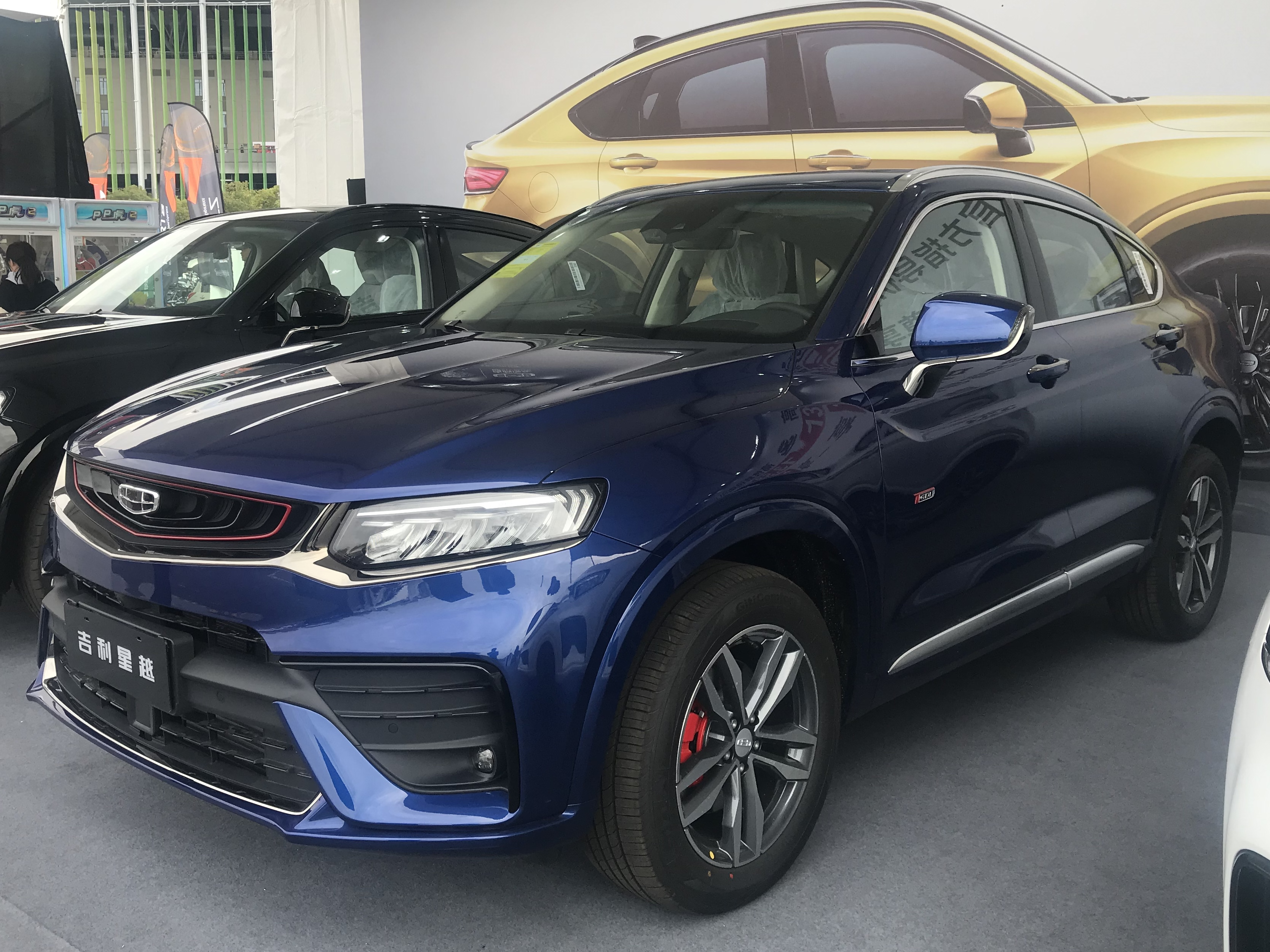
Geely Xingyue S

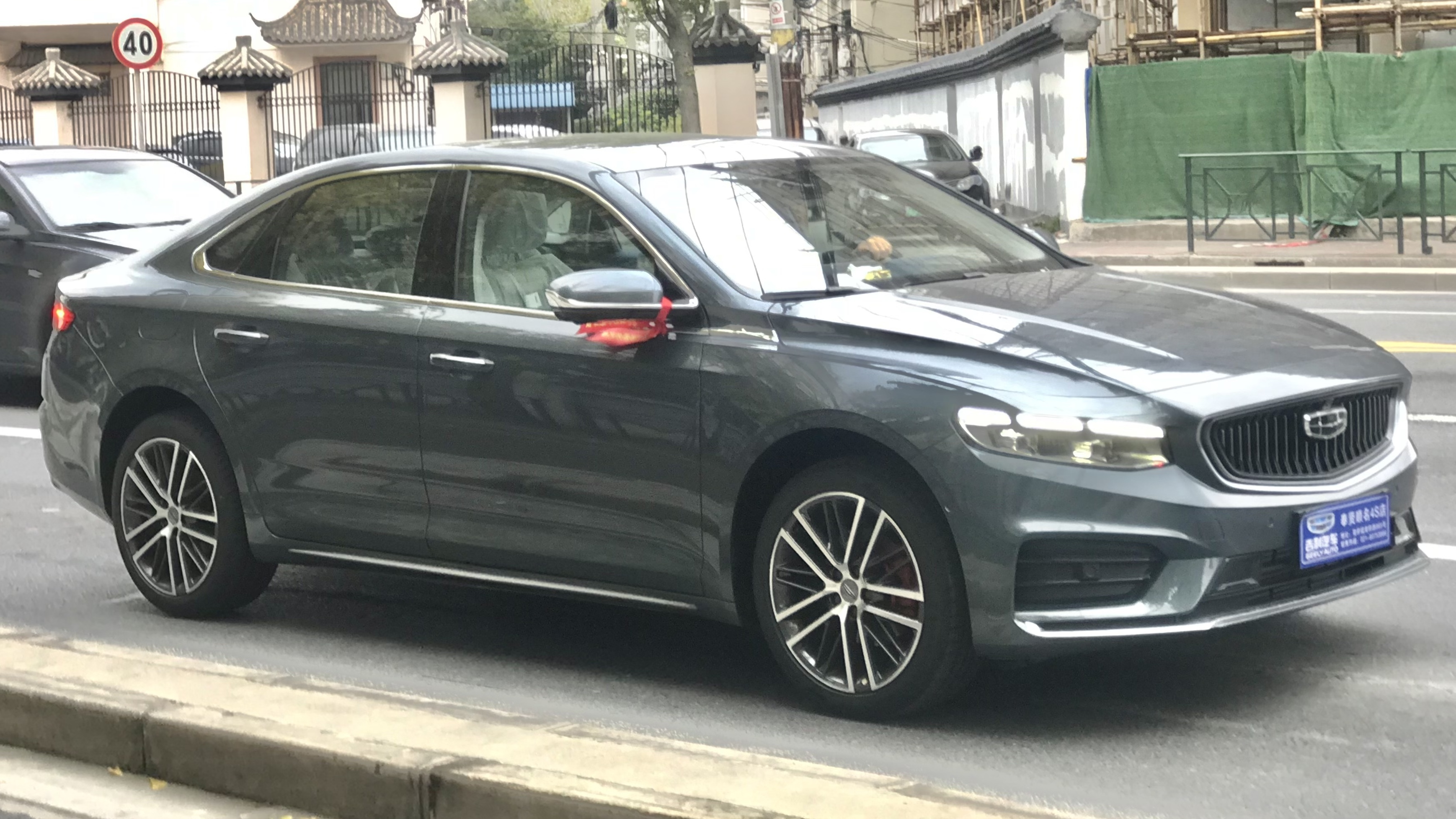
Geely Xingrui

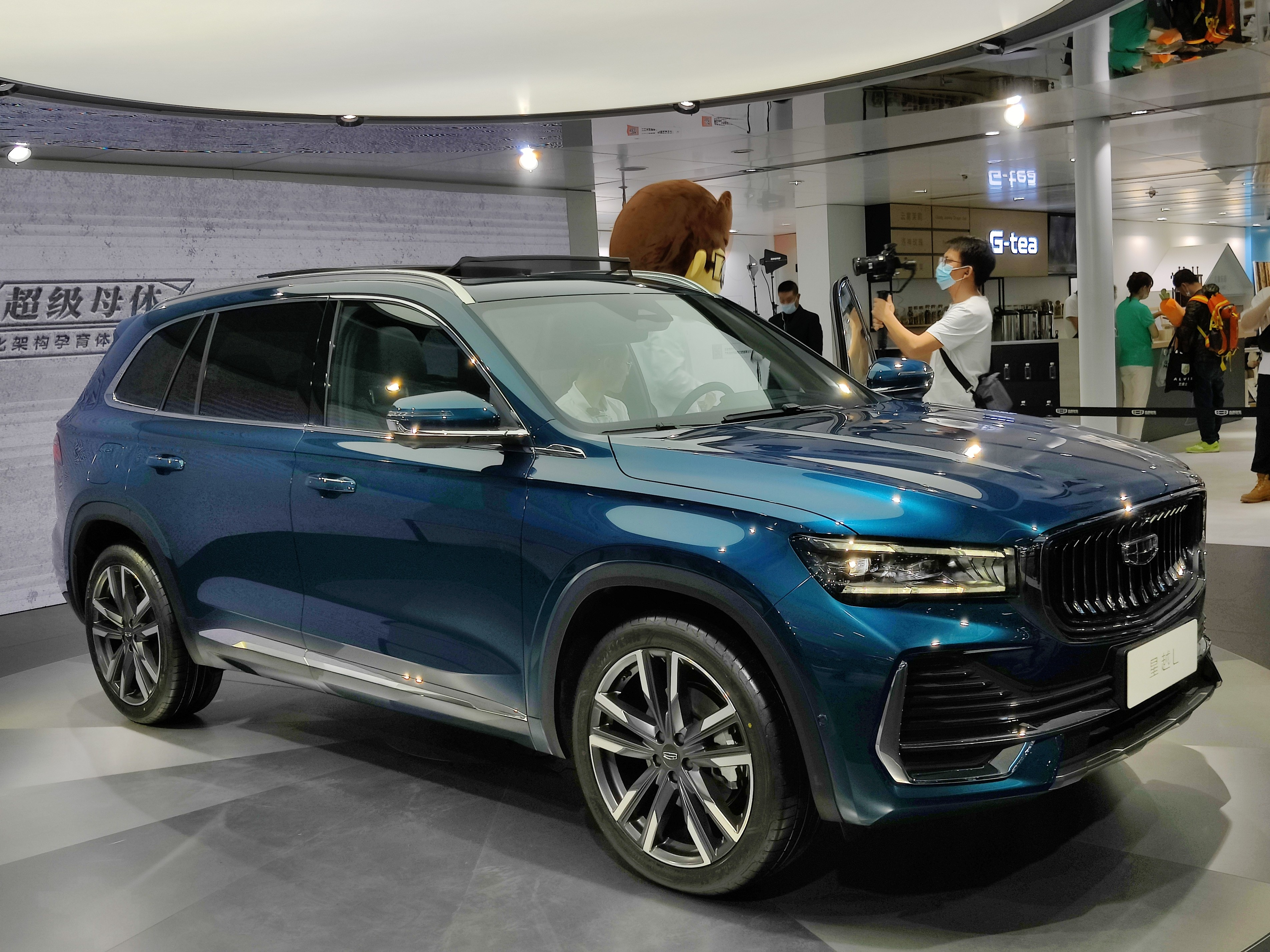
Geely Xingyue L

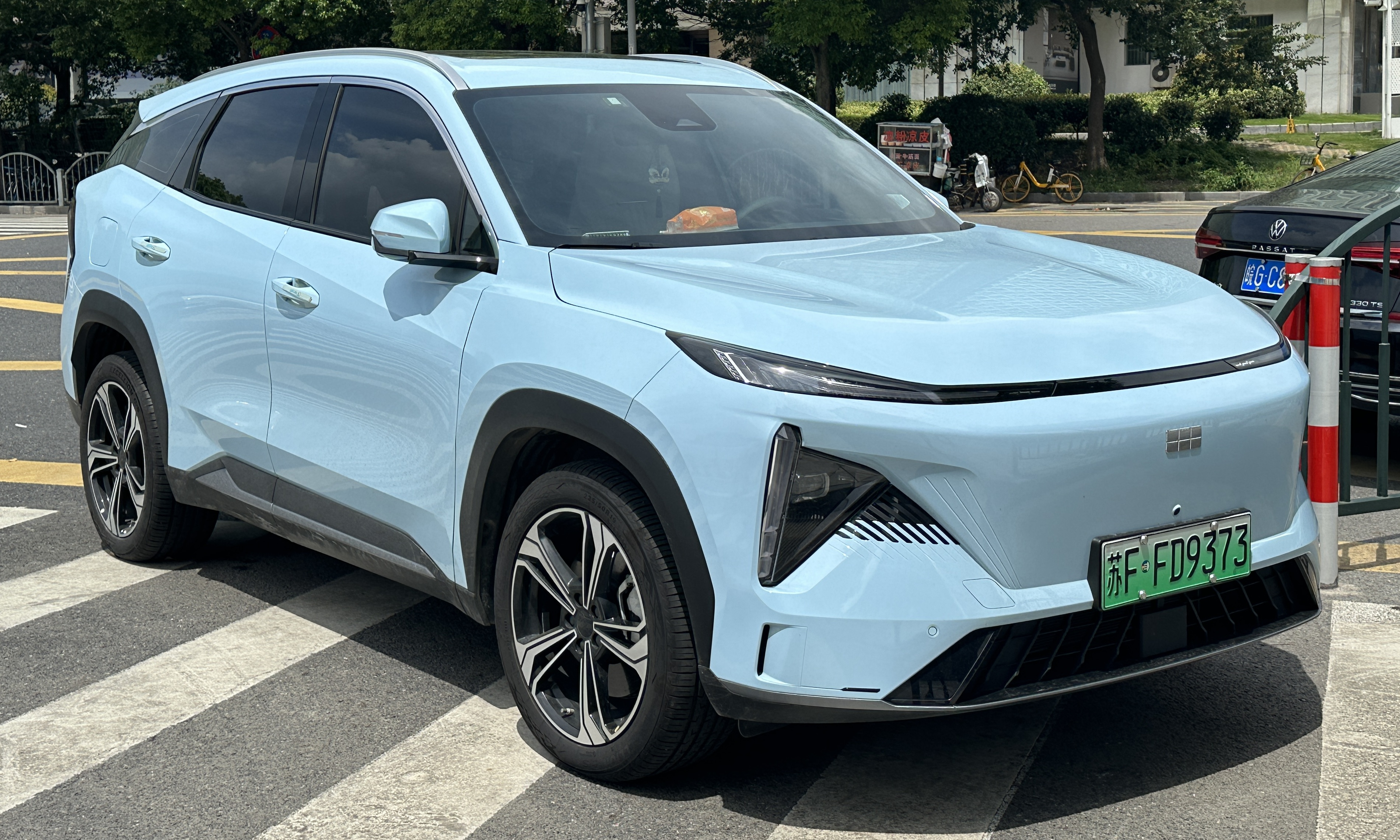
Geely Galaxy L7

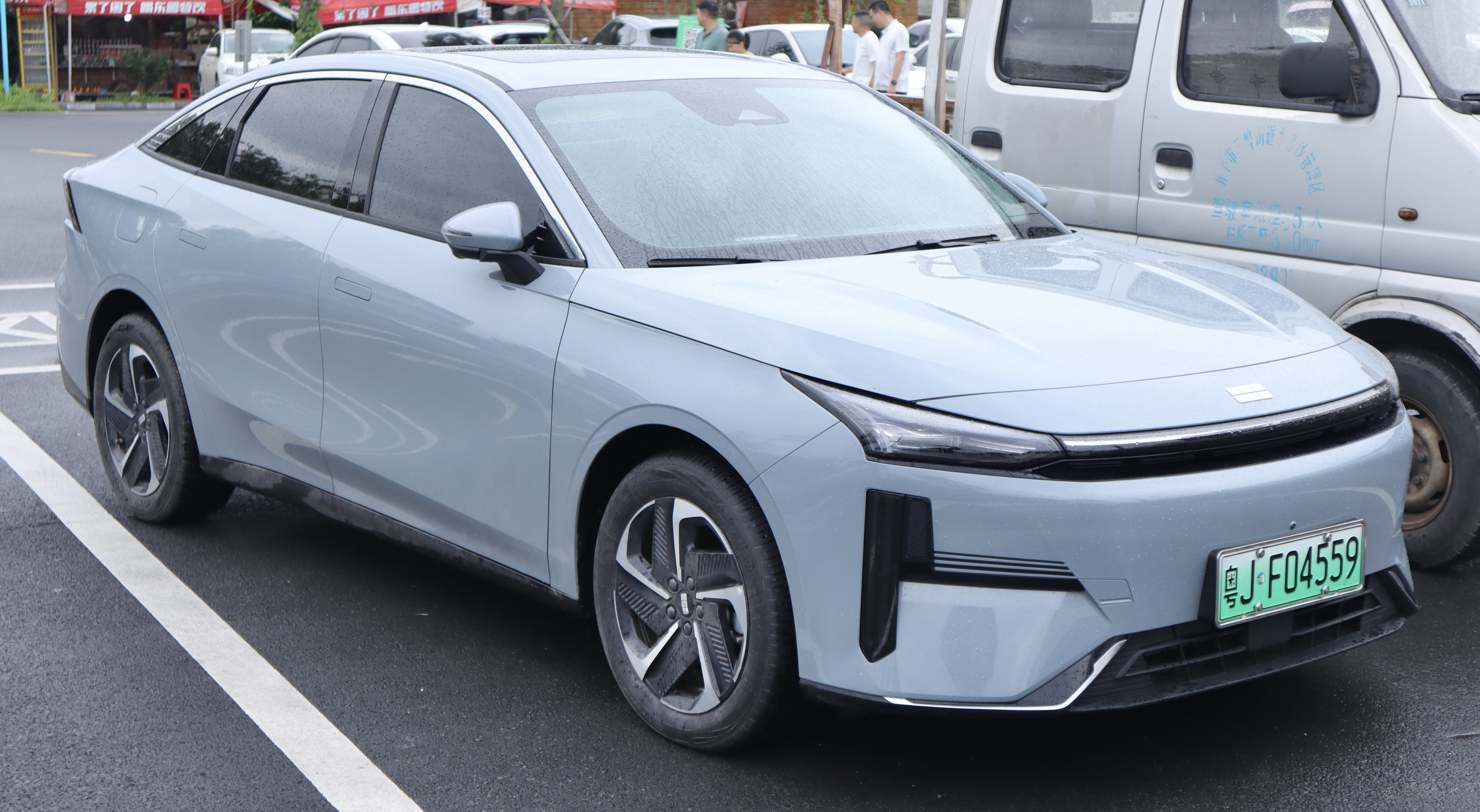
Geely Galaxy L6

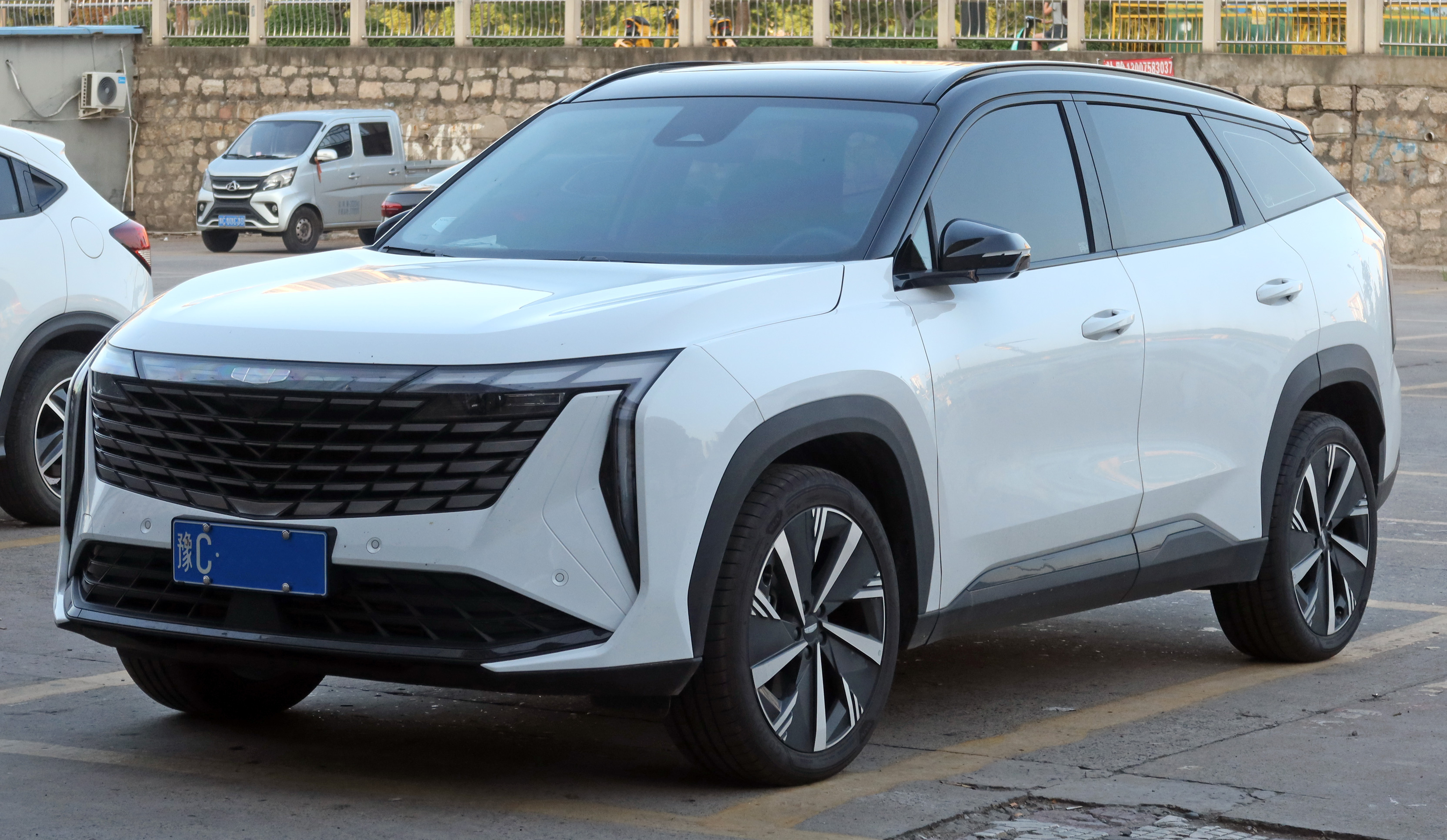
Geely Boyue L III

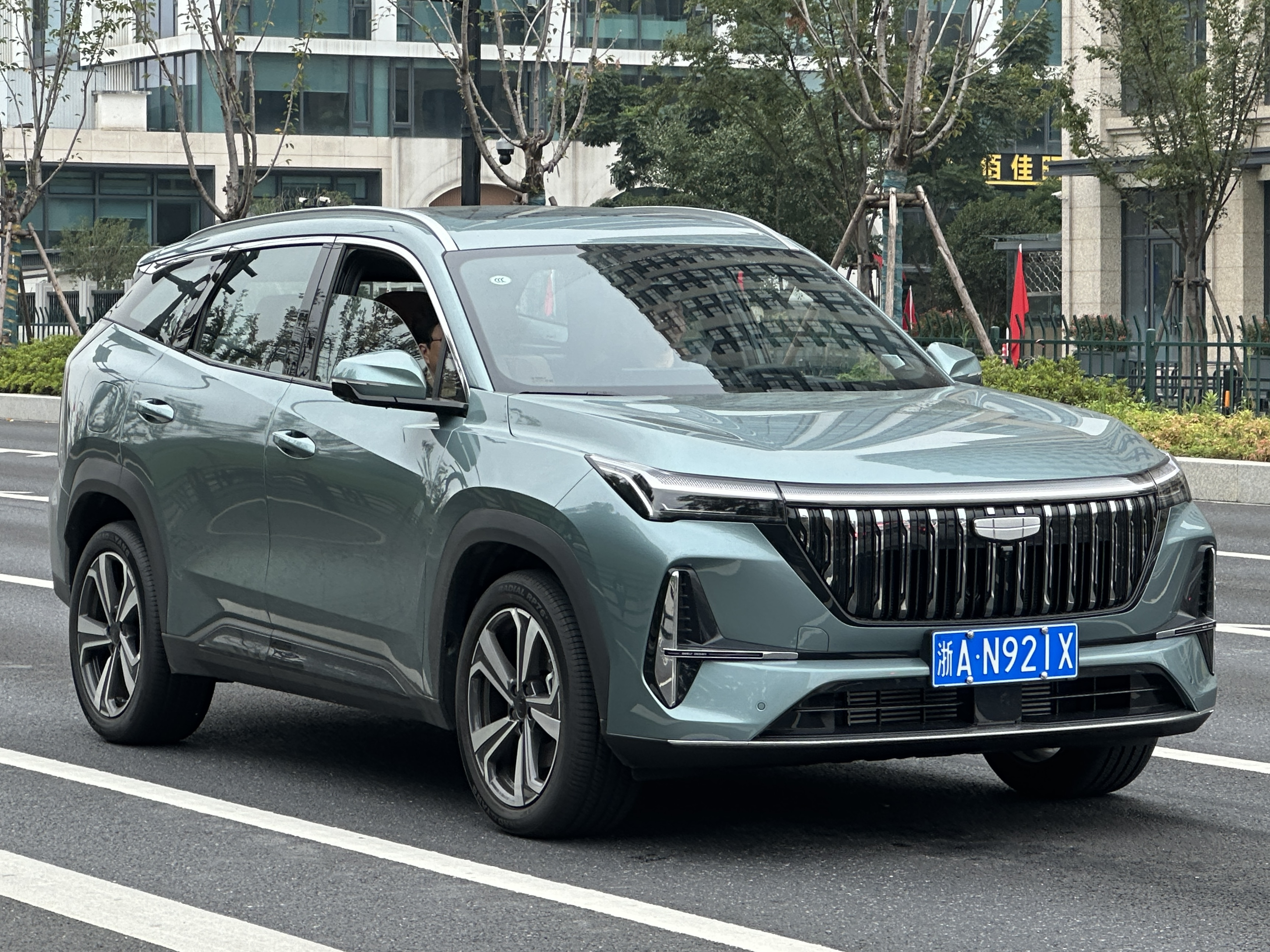
Geely Boyue L IV

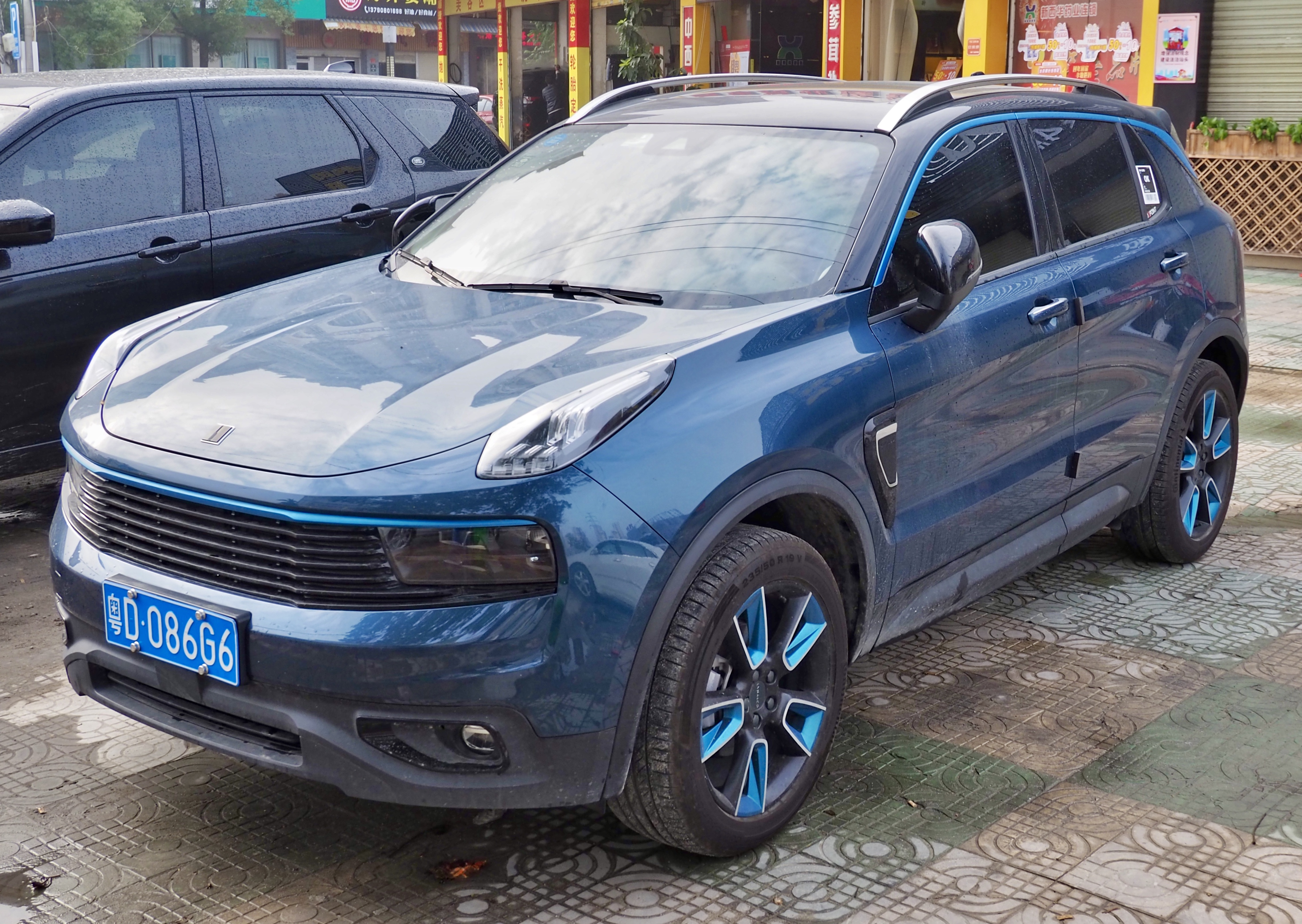
Lynk & Co 01

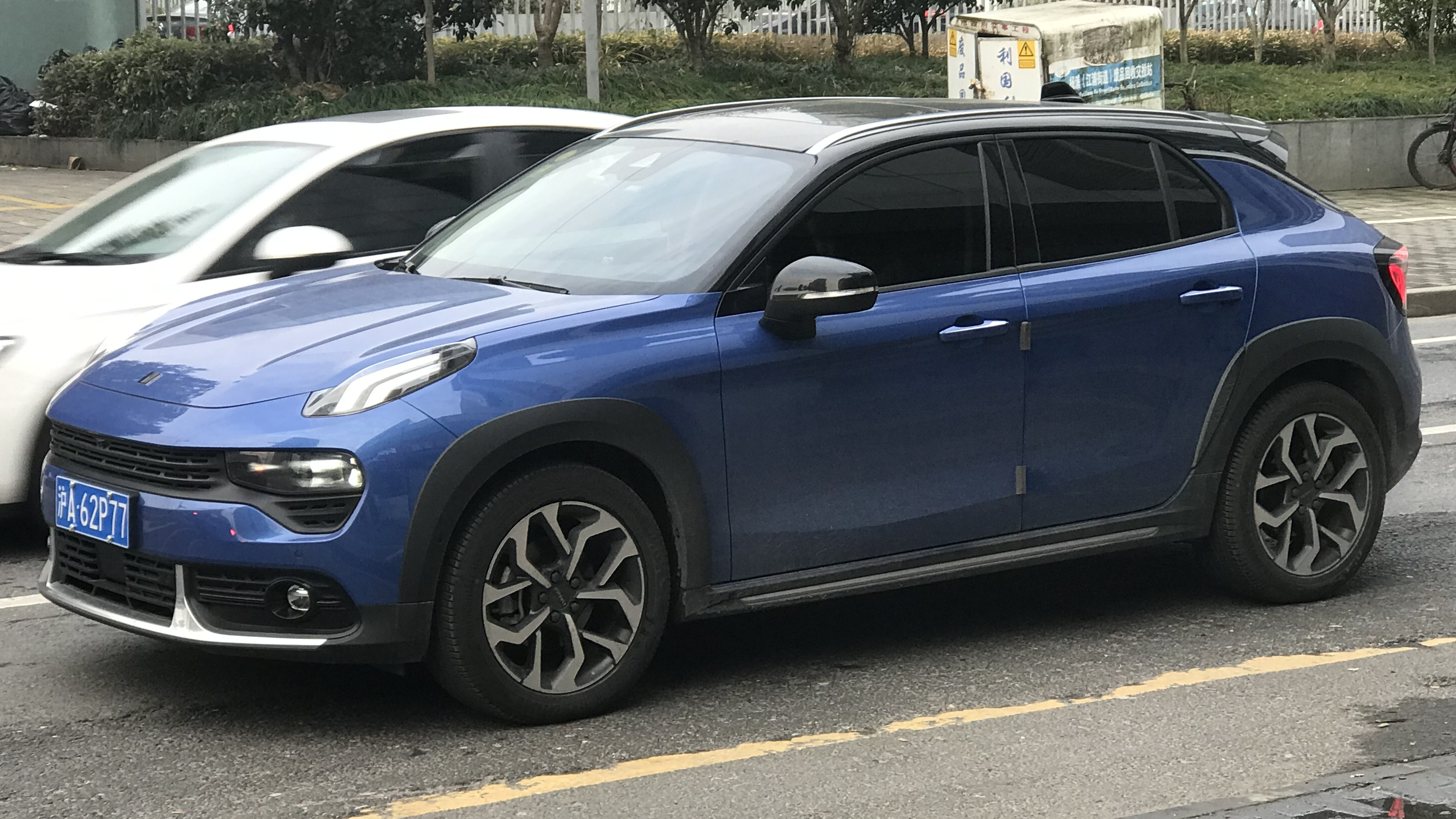
Lynk & Co 02

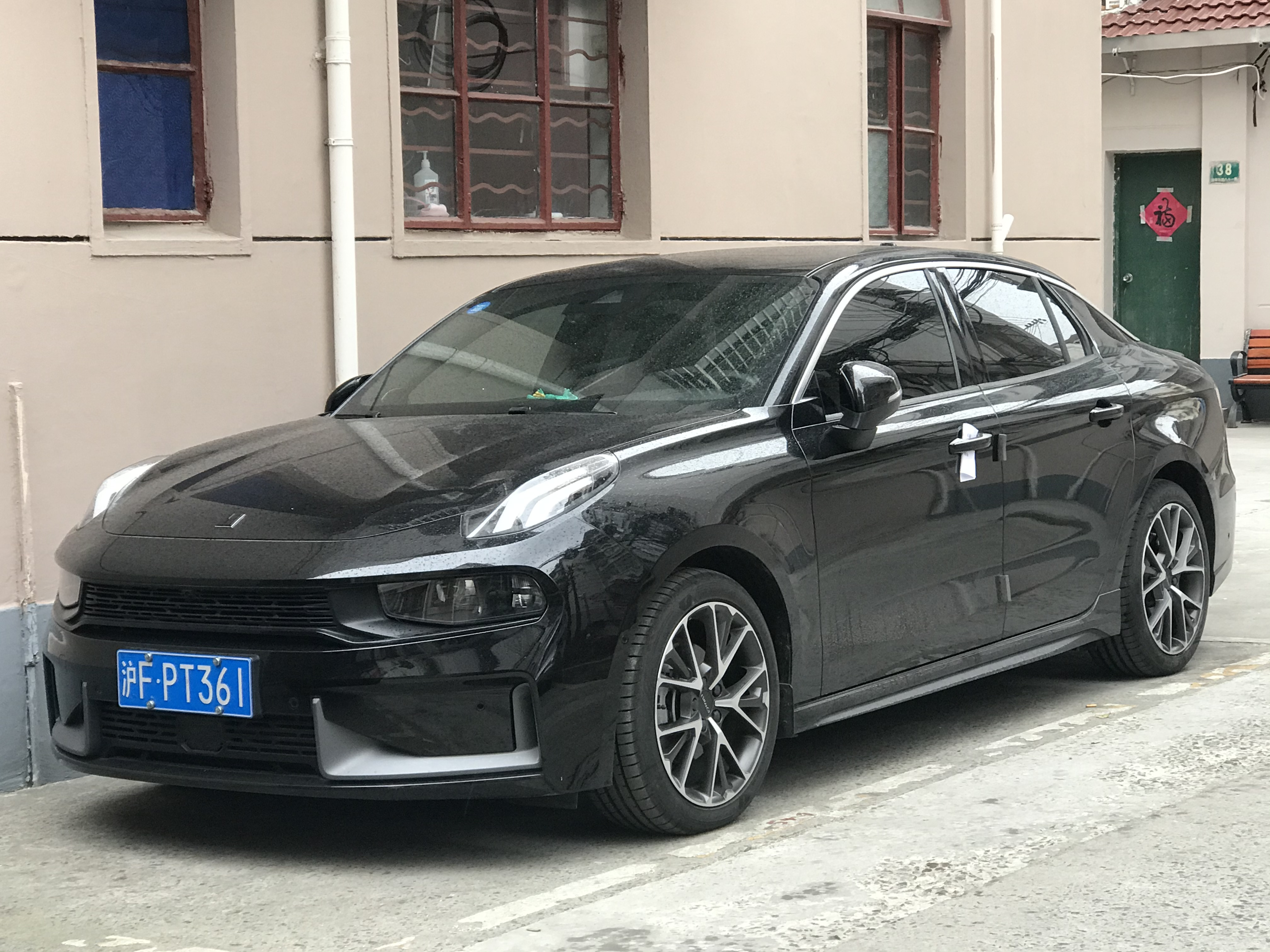
Lynk & Co 03

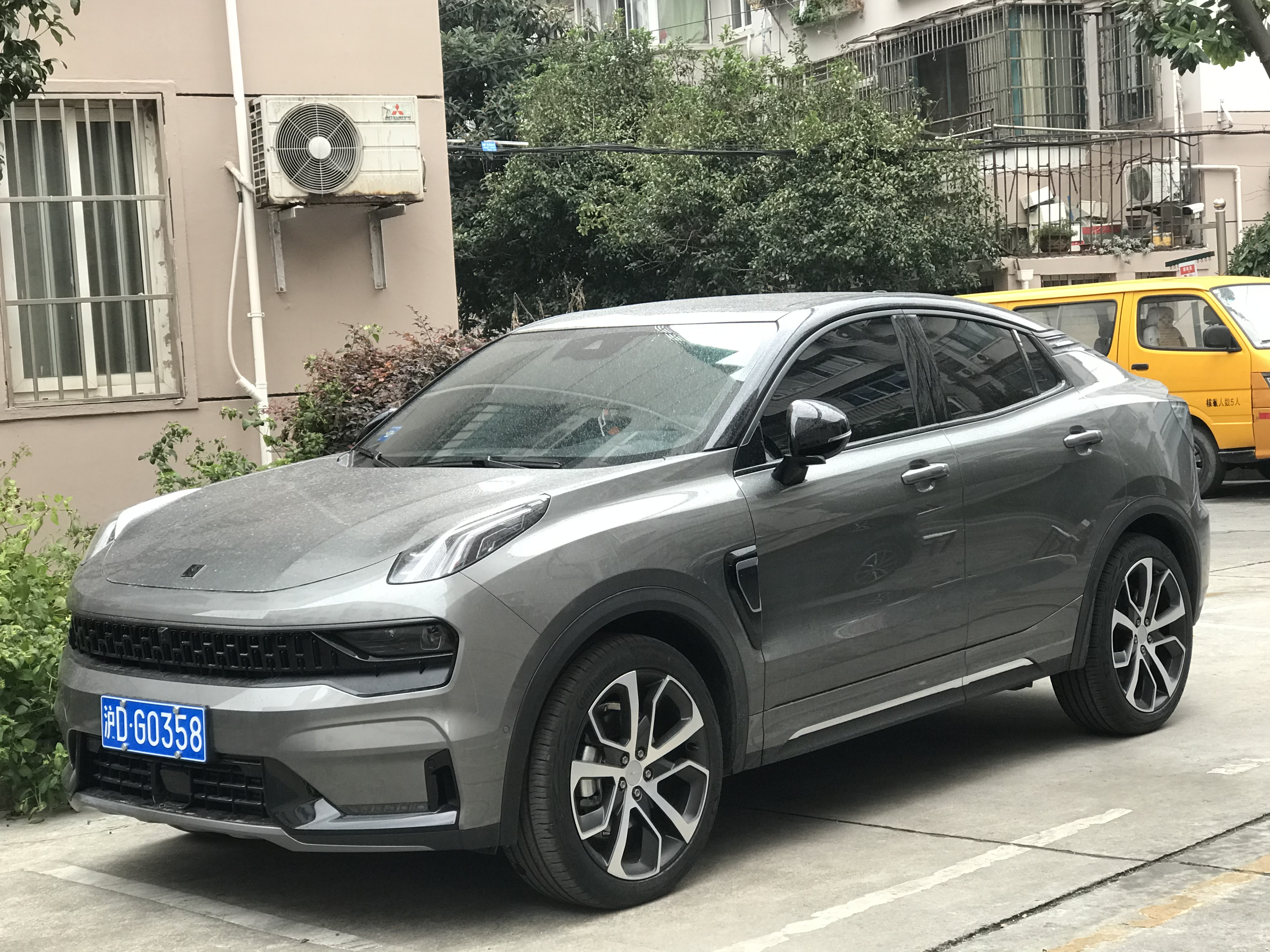
Lynk & Co 05

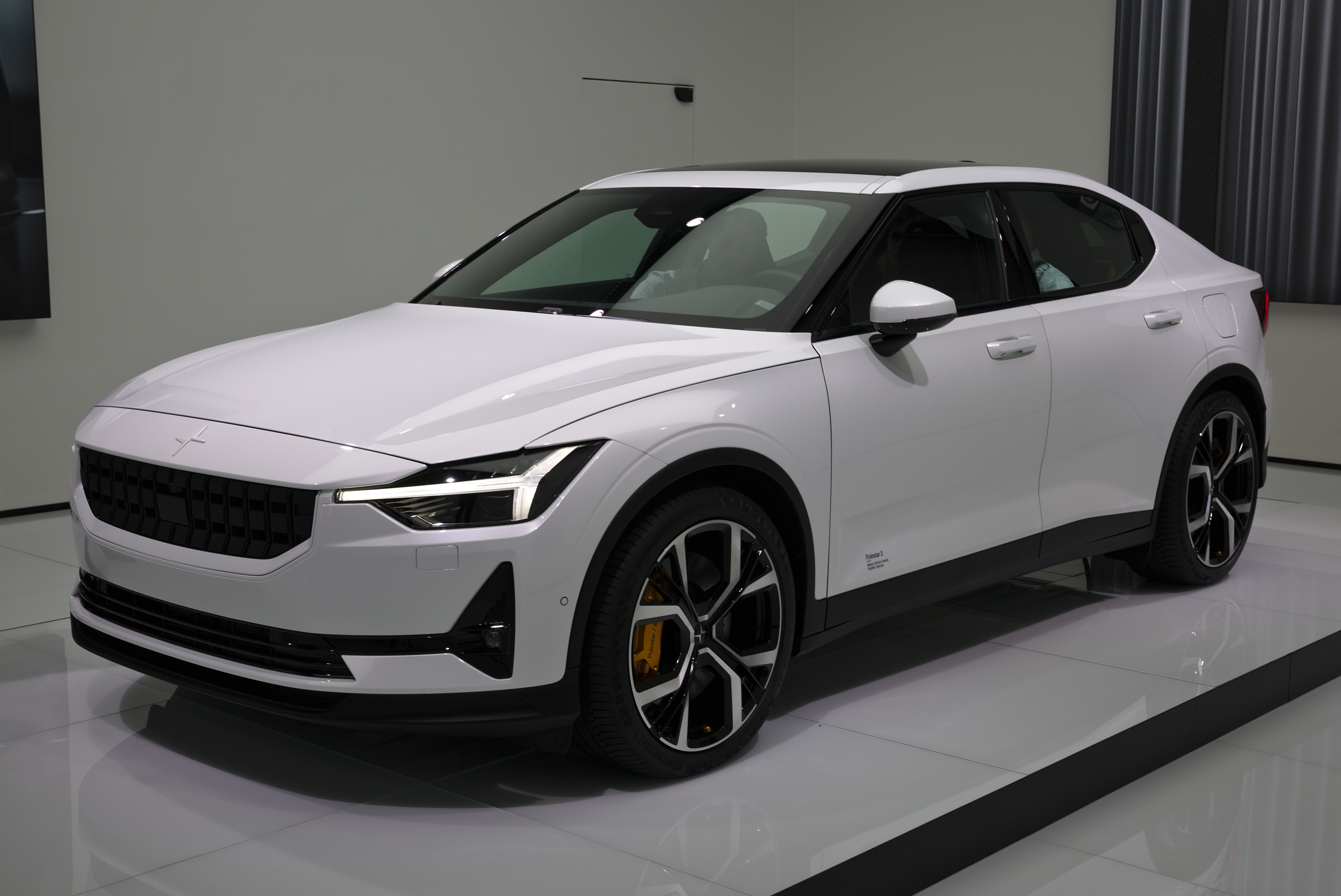
Polestar 2

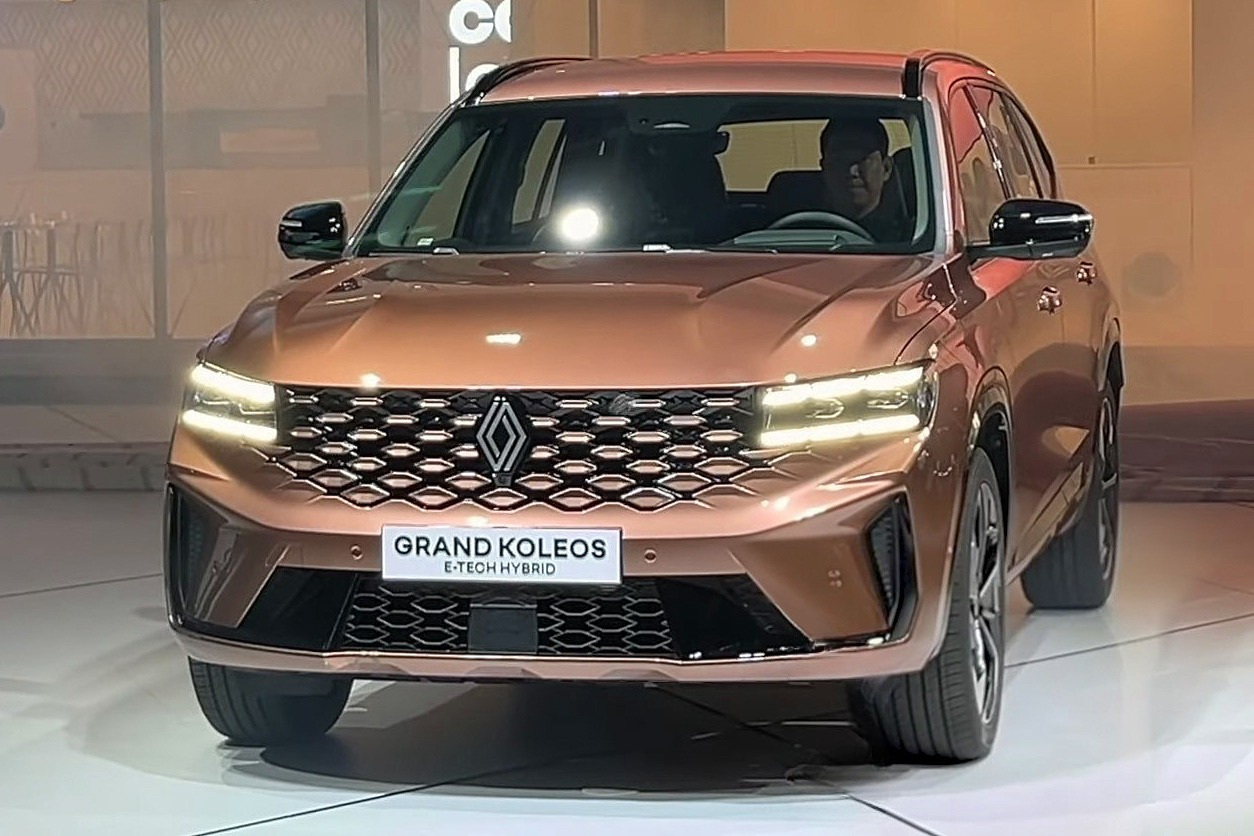
Renault Grand Koleos

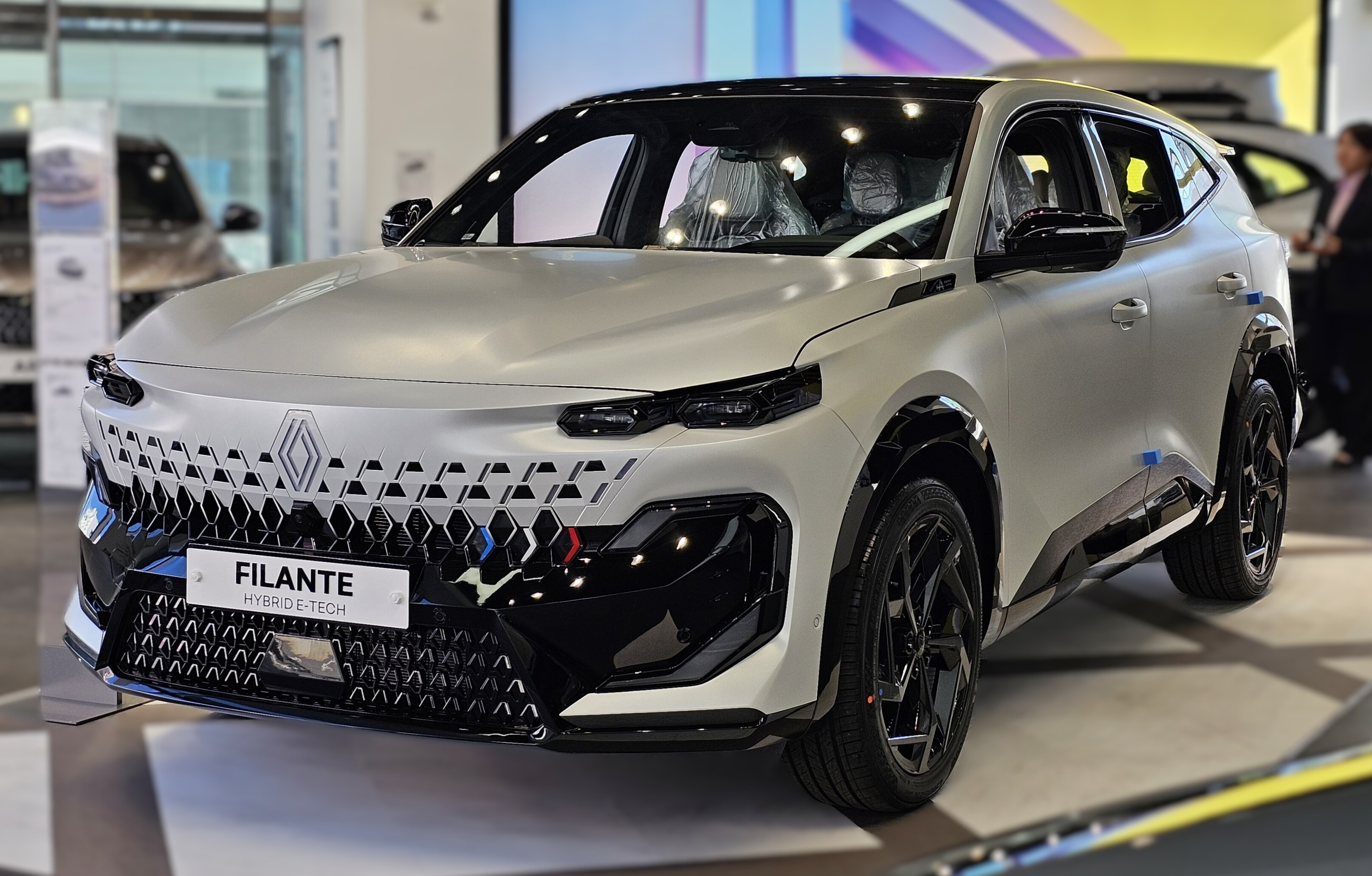
Renault Filante

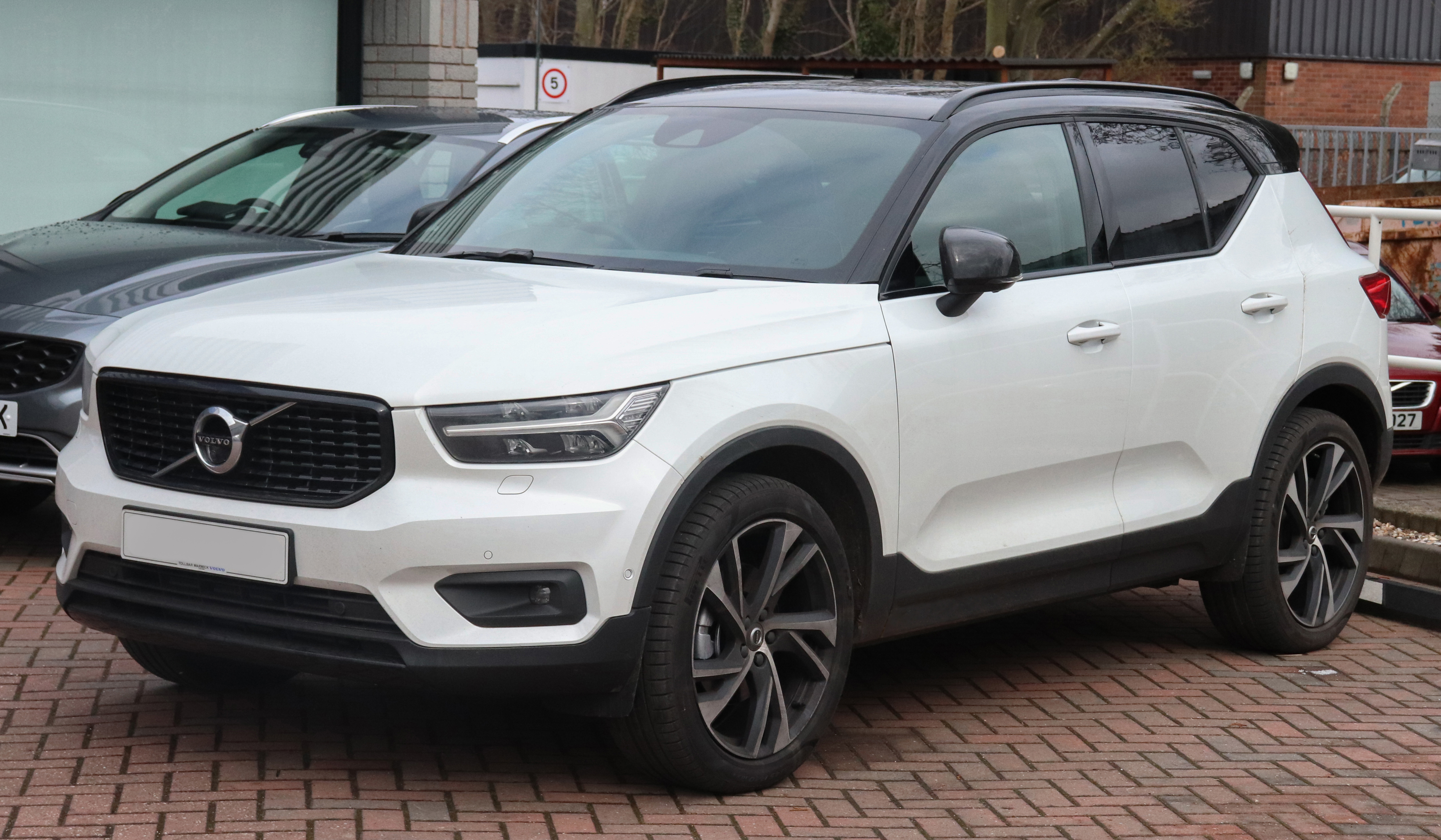
Volvo XC40

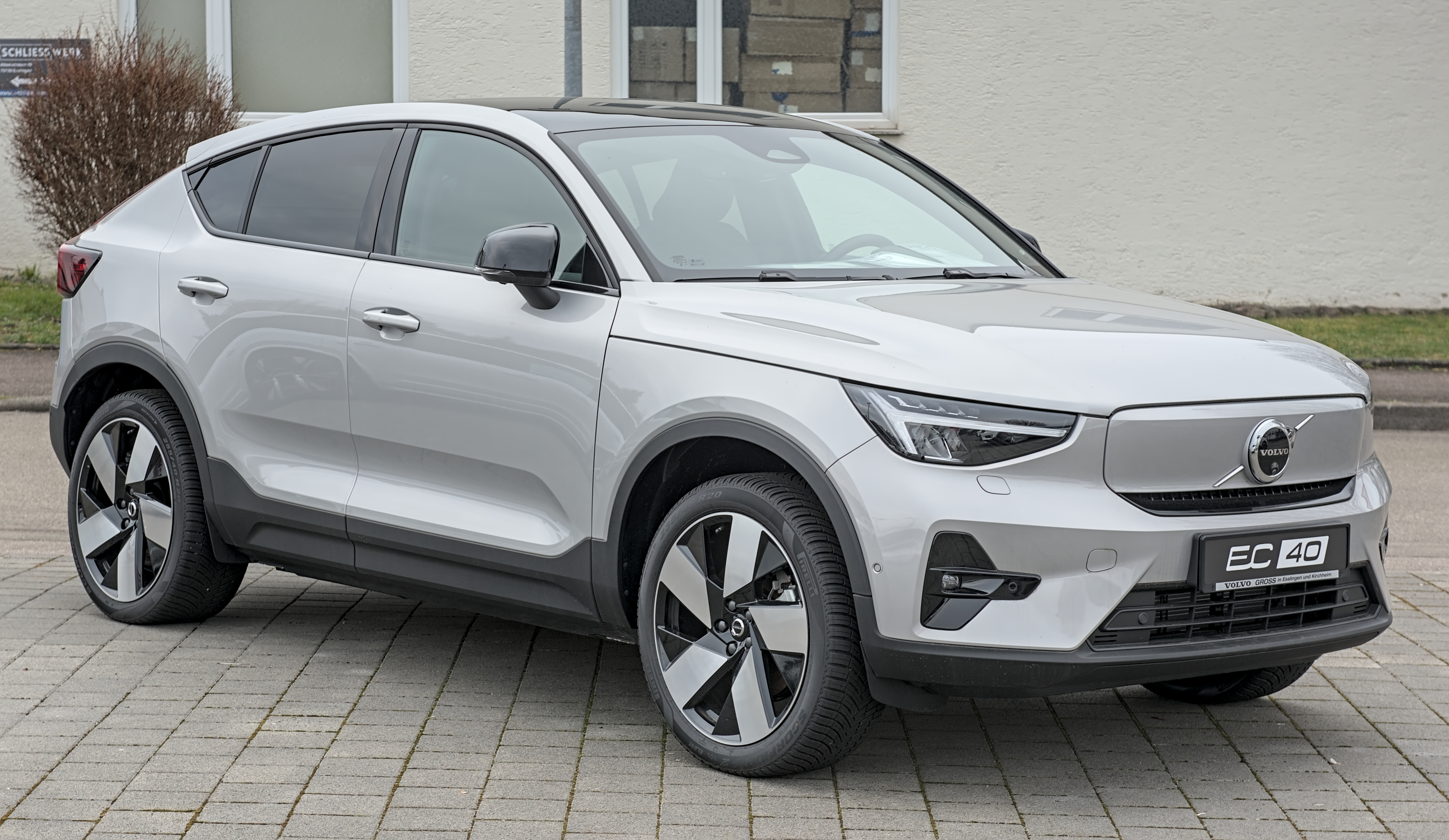
Volvo C40

=== CMA Evo (CMA 2.0)/ SMA (Scalable Modular Architecture) ===
In 2023, Geely announced the CMA Evo (Evolution) platform, the variant dedicated for PHEV, with its first vehicle Lynk & Co 08.

The CMA Evo platform demonstrates significantly enhanced safety performance compared to the original CMA. Through an integrated design combining the rear crash beam, energy absorption box, and rear longitudinal beam, the platform achieves significantly enhanced structural rigidity.

In 2025, Volvo announced the XC70 plug-in hybrid SUV developed based on Lynk & Co 08. The vehicle is marketed to be built on the Scalable Modular Architecture (SMA) platform, a re-branded CMA Evo platform of Volvo.

- Lynk & Co 08 (CX21) (2023–present)
- Lynk & Co 07 (CS21) (2024–present)
- Volvo XC70 (V446K) (2025–present)
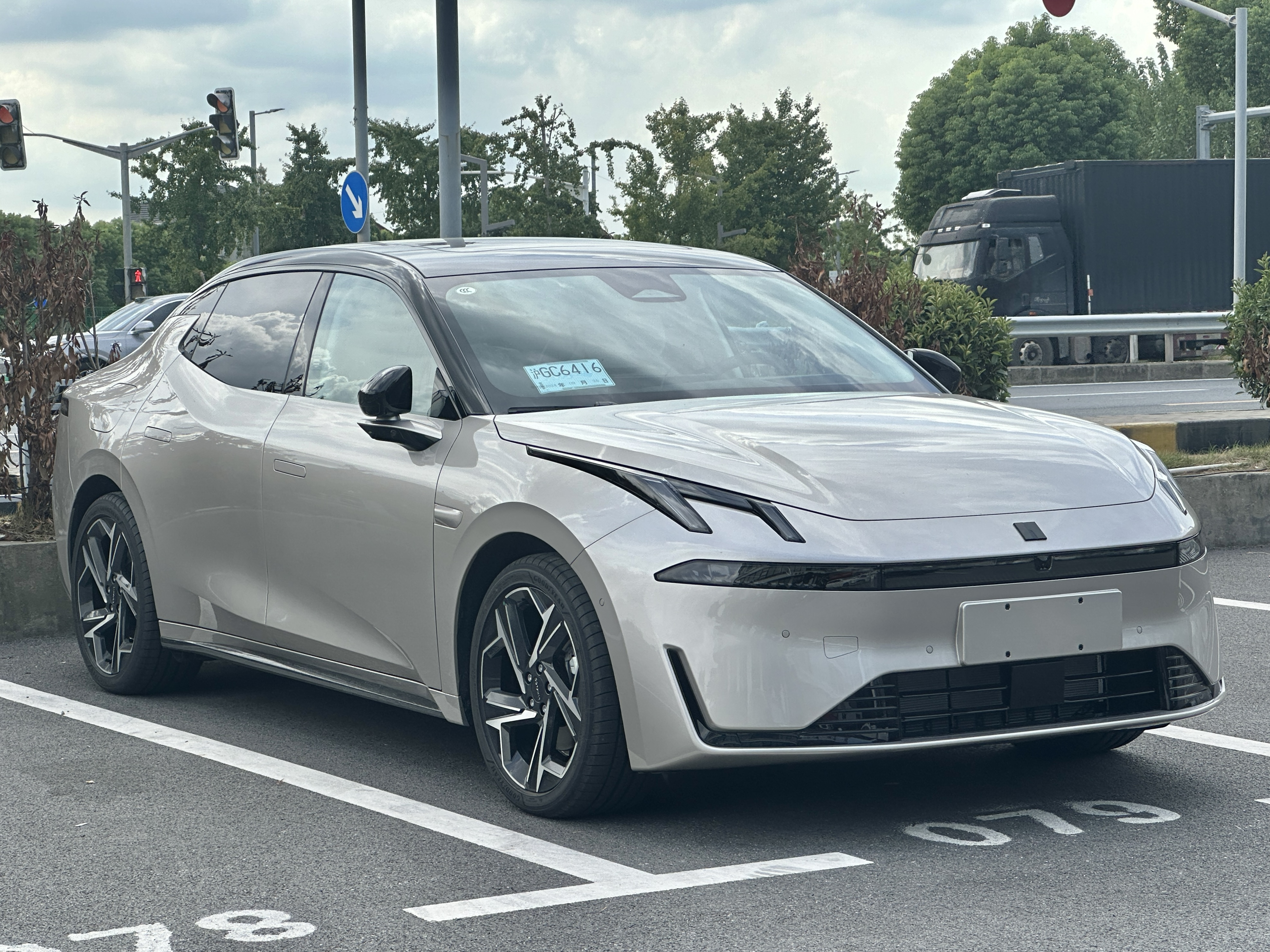
Lynk & Co 07

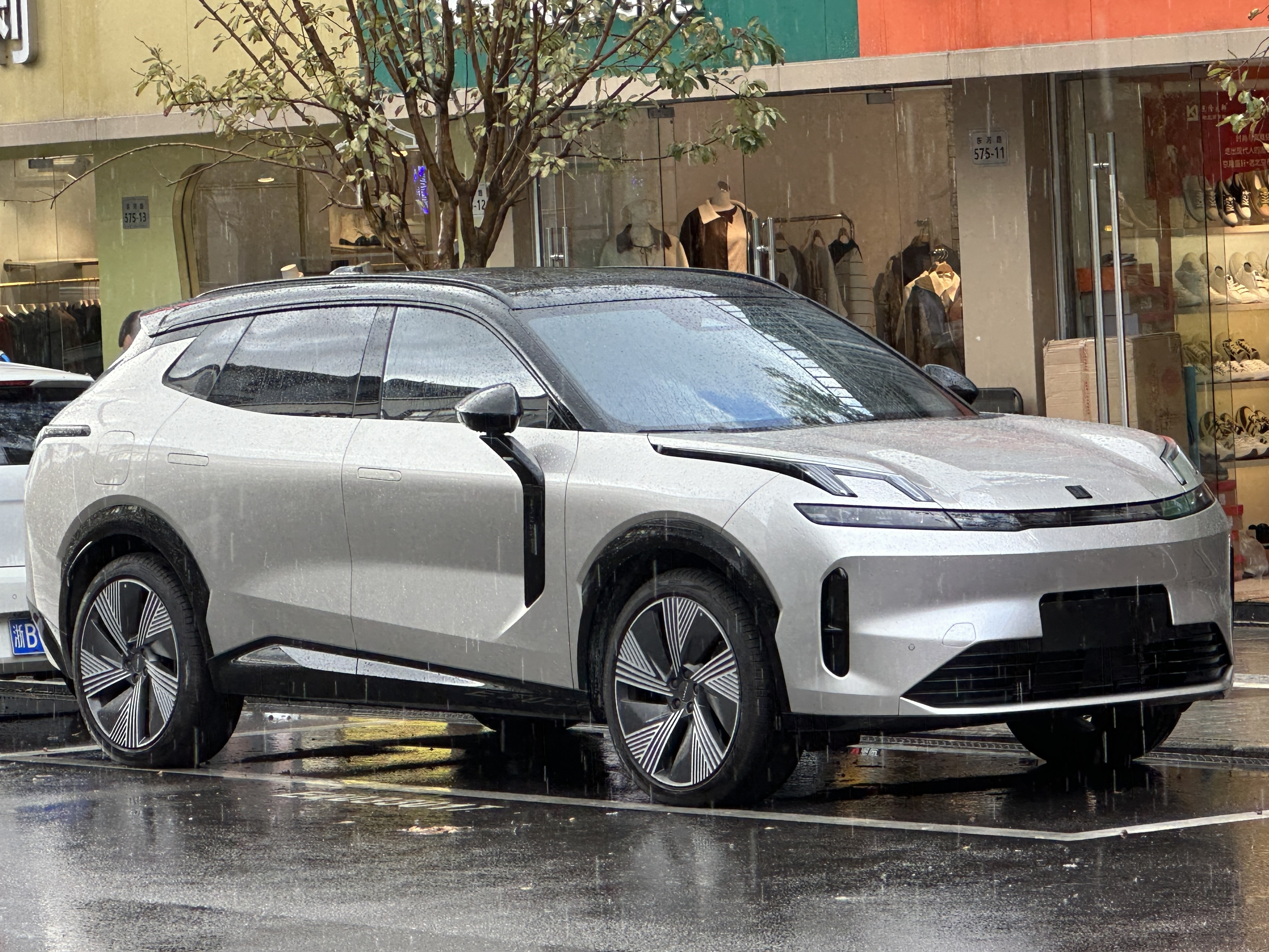
Lynk & Co 08

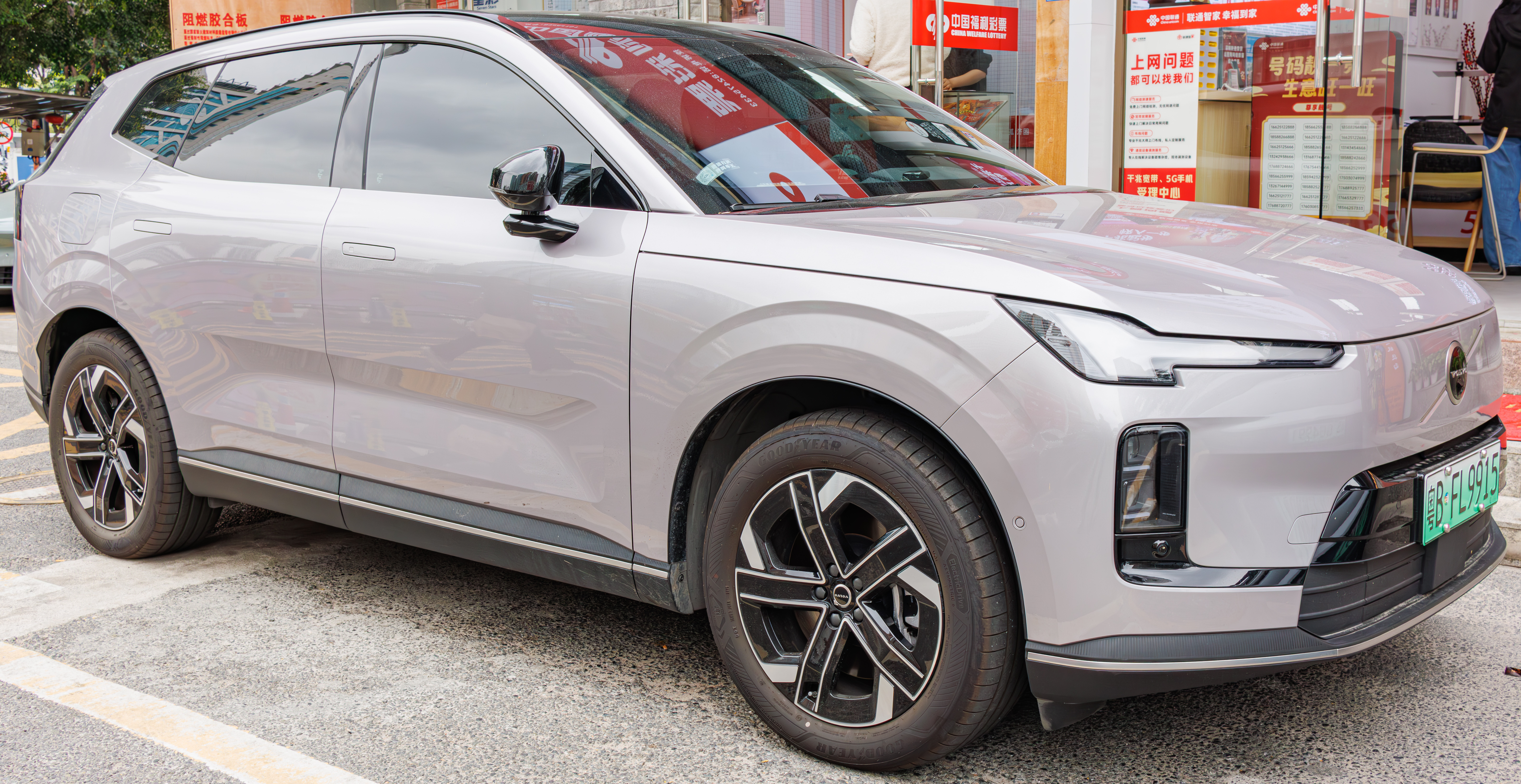
Volvo XC70

== See also ==
- SPA – Scalable Product Architecture platform
- SEA – Sustainable Experience Architecture platform
- GEA – Global Intelligent New Energy Architecture
- BMA – B-segment Modular Architecture platform
