= Lynk & Co The Next Day =

Battery electric hatchback

Lynk & Co Next Day Concept
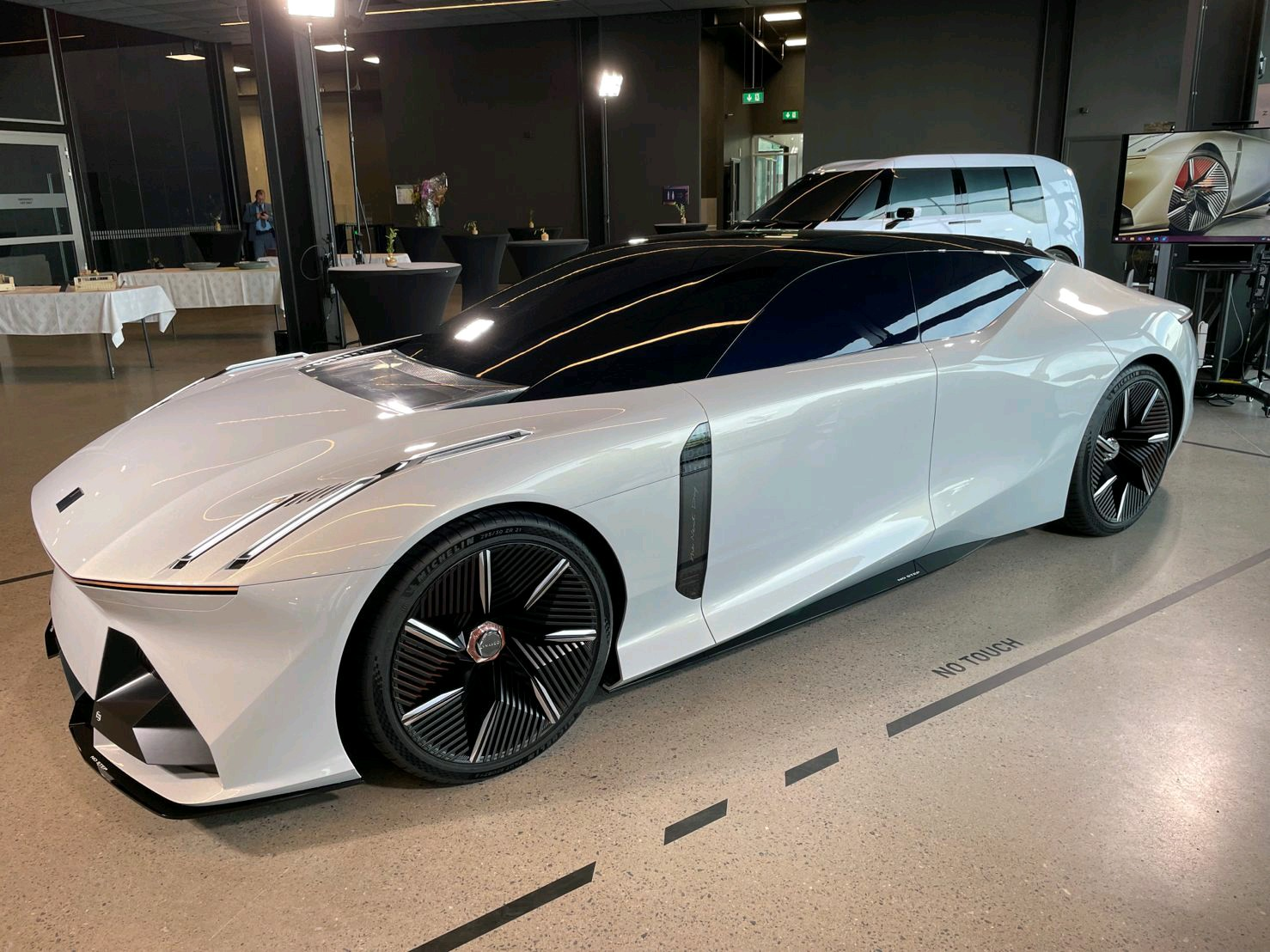

Overview
- Manufacturer: Lynk & Co (Geely)
- Designer: David Beasley

Body and chassis
- Class: Grand tourer
- Body style: 4-door full size sedan

Powertrain
- Battery: Lithium-ion

The Lynk & Co Next Day Concept is a four-door four-seater concept car developed by Lynk & Co and announced in 2022. The car was meant to preview manufacturer's future design language. Specifications and production data were not announced and there is contradictory information whether this is a battery electric or a hybrid electric car.
