= Lynk & Co 05 =

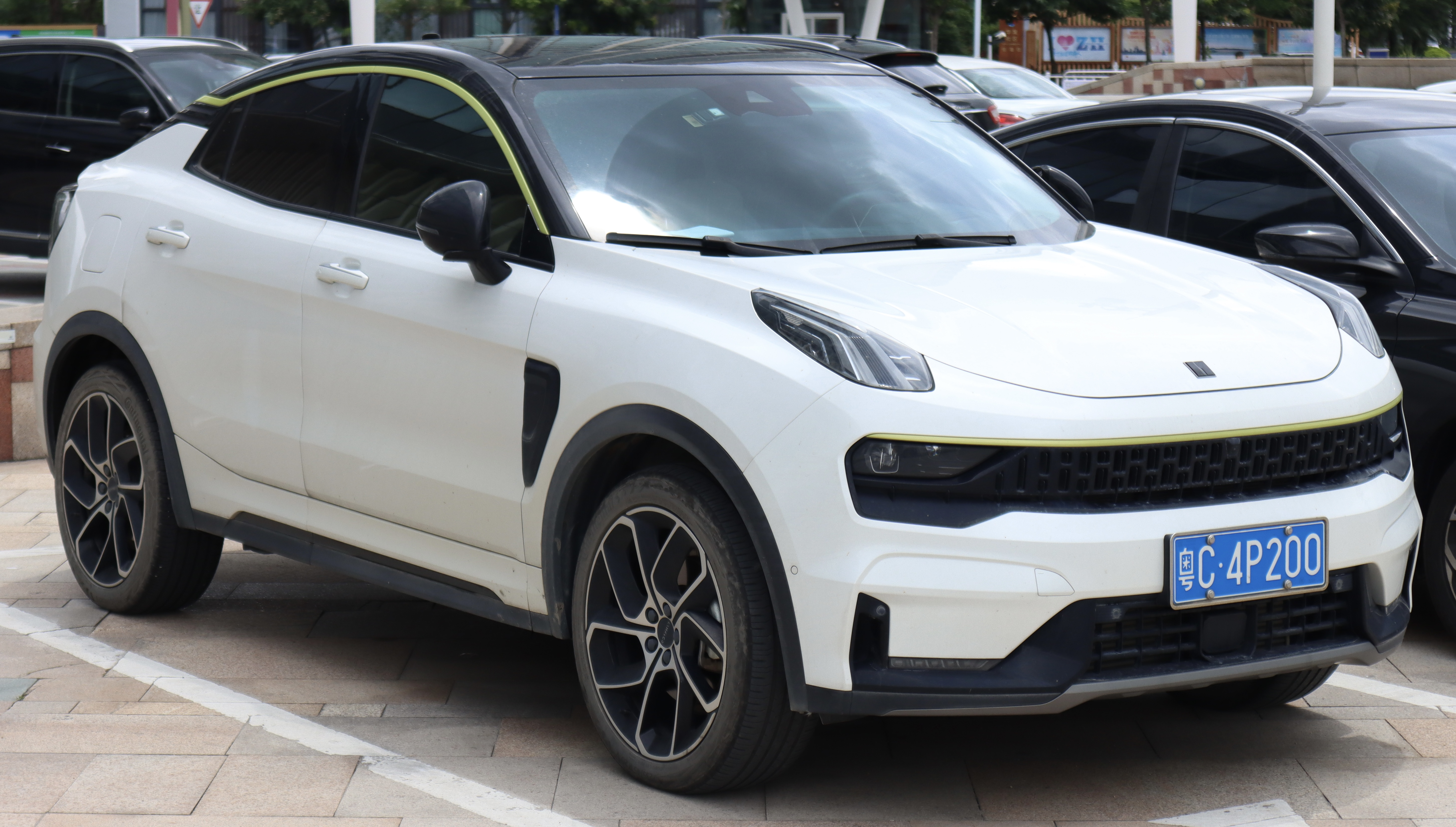

Overview
- Manufacturer: Lynk & Co (Geely)
- Model code: DCY11
- Production: 2019–present
- Model years: 2020–present
- Assembly: China: Luqiao, Zhejiang (Luqiao CMA Super Factory)
- Designer: Peter Horbury

Body and chassis
- Class: Compact crossover SUV (C)
- Body style: 5-door SUV
- Layout: Front-engine, front-wheel-drive
- Platform: CMA platform
- Related: Lynk & Co 03; Volvo XC40

Powertrain
- Engine: Petrol: 2.0 L Drive-E T4 turbo I4; Petrol plug-in hybrid: 1.5 L JLH-3G15TD turbo I3
- Transmission: 6 & 8- speed automatic; 7-speed 7DCT dual-clutch

Dimensions
- Wheelbase: 2,734 mm (107.6 in)
- Length: 4,592 mm (180.8 in)
- Width: 1,879 mm (74.0 in)
- Height: 1,628 mm (64.1 in)

The Lynk & Co 05 (Chinese: 领克05; pinyin: Lǐng kè 05) is a compact crossover SUV manufactured by Geely-owned Chinese-Swedish automaker Lynk & Co since 2020 in China.

== Presentation ==
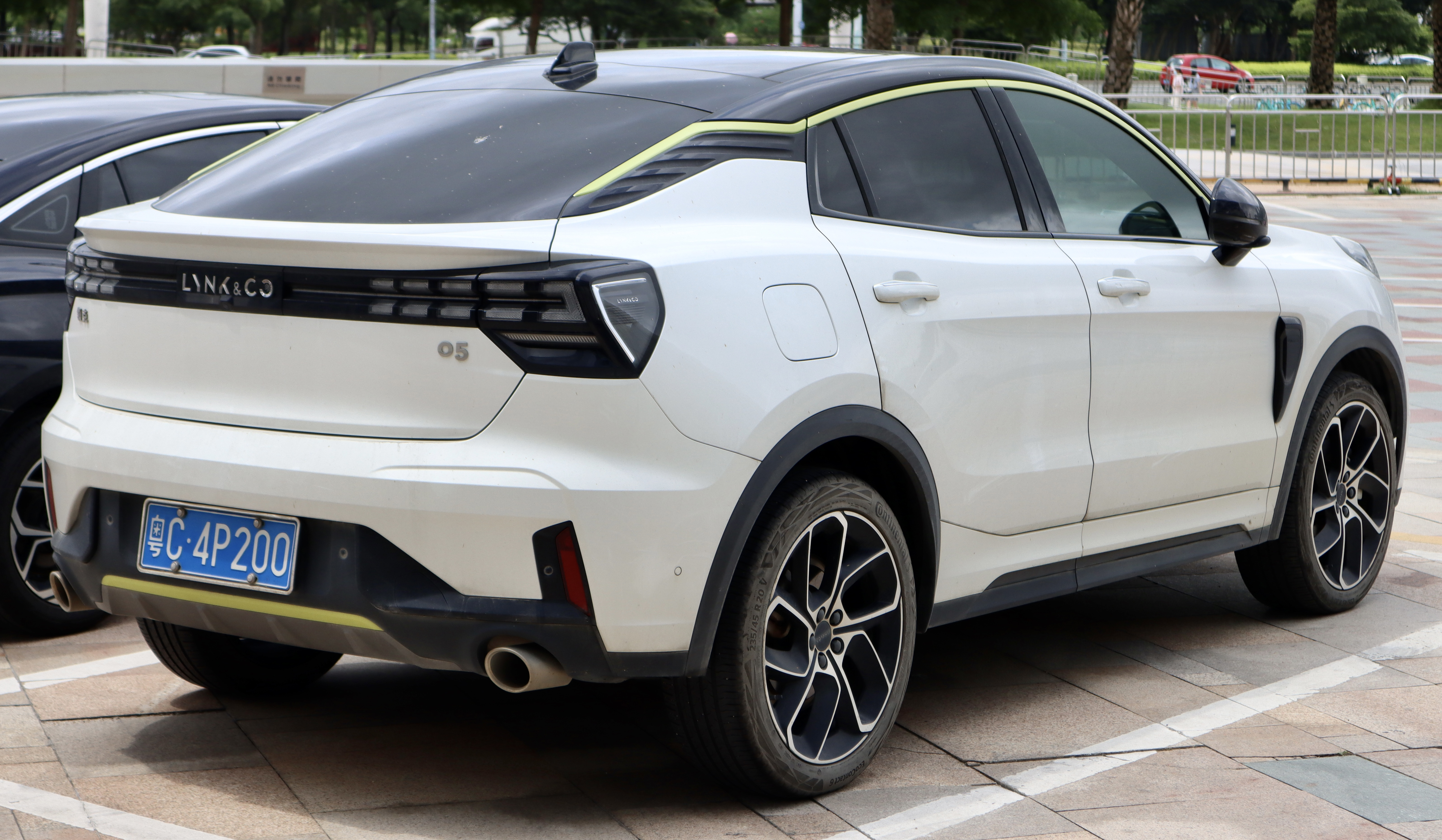
Rear view

The 05 was unveiled in November 2019 by the manufacturer by publishing on the canvas photos of its crossover. It is the coupé version of the 01, from which it takes up the front face as well as its interior, and it is 80 mm (3.1 in) longer.

== Technical characteristics ==
The Lynk & Co 05 is based on the Compact Modular Architecture platform of the Swedish manufacturer Volvo, which is used for XC40.

The Lynk & Co 05 was launched with a turbocharged 2.0-litre four-cylinder engine mild hybrid powertrain, producing 187 kW (251 hp; 254 PS) and 349 N⋅m (257 lb⋅ft; 36 kg⋅m). Transmission is an eight-speed automatic transmission. Two turbocharged 1.5-litre three-cylinder engines was added to the lineup shortly after with one of the powertrains being a plug-in hybrid model.

=== Lynk & Co 05+ ===
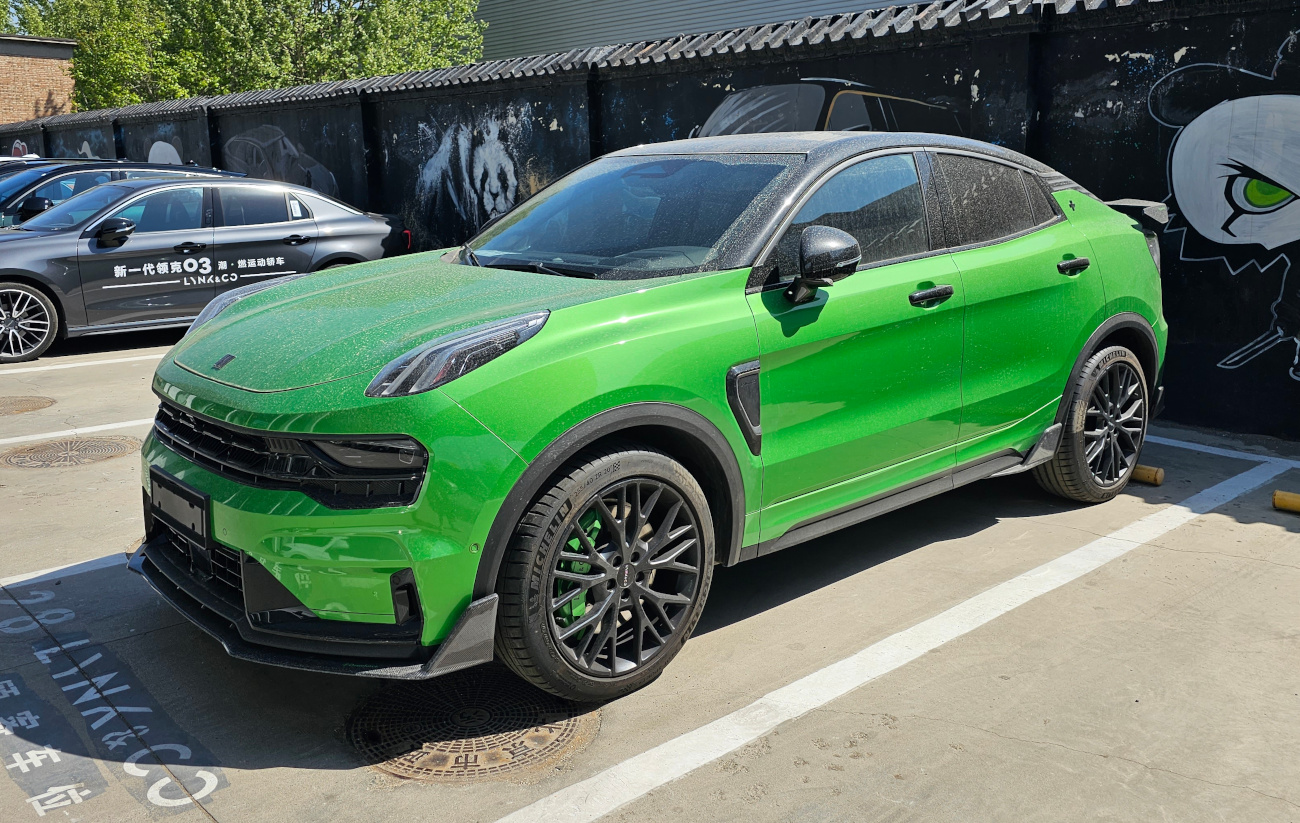
Lynk & Co 05+

A performance oriented variant called the 05+ was launched in August 2021. Powering the 05+ is a 2.0-liter turbocharged four-cylinder engine shared with the other 05 models. However, the engine of the 05+ was tweaked to pump out 265 hp (198 kW; 269 PS) and 380 N⋅m (280 lb⋅ft; 39 kg⋅m) of torque, as opposed to the 251 hp (187 kW; 254 PS) and 349 N⋅m (257 lb⋅ft; 36 kg⋅m) of standard models. Mated to the engine is an Aisin eight-speed automated manual transmission with four wheel drive. Top speed of the 05+ is 230 km/h (143 mph).

== Sales ==
Year	China
2020	32,502
2021	22,538
2022	8,995
2023	3,264
2024	819
2025	77
