= Lynk & Co Z20 =

Battery electric compact crossover SUV

Lynk & Co 20
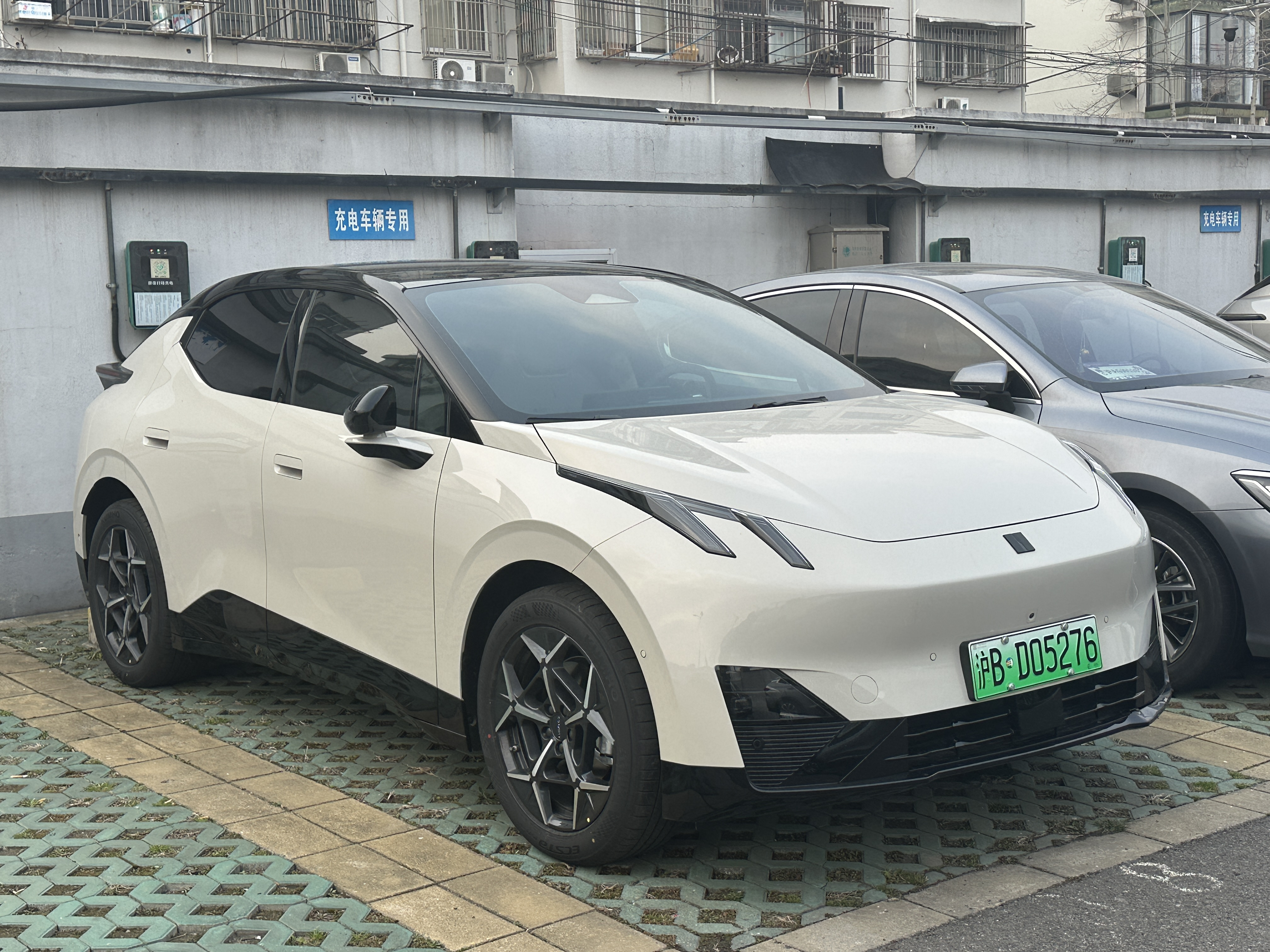

Overview
- Manufacturer: Lynk & Co (Zeekr)
- Model code: E335
- Also called: Lynk & Co Z20 (China, 2024–2026); Lynk & Co 02 (global)
- Production: 2024–present
- Assembly: China: Zhangjiakou
- Designer: Habib Orhan

Body and chassis
- Class: Compact crossover SUV
- Body style: 5-door SUV
- Layout: Rear-motor, rear-wheel-drive
- Platform: Sustainable Experience Architecture (SEA2)
- Related: Zeekr X; Smart #1; Volvo EX30

Powertrain
- Power output: 235–335 hp (175–250 kW; 238–340 PS)
- Battery: 51.2 kWh LFP VREMT; 61.47 kWh LFP VREMT; 61.52 kWh Aegis Golden LFP VREMT; 66 kWh NMC; 70.01 kWh Aegis Golden LFP VREMT
- Electric range: 430–530 km (267–329 mi) (CLTC); 435–445 km (270–277 mi) (WLTP)
- Plug-in charging: DC: 150–460kW (6C)

Dimensions
- Wheelbase: 2,755 mm (108.5 in)
- Length: 4,460 mm (175.6 in); 4,495 mm (177.0 in) (2026 update)
- Width: 1,845 mm (72.6 in)
- Height: 1,573 mm (61.9 in)
- Curb weight: 1,899–1,919 kg (4,187–4,231 lb)

The Lynk & Co 20 (Chinese: 领克20; pinyin: Lǐng kè 20), previously the Lynk & Co Z20 until 2026, is a battery electric compact crossover SUV marketed by Lynk & Co since 2024.

== Overview ==
In China, the Lynk & Co 20 is the brand's second EV following the 10 sedan. While in Europe, this will be Lynk & Co's first EV and as it is the second model sold in the European markets, the name in Europe will be 02 and in China 20 (as there is already a model named 02).

In Europe, it will be Lynk & Co's first EV and will be marketed as the Lynk & Co 02. The 20 shares multiple design elements with a closely related Zeekr X crossover.

The exterior features Lynk & Co's 'The Next Day' design language, featuring the fork-shaped daytime running lights. It has a heavily sloping rear end which ends in a ducktail spoiler containing the lightbar style taillights, and allows the 20 to have a drag coefficient of 0.25 C_{d}, compared to the 0.28 C_{d} of the Zeekr X.

It uses a MacPherson strut front suspension and five-link independent rear suspension, and has optional continuous damping control.

The interior is equipped with a 10.25-inch digital instrument cluster supplemented by a 13.8-inch HUD, and a 15.4-inch central infotainment touchscreen all powered by the Dragon Eagle 1 Plus SoC, with two wireless charging pads located below. It has a two-spoke steering wheel with a column shifter, and it is equipped with a 14-speaker Harman Kardon sound system. It also has seats with a 'zero-gravity' recline mode, and the center console contains a refrigerator compartment. The 20 has a 450-litre (15.9 cu ft) rear cargo area, which expands to 1,410 litres (49.8 cu ft) with the rear seats folded down supplemented by a frunk.

The 20 uses a MacPherson strut front suspension and a five-link independent rear suspension.

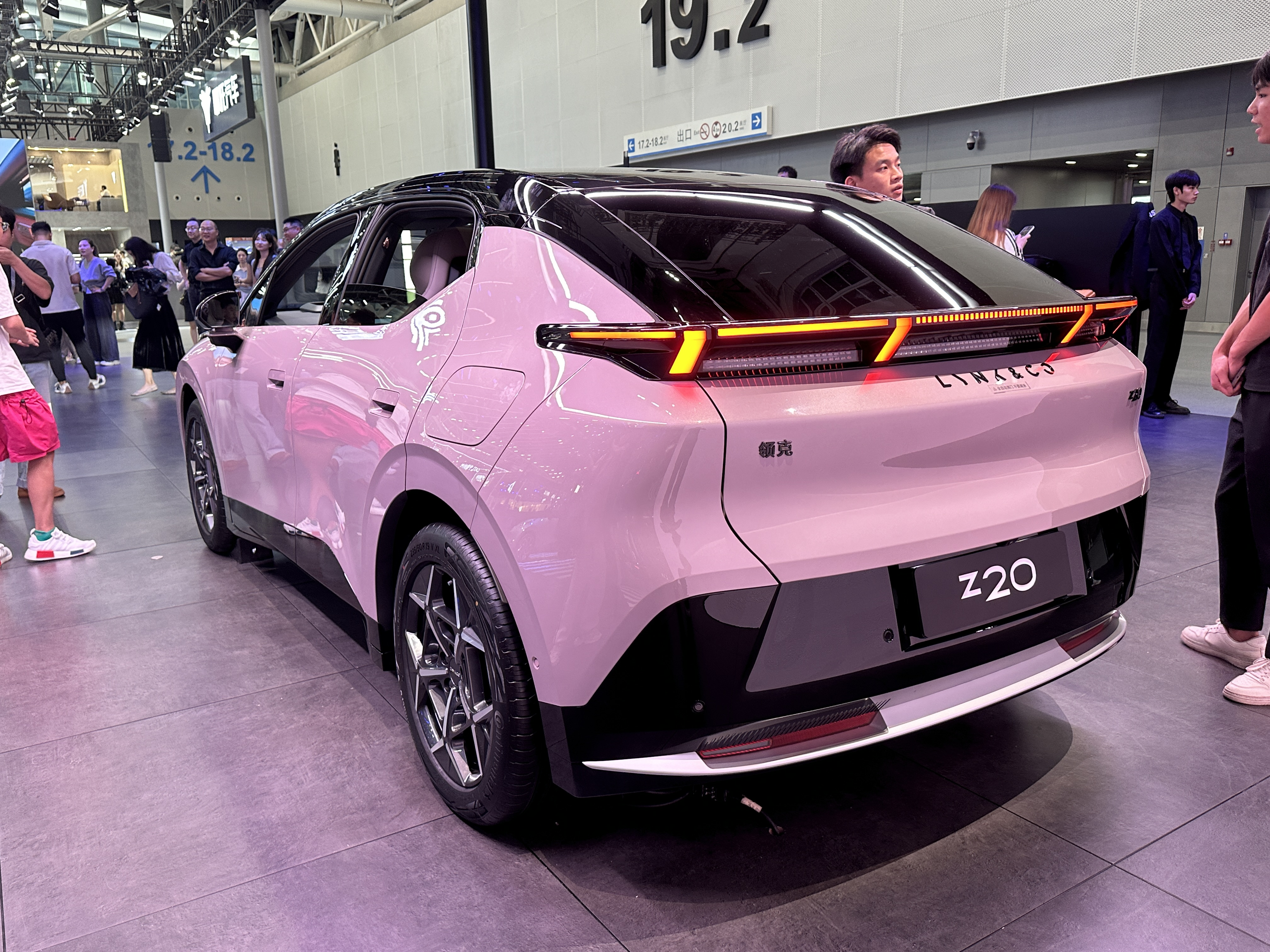
Rear view

=== 2026 update ===
The vehicle was renamed to the Lynk & Co 20 for its update which went on sale on 28 September 2026 in China as the 2027 model year.

The exterior sees minor changes including a black strip connecting the now separated headlight units, body color accents on the lower door, a new roof spoiler, and a redesigned diffuser, resulting in a 35 mm (1.4 in) longer overall vehicle length.

The interior remains mostly similar but features minor changes including better integrated instrument panel and heads-up display, cockpit chipset upgraded to the Dragon Eagle 6P, redesigned center console with volume dial and HVAC control buttons, electronic door handles, mechanical air vent controls, a new 23-speaker Flyme sound system with headrest speakers, 6.8-litre (0.24 cu ft) refrigerator compartment in the center console, threaded accessory mounts, and new upholstery options. The frunk has been significantly enlarged from 23 litres (0.81 cu ft) to 125 litres (4.4 cu ft) which now fits a 37.5 L (1.32 cu ft) freezer accessory.

The Qianli Haohan H5 ADAS system now comes standard, which features a 192-line roof-mounted LiDAR, 3 mmWave radar, 11 cameras, and 12 ultrasonic sensors, all powered by a 128 TOPS Horizon Robotics J6M chip and is capable of assisted driving in highway and urban conditions.

The powertrain receives a major overhaul with a new motor and new battery packs, which offer more range and significantly faster charging.

Lynk & Co 20 (2026)

Rear view

== Powertrain ==
It is equipped with a 335 hp (250 kW; 340 PS) rear motor outputting 373 N⋅m (275 lb⋅ft) of torque, allowing for a 0–100 km/h (62 mph) time of 5.3 seconds and a top speed of 190 km/h (118 mph). Power is supplied by a 61.5 kWh LFP battery pack designed and produced in house by parent company Zeekr's VREMT (Viridi E-Mobility Technology) battery division, which provides 530 kilometres (329 mi) of CLTC range and is capable of 300 kW peak charging rates for 4.5C charging from 10–80% in 15 minutes. A variant with a smaller battery was added in 2025 with capacity of 51.2 kWh capable of a CLTC range of 430 kilometres (267 mi) and 10–80% in 18 minutes (3.3C) with a lower 185 kW peak. It is paired with a 235 hp (175 kW; 238 PS) motor, which allows for a 0–100 km/h (62 mph) time of 6.9 seconds and a top speed of 180 km/h (112 mph).

=== 2026 update ===
For the 2026 update, the vehicle receives an all-new powertrain which uses an 800-volt architecture as standard. It uses Geely's new 16-in-1 powertrain module, which integrates the motor, motor controller, gear reduction, DC-DC converter, onboard AC charger, power distribution unit, high-voltage and low-voltage battery management systems, vehicle control unit, thermal management system, active pre-charge control, power domain gateway, energy management, charging management, motion management, and health management functions into one single integrated module. Geely says the integration eliminates over 180 parts, reduces weight by 15% to 75 kg (165 lb), and reduces high-voltage and low-voltage wiring by 30% and 15%, respectively. Geely says it has a peak efficiency of 93.8%, power density of 11.8 kW/kg (7.2 hp/lb; 15.8 hp/kg), and a height of 325 mm (12.8 in) which increases trunk volume by up to 28 litres (0.99 cu ft). All variants now use a rear motor outputting 328 hp (245 kW; 333 PS) and 320 N⋅m (236 lb⋅ft) of torque, which increases the top speed to 201 km/h (125 mph). The 20 receives two new LFP battery packs supplied by VREMT and are both capable of 6C recharging from 10–80% within 12 minutes. The standard battery is 61.52 kWh and has a peak charge rate of 420 kW and achieves 545 km (339 mi) of CLTC range, while the larger battery is 70.01 kWh and has a peak charge rate of 460 kW and 630 km (391 mi) of CLTC range.

Specifications (China)
Year	Battery		Power	Torque	Range	Charging		0–100 km/h (62 mph) time	Top speed	Kerb weight
Year	Type	Weight	Power	Torque	CLTC	Peak DC	10–80%	0–100 km/h (62 mph) time	Top speed	Kerb weight
2025–26	51.2 kWh LFP VREMT	388 kg (855 lb)	235 hp (175 kW; 238 PS)	300 N⋅m (221 lb⋅ft)	430 km (267 mi)	185 kW	18 min	6.9 sec	180 km/h (112 mph)	1,799 kg (3,966 lb)
2024–26	61.47 kWh LFP VREMT	484 kg (1,067 lb)	335 hp (250 kW; 340 PS)	373 N⋅m (275 lb⋅ft)	530 km (329 mi)	300 kW	15 min	5.3 sec	190 km/h (118 mph)	1,919 kg (4,231 lb)
2026–present	61.52 kWh LFP VREMT	443 kg (977 lb)	328 hp (245 kW; 333 PS)	320 N⋅m (236 lb⋅ft)	545 km (339 mi)	420 kW	12 min	6.4 sec	201 km/h (125 mph)	1,815 kg (4,001 lb)
2026–present	70.01 kWh LFP VREMT	497 kg (1,096 lb)	328 hp (245 kW; 333 PS)	320 N⋅m (236 lb⋅ft)	630 km (391 mi)	460 kW	12 min	6.4 sec	201 km/h (125 mph)	1,890 kg (4,167 lb)

== Markets ==
=== China ===
The 20 was launched in China on 22 December 2024.

In July 2025, cheaper variants with a lower range of 430 kilometres (267 mi) and power reduced to 235 hp (175 kW; 238 PS) was introduced in China. It also adds a new Fiji Green paint option, new 18-inch wheel option, and makes the previously standard 14-speaker sound system optional for the new variants.

=== Europe ===
In Europe, the 20 is marketed as the Lynk & Co 02, and is fitted with a different powertrain compared to the Chinese market version. It is equipped with a 268 hp (200 kW; 272 PS) motor powered by a 66 kWh NMC battery pack capable of 150 kW peak charging speeds, allowing for a 10–80% charge time of 30 minutes.

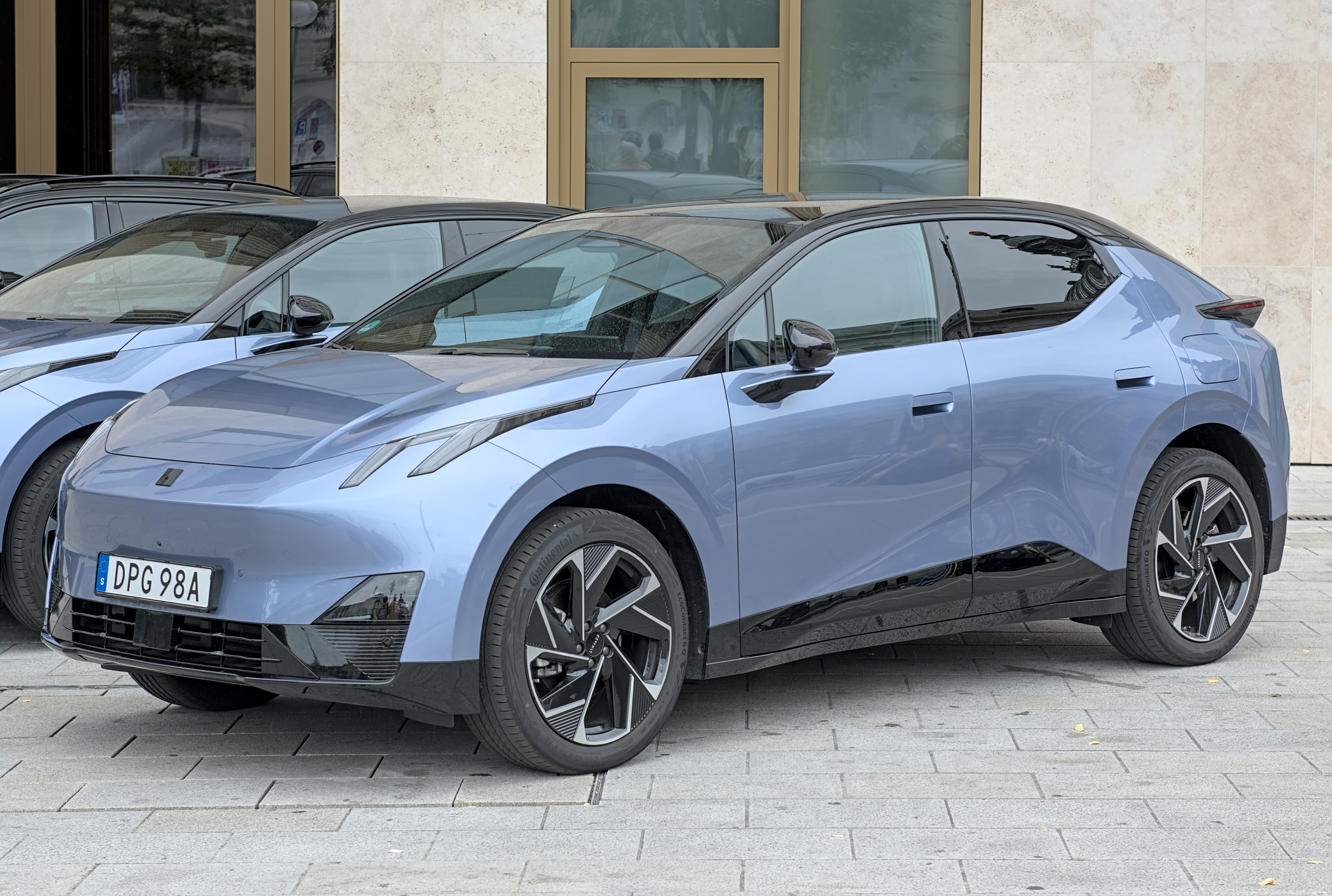
Lynk & Co 02

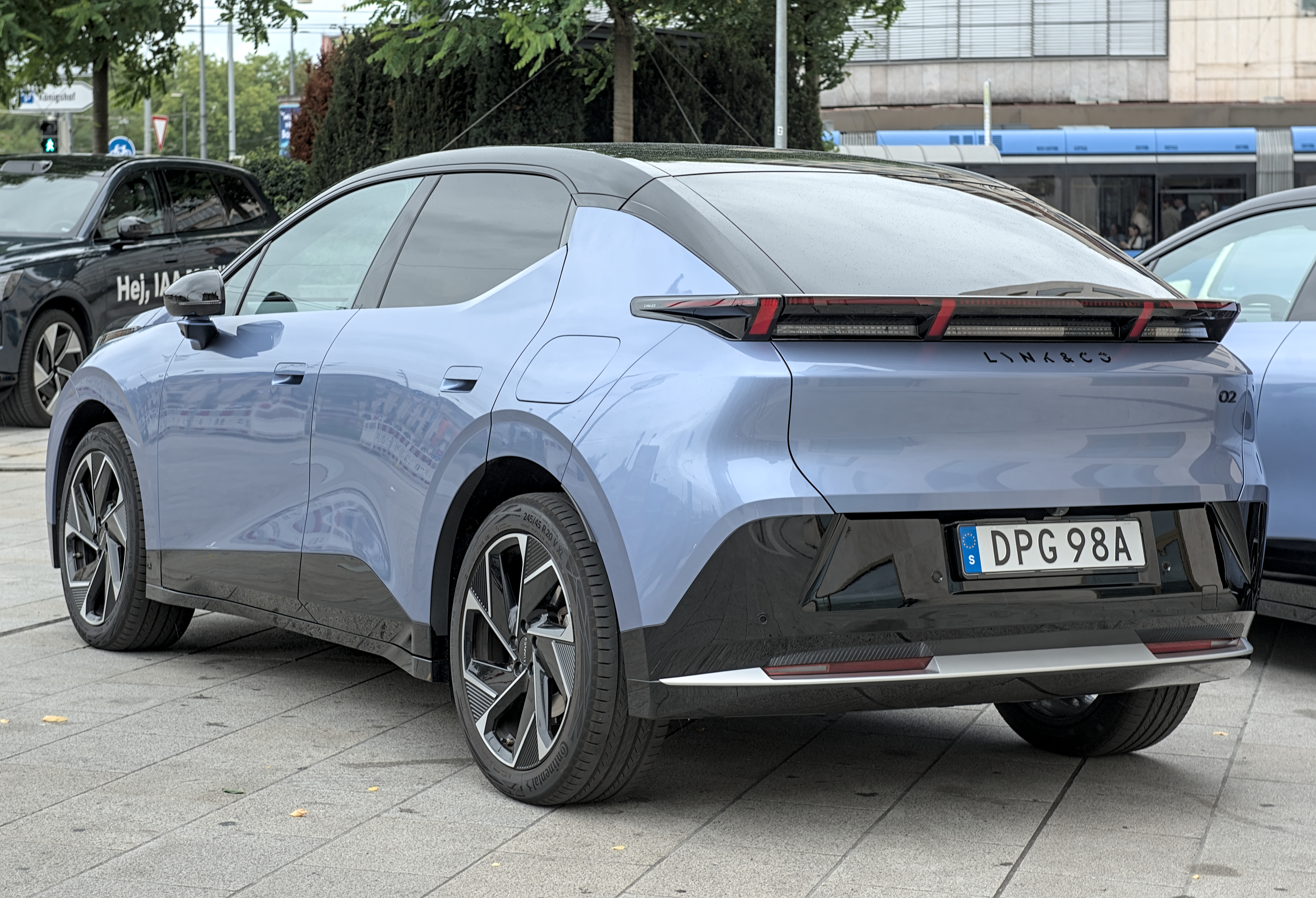
Rear view

Interior

Front boot

== Safety ==
=== Euro NCAP ===
Euro NCAP test results Lynk & Co 02 Ultra (LHD) (2025)
Test	Points	%
Overall:	5 /5 stars	
Adult occupant:	36.1	90%
Child occupant:	42.7	87%
Pedestrian:	52.6	83%
Safety assist:	16.1	89%

== Sales ==
Lynk & Co announced that the updated 20 received 14,663 refundable pre-orders within one hour of its launch on 28 September 2026.

Year	China
2024	1,389
2025	38,147
