= Lynk & Co 07 =

Plug-in hybrid mid-size sedan and station wagon

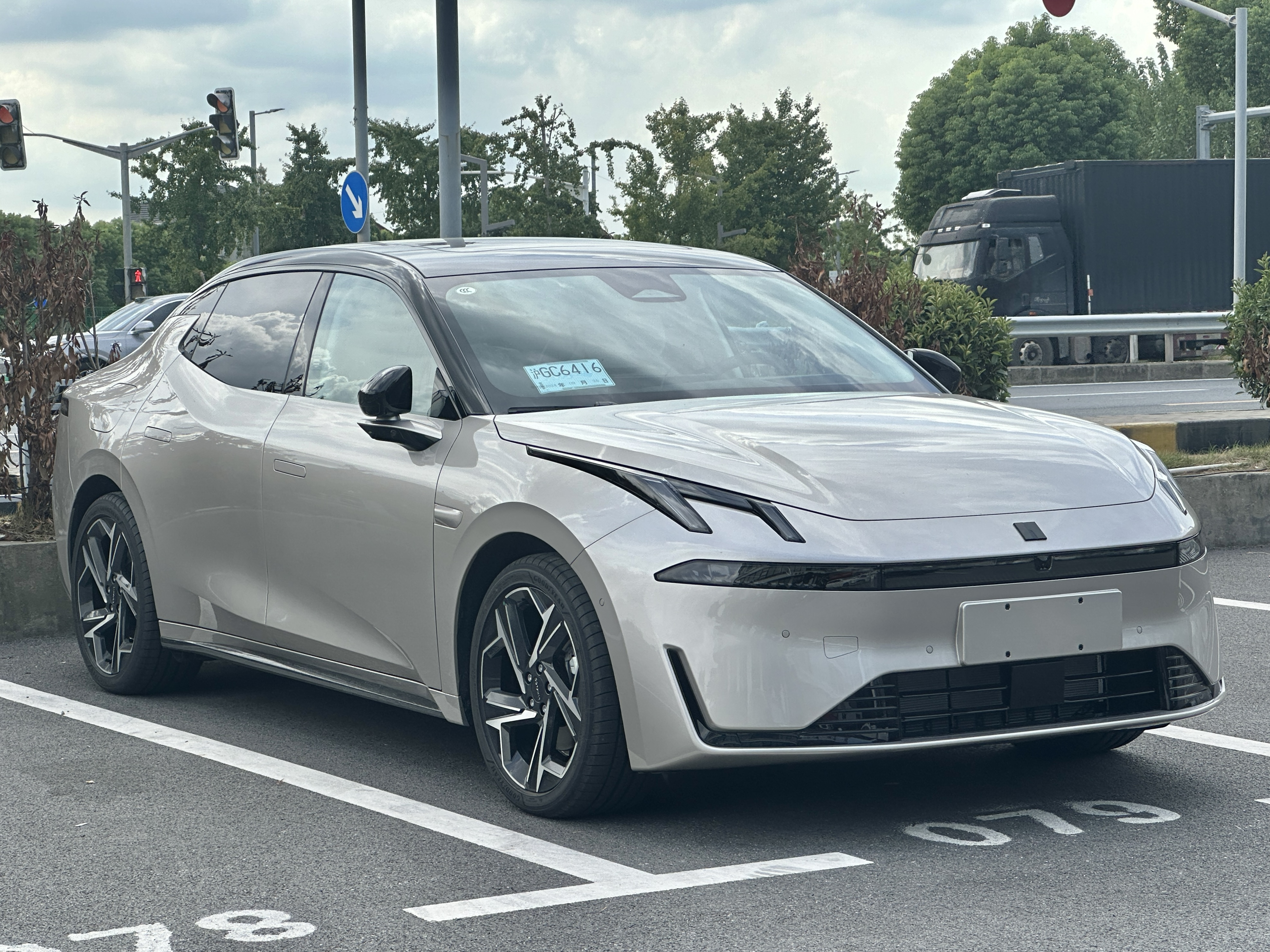

Overview
- Manufacturer: Lynk & Co (Zeekr)
- Model code: CS21
- Also called: Lynk & Co 07 GT (wagon)
- Production: 2024–present
- Assembly: China: Ningbo, Zhejiang (Meishu plant)
- Designer: Chief exterior designer Nicolas Blondeau, Chief interior designer Pontus Merkel, Chief CMF designer Burcin Kesercioglu, Lead CMF Designer Guillermo Colomer Goenaga

Body and chassis
- Class: Mid-size car (D)
- Body style: 4-door fastback sedan; 5-door station wagon (GT)
- Layout: Front-engine, front single motor, front-wheel-drive; Front-engine, dual-motor, four-wheel-drive
- Platform: CMA Evo platform
- Related: Lynk & Co 08

Powertrain
- Engine: 1.5 L BHE5-BFZ turbo I4
- Electric motor: 160 kW permanent magnet synchronous
- Transmission: 3-speed DHT
- Battery: 18.4 kWh LFP CATL; 18.99 kWh LFP CALB
- Electric range: 103 km (64 mi) (WLTC); 126 km (78 mi) (CLTC)

Dimensions
- Wheelbase: 2,843 mm (111.9 in)
- Length: 4,827 mm (190.0 in)
- Width: 1,900 mm (74.8 in)
- Height: 1,480 mm (58.3 in)
- Curb weight: 1,885–1,915 kg (4,156–4,222 lb)

The Lynk & Co 07 (Chinese: 领克07; pinyin: Lǐng kè 07) is a plug-in hybrid mid-size sedan and station wagon manufactured by Geely-owned Chinese-Swedish automaker Lynk & Co.

== Overview ==
The 07 was previewed by the Lynk & Co The Next Day, which was presented in China on 7 June 2022, announcing the next line of new models.

Just like the 08, the 07 is based on the CMA (Compact Modular Architecture) 2.0 platform. It is the technical twin of the Volvo XC40, which is produced by Volvo Cars.

The interior is equipped with a 12.3-inch LCD instrument screen along with a 2.5k resolution 15.4-inch central control screen featuring LYNK Flyme Auto OS in collaboration with Meizu.

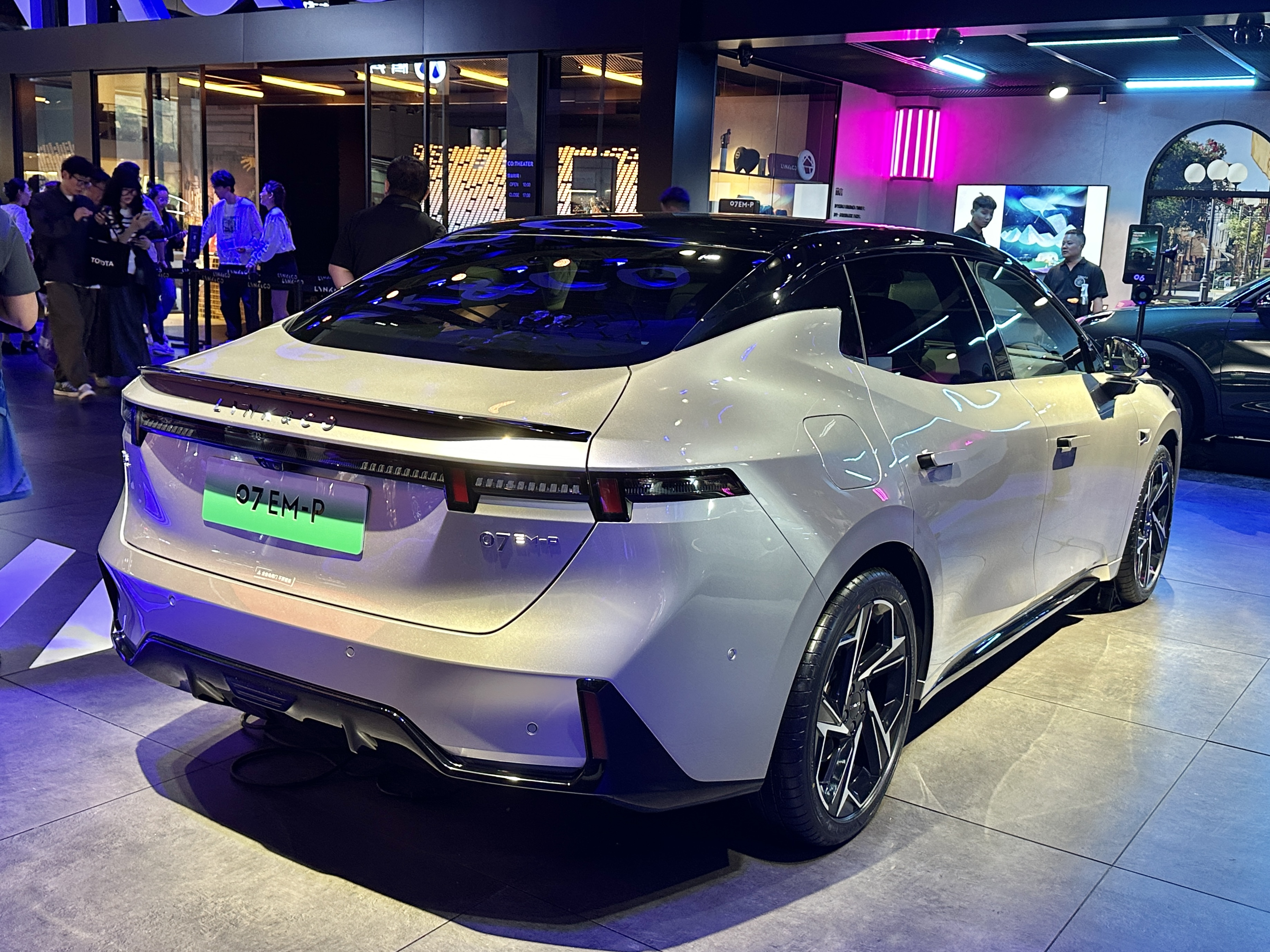
Rear view

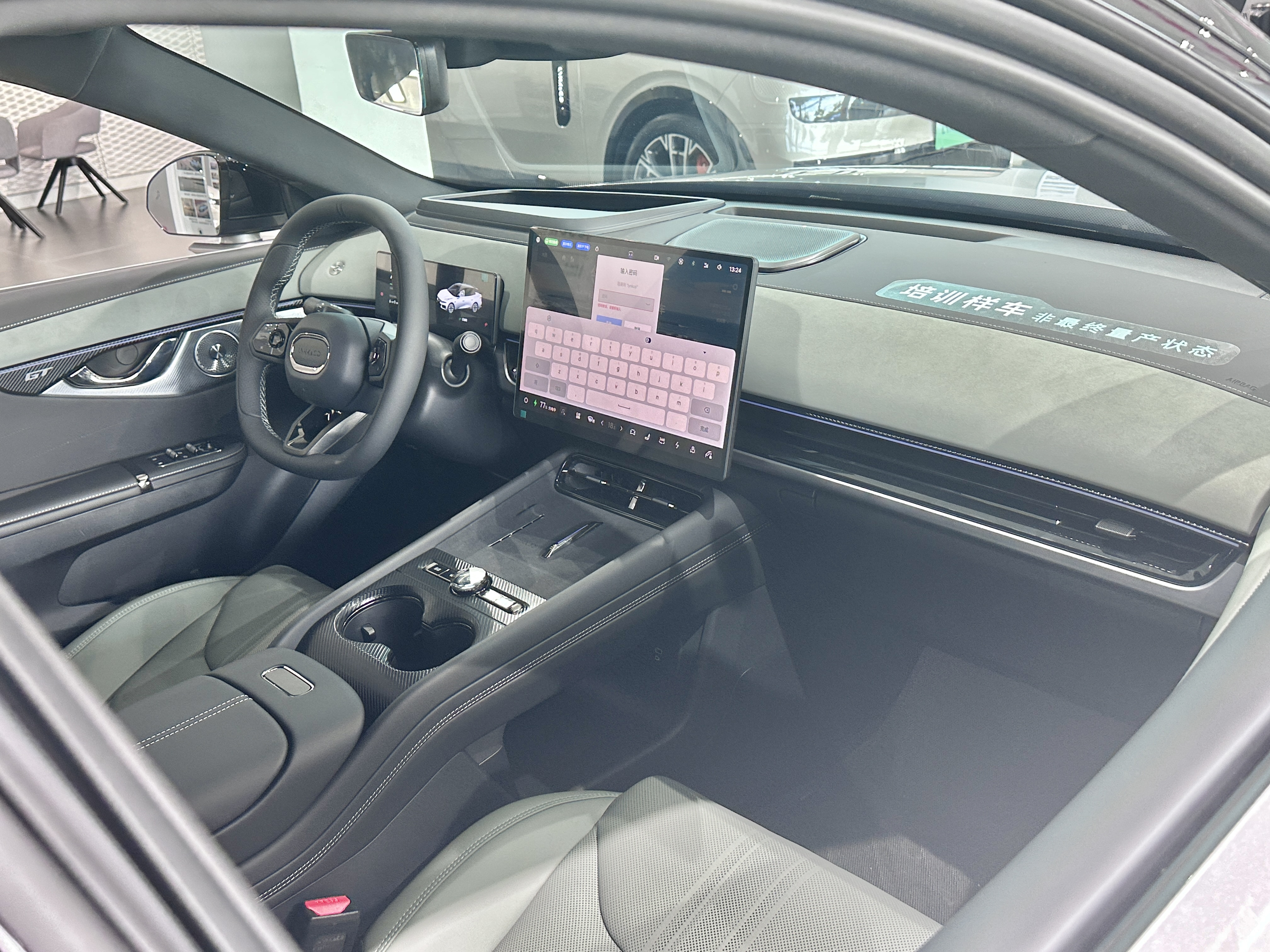
Interior

== Powertrain ==
The EM-P plug-in hybrid powertrain of the Lynk & Co 07 is powered by a 1.5-litre BHE15-BFZ turbocharged inline-four engine producing up to 120 kW (161 hp; 163 PS) of power and a 160 kW (215 hp; 218 PS) and 350 N⋅m (258 lb⋅ft) electric motor on the front axle, mated to a 3-speed DHT, with a 280 kW (375 hp; 381 PS) total power output. The 07 EM-P powertrain also includes a 18.99 kWh lithium iron phosphate battery from CALB.

== 2026 facelift ==
The 2026 model year introduces slightly revised front and rear bumper designs. As for the powertrain, the 07 EM-P's powertrain was lightly updated to use a 18.4 kWh LFP pack supplied by CATL, and total power output increases to 300 kW (402 hp; 408 PS). As a result, 30–80% charging times fall from 27 minutes to 18 minutes.

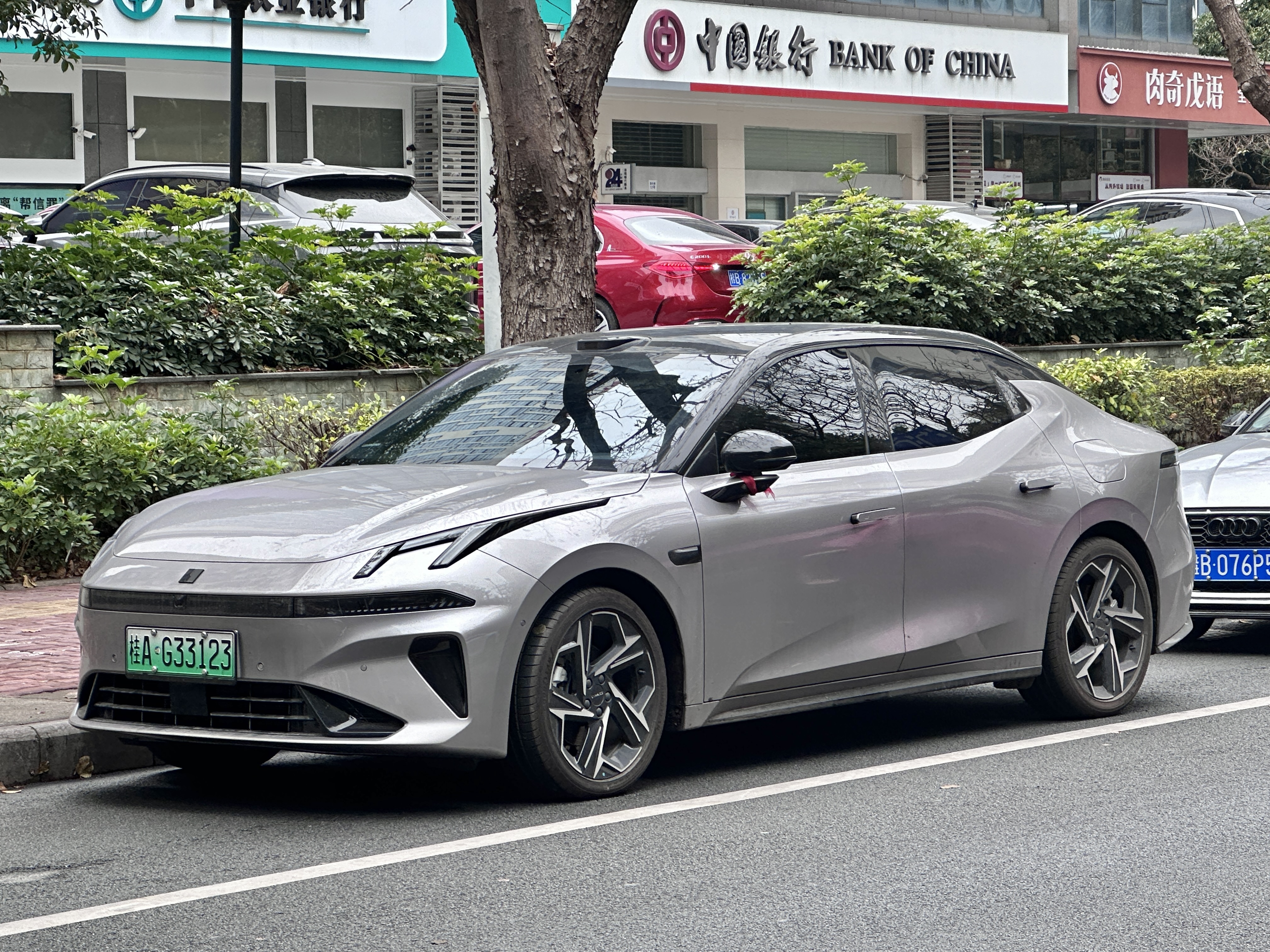
Lynk & Co 07 2026 (facelift)

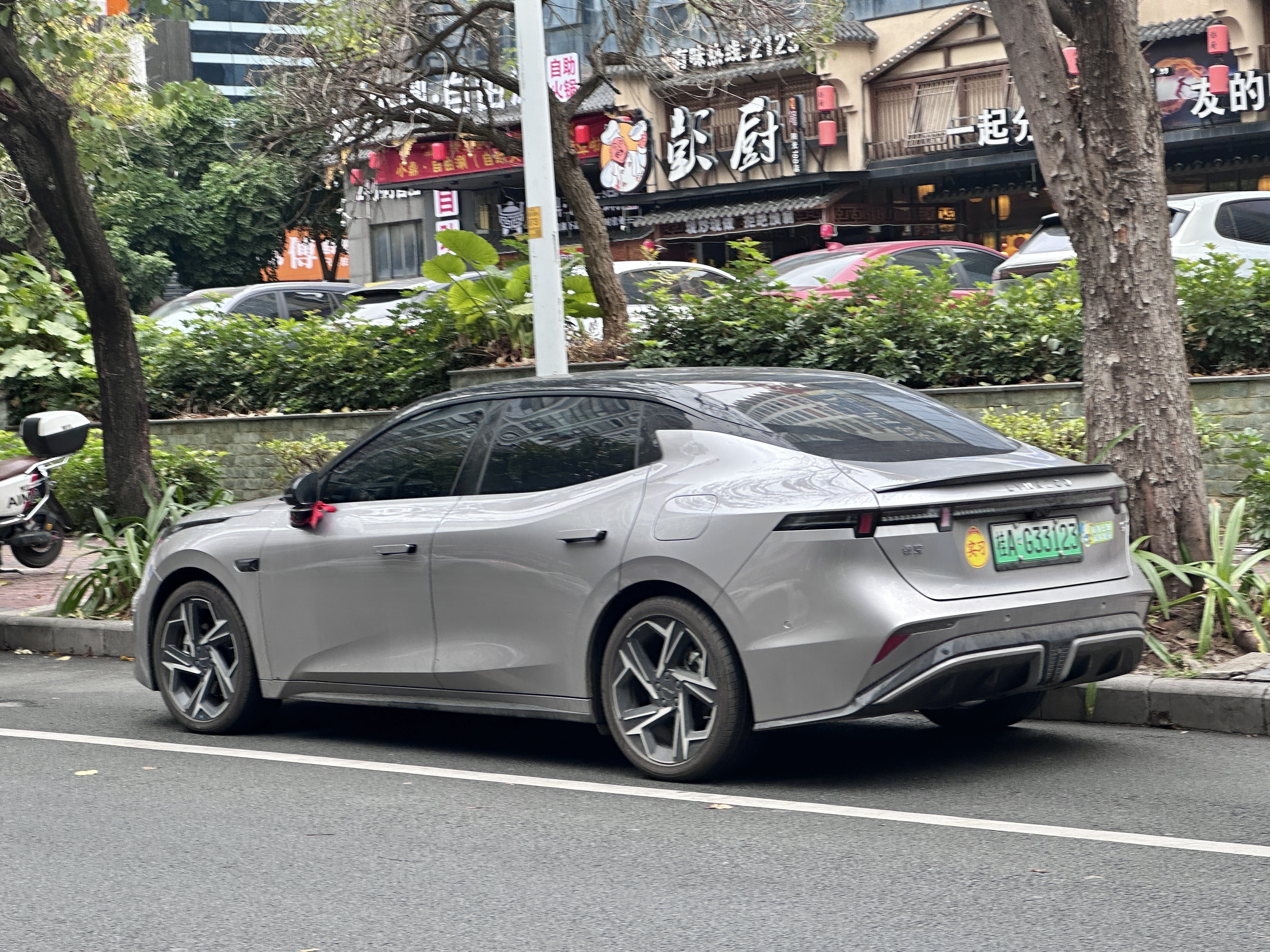
Rear view

== Lynk & Co 07 GT ==
Unveiled on June 11, 2026, the wagon version has been dubbed as the GT. The 07 GT is equipped with the EM-P hybrid system featuring a 1.5 liter turbo engine and a dual motor setup. The engine produces a maximum output of 163hp, while the front P3 electric motor produces 245hp and the rear P4 electric motor produces 122hp. The battery is a 28.3kWh Lithium iron phosphate battery，capable of a CLTC range of more than 200km. The 07 GT will also be equipped with MRC suspension.

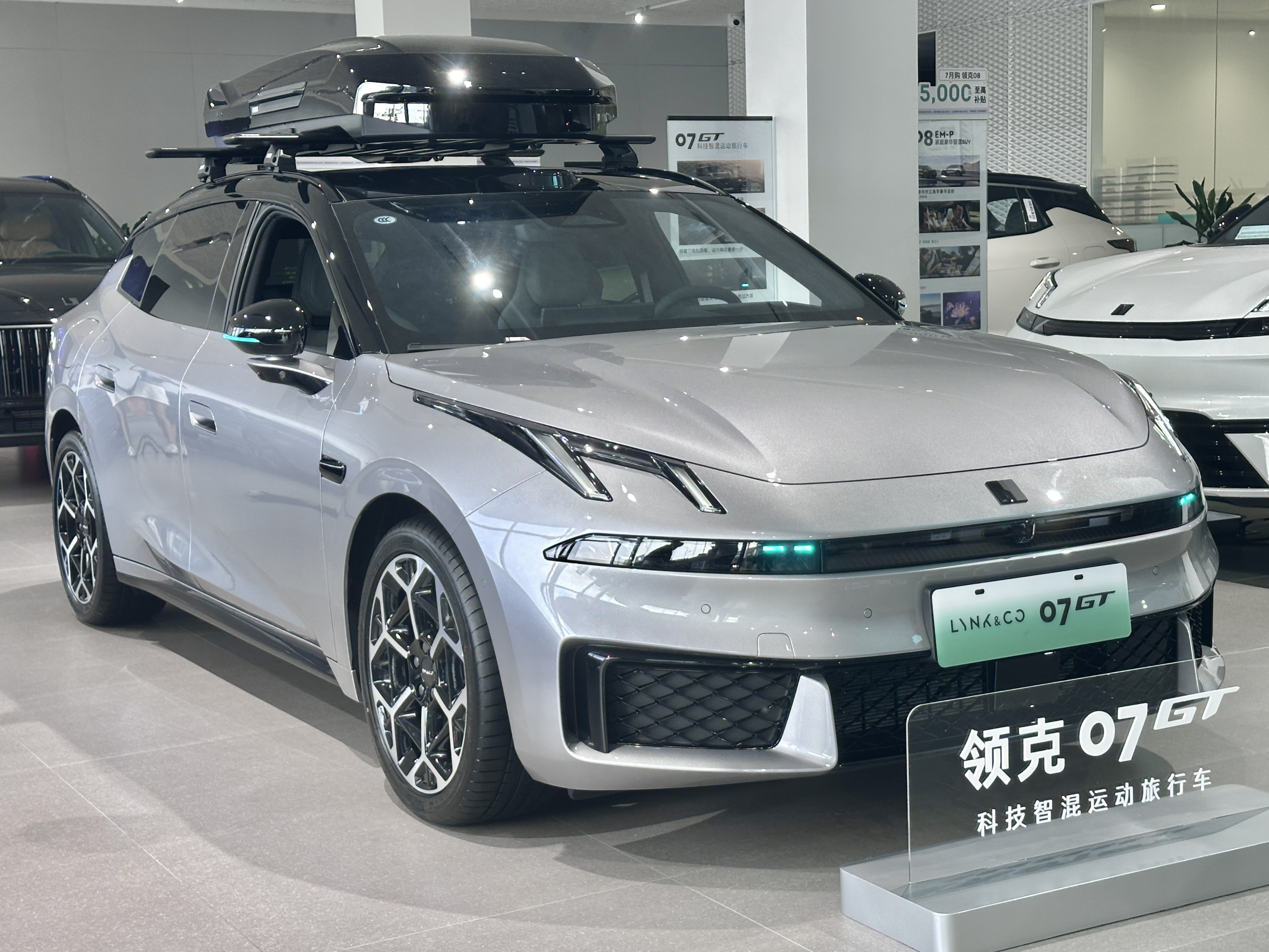
Lynk & Co 07 GT

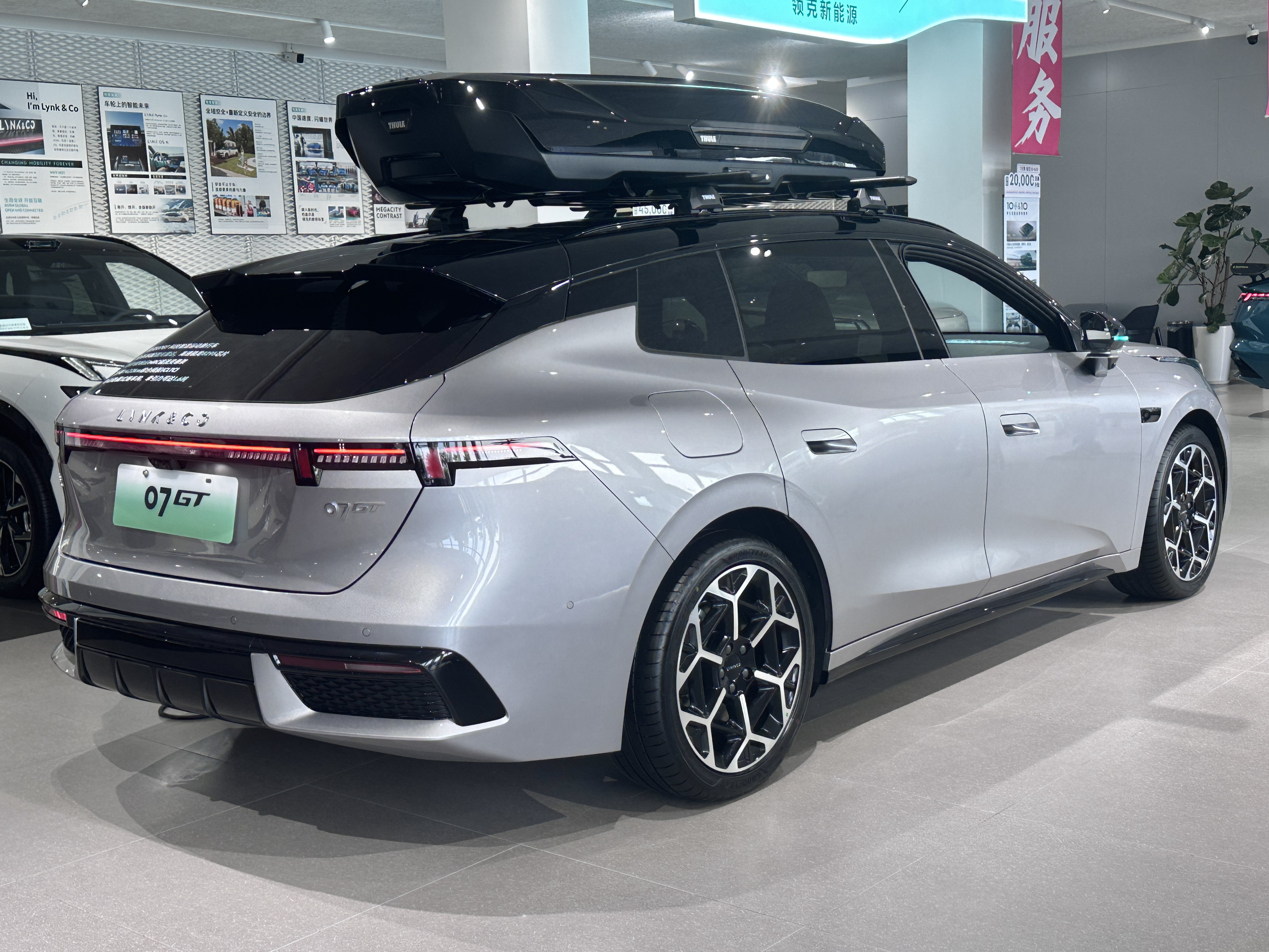
Rear view

== Sales ==
The Lynk & Co 07GT received over 10,000 pre-orders within 27 minutes of its launch on 23 July 2026. On 20 September 2026, Lynk & Co announced that 10,000 07GTs had been delivered since its launch, which it claims is the fastest for station wagons in China.

Year	China
2024	35,582
2025	29,952
