= Lynk & Co =

Automobile manufacturer

Lynk & Co Automotive Technology Co., Ltd
- Type: Subsidiary
- Industry: Automotive
- Founded: 20 October 2016; 10 years ago
- Headquarters: Hangzhou, China
- Area served: China; Europe; Middle East
- Key people: Mo Wang (CEO, Lynk & Co International); Martin Persson (CEO, Lynk & Co Europe)
- Products: Automobiles
- Production output: ▲350,495 vehicles (2025)
- Owner: Zeekr Group (51%); Geely Auto (49%)

Chinese name
- Simplified Chinese: 领克
- Hanyu Pinyin: Lǐng kè
- Website: lynkco.com; lynkco.com.cn (China)

Lynk & Co Automotive Technology Co., Ltd, trading as Lynk & Co, is a Chinese automotive brand headquartered in Hangzhou, China, and co-owned by Chinese automobile manufacturers Geely Auto and Zeekr Group. It was established in 2016, as a three-way joint venture between Volvo Cars, Geely Auto Group and Geely Holding. In November 2024, its ownership structure was revised, resulting in Zeekr holding a 51% stake, while Geely Auto holds the remaining 49%.

Within the Geely group, the brand positioned itself as a startup-like company by introducing innovative sales models such as direct-to-consumer sales model and subscription model to market its vehicles. Lynk & Co shares its technology such as engine and platform with Volvo and Geely vehicles.

== Name ==
The name Lynk & Co was coined from an internal code for the brand, "Lynk", which refers to interconnected cars, while the "& Co" part (a common business name abbreviation for 'and company') was a moniker added to give the name a "young vibe". Its full name was conceived from a casual conversation between Geely executives in a taxi, where they drew inspiration from fashion labels such as Pull & Bear and Abercrombie & Fitch to suit the global market. The brand name was formalised within just three days after the conversation.

Initially, American automaker Ford raised objections to the name due to its similarity to its luxury brand, Lincoln. Lynk & Co argued it was an unintentional coincidence, and Ford later withdrew its threat of legal action.

== History ==
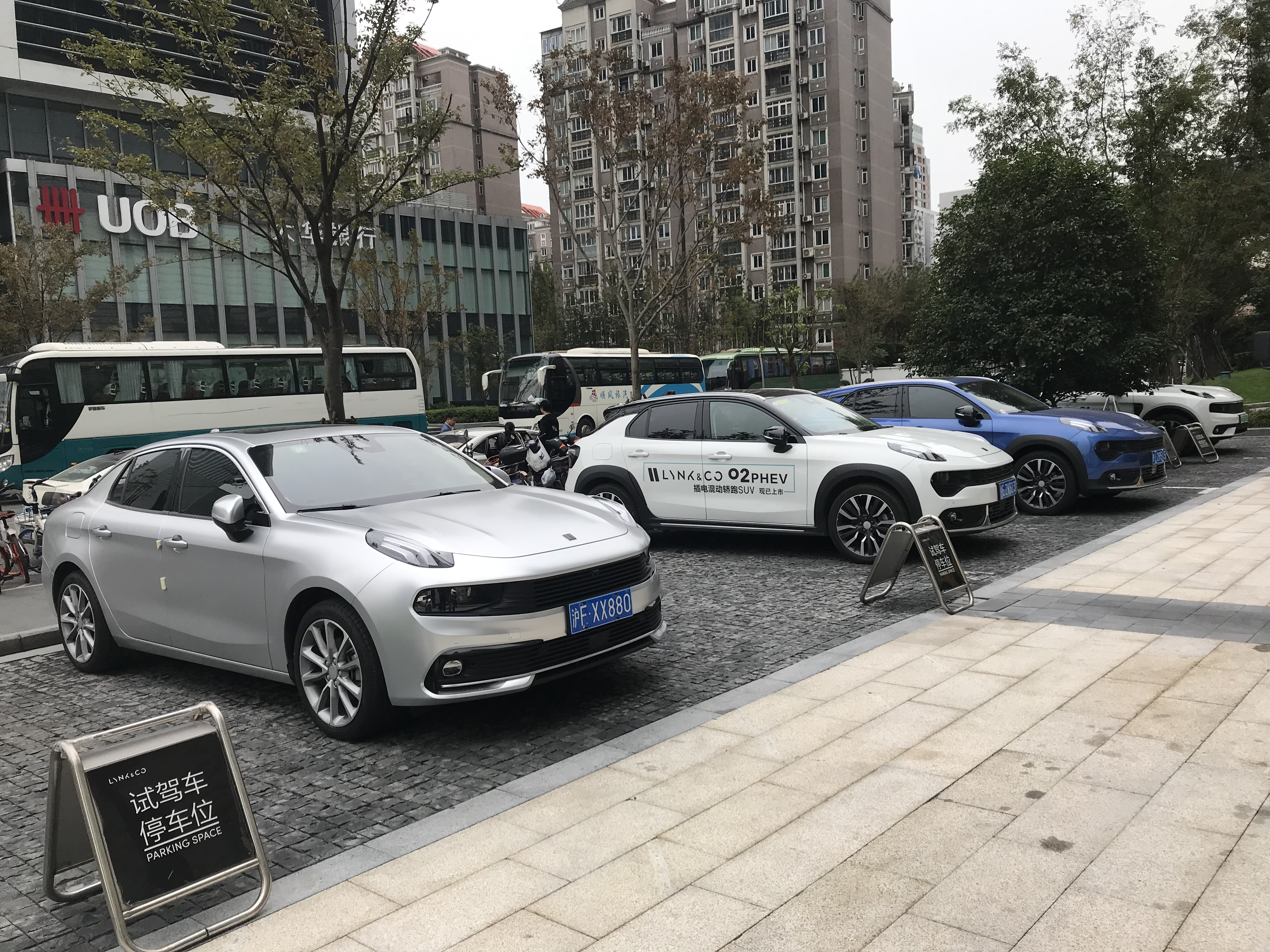
Four Lynk & Co cars

Lynk & Co was launched in 2016 with three production models, all based on the Compact Modular Architecture (CMA) developed by China Euro Vehicle Technology (CEVT) and used also by Volvo, Polestar and Geely. According to Geely designer Peter Horbury, the intention was "to position it between Volvo and Geely as a so-called 'near premium' brand".

In August 2017, Zhejiang Geely Holding, Geely Automobile Holdings and Volvo Car Group signed an agreement at Geely Auto's Hangzhou Bay R&D Center to establish the Lynk & Co joint venture. Under this agreement, Geely Auto controls 50% of Lynk & Co, Volvo held 30%, and Zhejiang Geely Holding held the remaining 20%.

The first product announced by Lynk & Co was the 01 crossover, the production version first shown at the 2017 Auto Shanghai show. Production of the 01 started in China in 2017, in Volvo's production plant in Luqiao district in the city of Taizhou, China, sharing the same production line as the Volvo XC40 and Polestar 2. Since then, Lynk & Co have used three other manufacturing plants. The 02, 02 Hatchback and 03 are manufactured at the Zhangjiakou plant, while the 01, 06, 08 and 09 are manufactured at the Meishan plant 50 km from Ningbo. The 05 and 07 are manufactured at Geely's Luqiao CMA Super Factory.

A concept version of the second model, the 03 sedan, was first shown along with the production 01 in Shanghai. The third model, also based on the platform shared with the Volvo XC40, is the 02. Smaller than the 01, it is a hatchback with styling reminiscent of a crossover. Lynk & Co had originally planned to launch the Lynk & Co 04 as a compact hatchback, however, by 2020 it was cancelled and the nameplate was devoted to an electric scooter instead.

In September 2020, at the Beijing Auto Show, the Lynk & Co Zero concept was revealed to the public. It was expected to be the first fully electric vehicle from Lynk & Co, but instead it became the first model from the new electric vehicle brand, Zeekr, as the Zeekr 001.

=== Restructuring in 2024 ===
In November 2024, the equity structures of Geely Auto, Zeekr, and Lynk & Co were revised as part of Geely Holding Group's restructuring strategy. Geely Holding Group transferred its 11.3% stake in Zeekr Intelligent Technology (Zeekr) to Geely Automobile Holdings (Geely Auto), increasing Geely Auto's shareholding in Zeekr to 62.8%. Zeekr subsequently acquired a 20% stake in Lynk & Co from Geely Auto for 3.6 billion yuan, as well as Volvo Cars' 30% stake in Lynk & Co for 5.4 billion yuan. These transactions raised Zeekr's ownership in Lynk & Co to 51%, with the remaining 49% still held by Geely Auto.

In March 2026, Volvo Cars was appointed as the exclusive importer of Lynk & Co vehicles in Europe. Under the agreement, Volvo Cars will use its retailers in Europe to sell Lynk & Co vehicles.

== Headquarters ==
Lynk & Co has its headquarters near Karlatornet in Gothenburg, Sweden. In 2022, the headquarters building won architectural award for best interior design.

== Corporate leadership ==
=== Current ===
- Nicolas Lopez Appelgren (CEO of Lynk & Co Europe since January 2024)
- Liu Xiangyang (CEO of Lynk & Co Chinese and global operations since 2024)

=== Previous Chief Executive Officers ===
- Alain Visser (2017–2024)

== Marketing ==
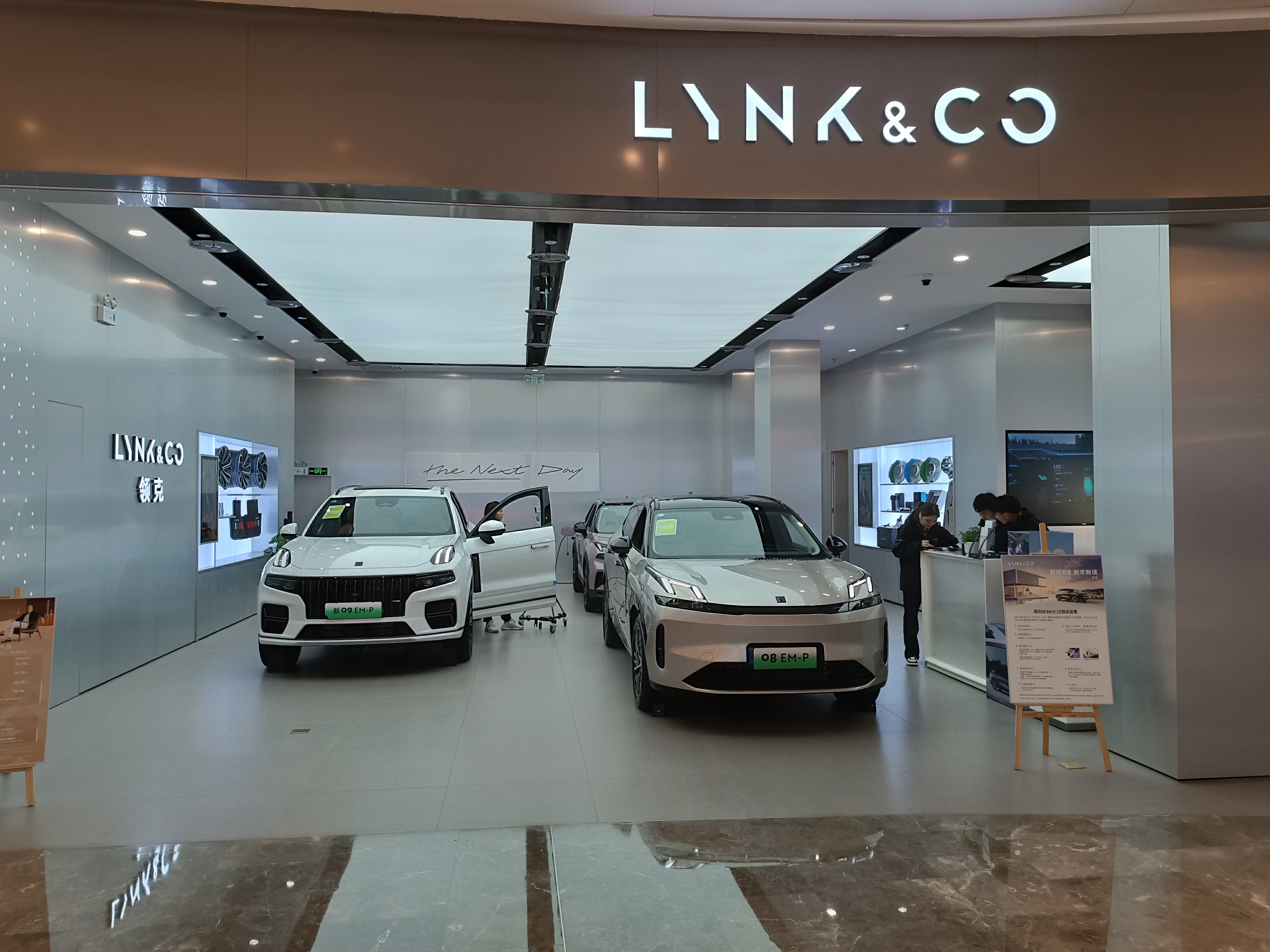
A Lynk & Co showroom in a shopping mall in Shenzhen

Lynk & Co uses a direct-to-consumer sales model in most markets, in contrast to the traditional dealership model. The brand was influenced by Tesla which has had success doing direct sales. Each car is ordered directly by the buyer and customized using equipment packages, either online or via a retail outlet. Lynk & Co also offers vehicle subscription services to customers.

The brand opened 221 retail outlets in China as of 2019, and expanded to Europe in 2020. In China, Lynk & Co vehicles are distributed by Lynk & Co Auto Sales Co., Ltd.

Lynk & Co will sell its cars in Brazil from 2026 with its own operations, independent of Zeekr or any partnership with the Renault Group.

== Overseas markets ==
The brand only offers electric and plug-in hybrid models in Europe. While the sales are steady in China, its European business created huge loss and in total for 2020–2021 the company made a loss of 1 billion Swedish kronor, or about 100 million euros.

In Europe, Lynk & Co is only available in Sweden, the Netherlands, Belgium, Germany, Spain, France, and Italy. In 2024, Lynk & Co appointed automobile group SEEAG to expand their business in southeast Europe, starting with Romania and Greece, then followed by Slovenia, Croatia, Bulgaria, Serbia, Bosnia-Herzegovina, Montenegro, North Macedonia, Kosovo, Albania, and Moldova during 2024.

In 2021, Geely announced that the Lynk & Co brand will enter Russia, Malaysia, Australia, and New Zealand by 2025. In May 2023, Lynk & Co entered Middle Eastern markets, starting with Kuwait, Oman, Saudi Arabia and Qatar. Lynk & Co debuted in the Philippines in March 2024 through United Asia Automotive Group, Inc. (UAAGI), which is the Philippine distributor.

Since 2018, Lynk & Co has been considering entering the US market. Plans were made to establish a San Francisco headquarters by 2020. However, progress has been minimal. In 2023, the company revealed plans to introduce its first electric vehicle in the US by 2024, utilizing the subscription-based strategy that it already deployed in Europe.

== Products ==
=== Current models ===
- Lynk & Co 01 (2017–present), compact SUV, ICE/PHEV
- Lynk & Co 03 (2018–present), compact sedan, ICE/PHEV
- Lynk & Co 05 (2019–present), compact coupe SUV
- Lynk & Co 06 (2020–present), subcompact SUV, ICE/PHEV
- Lynk & Co 07 (2024–present), mid-size sedan, PHEV
  - Lynk & Co 07 GT (2026–present), station wagon variant
- Lynk & Co 08 (2023–present), mid-size SUV, PHEV
- Lynk & Co 09 (2021–present), mid-size SUV, ICE/PHEV
- Lynk & Co 10 (2025–present), full-size sedan, BEV/PHEV
- Lynk & Co 20 (2024–present), compact SUV, BEV
- Lynk & Co 900 (2025–present), full-size SUV, PHEV
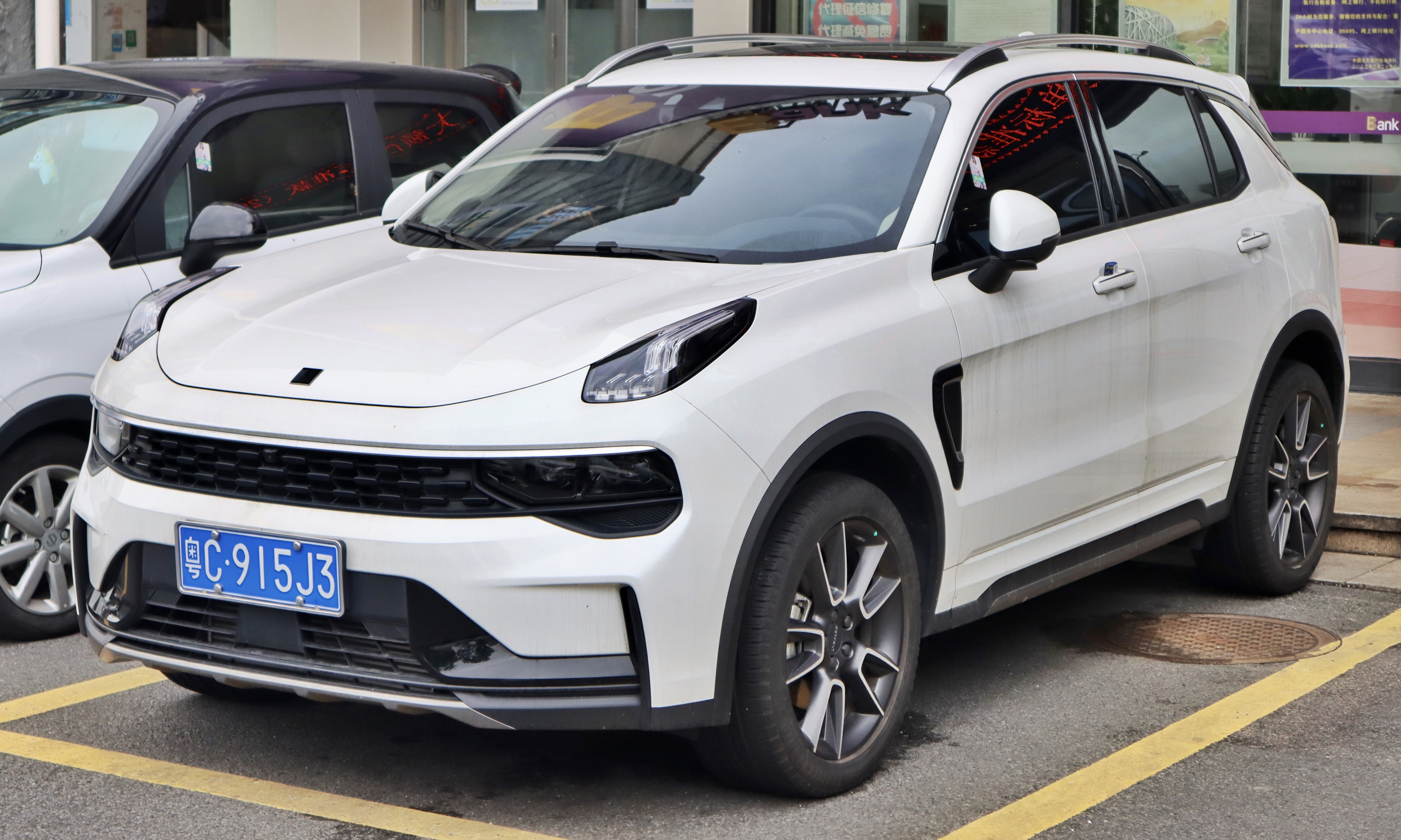
Lynk & Co 01

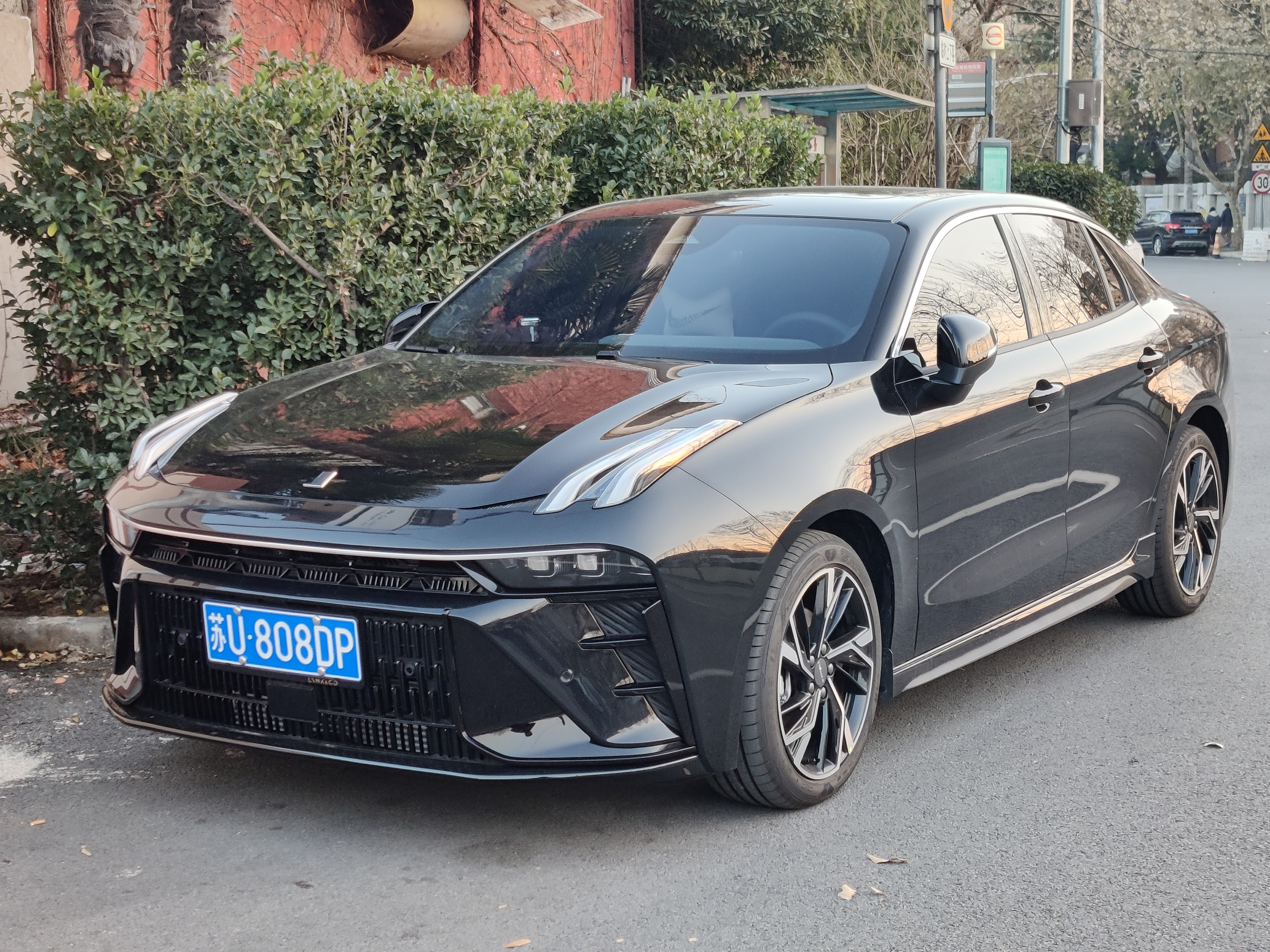
Lynk & Co 03

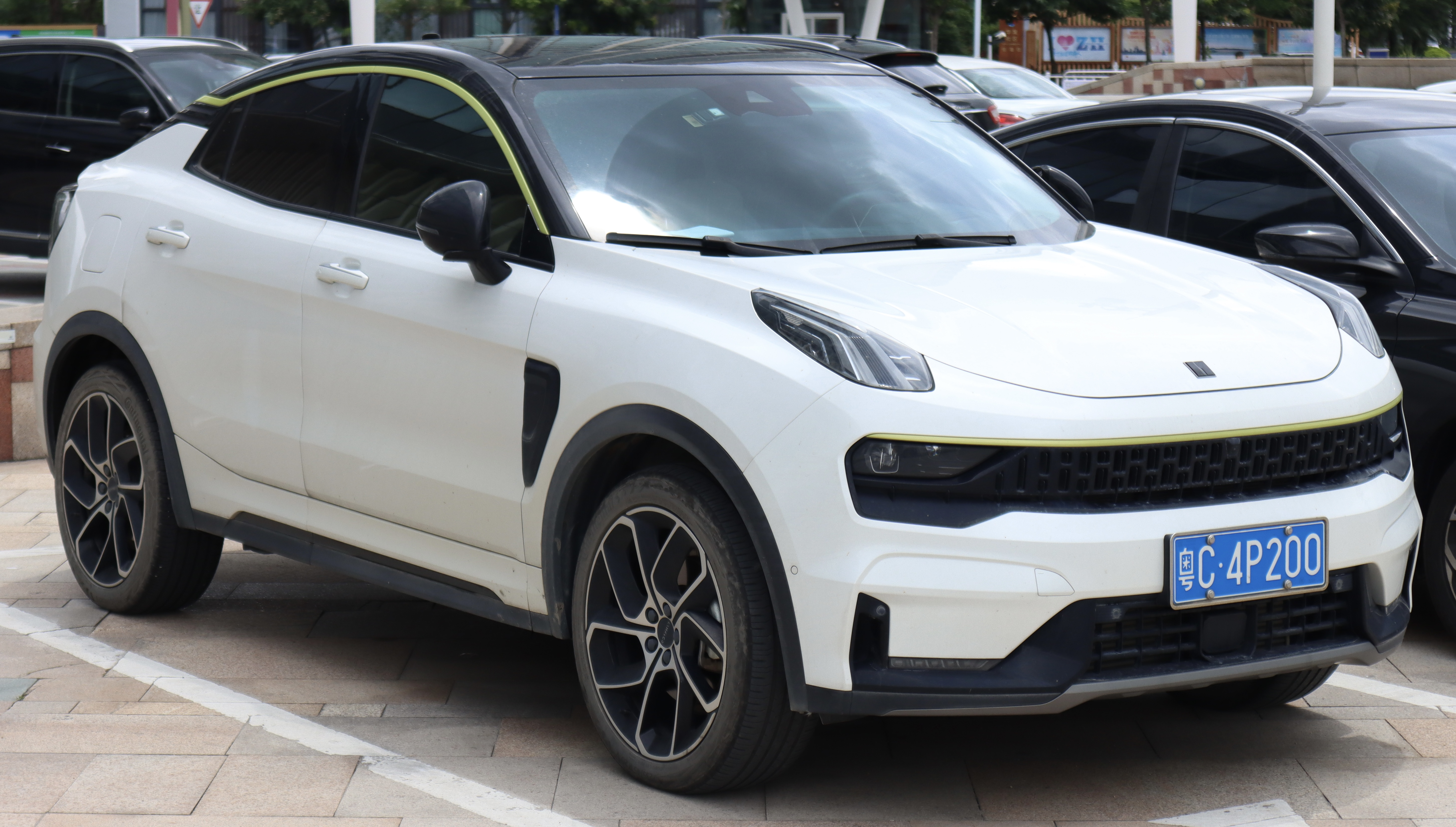
Lynk & Co 05

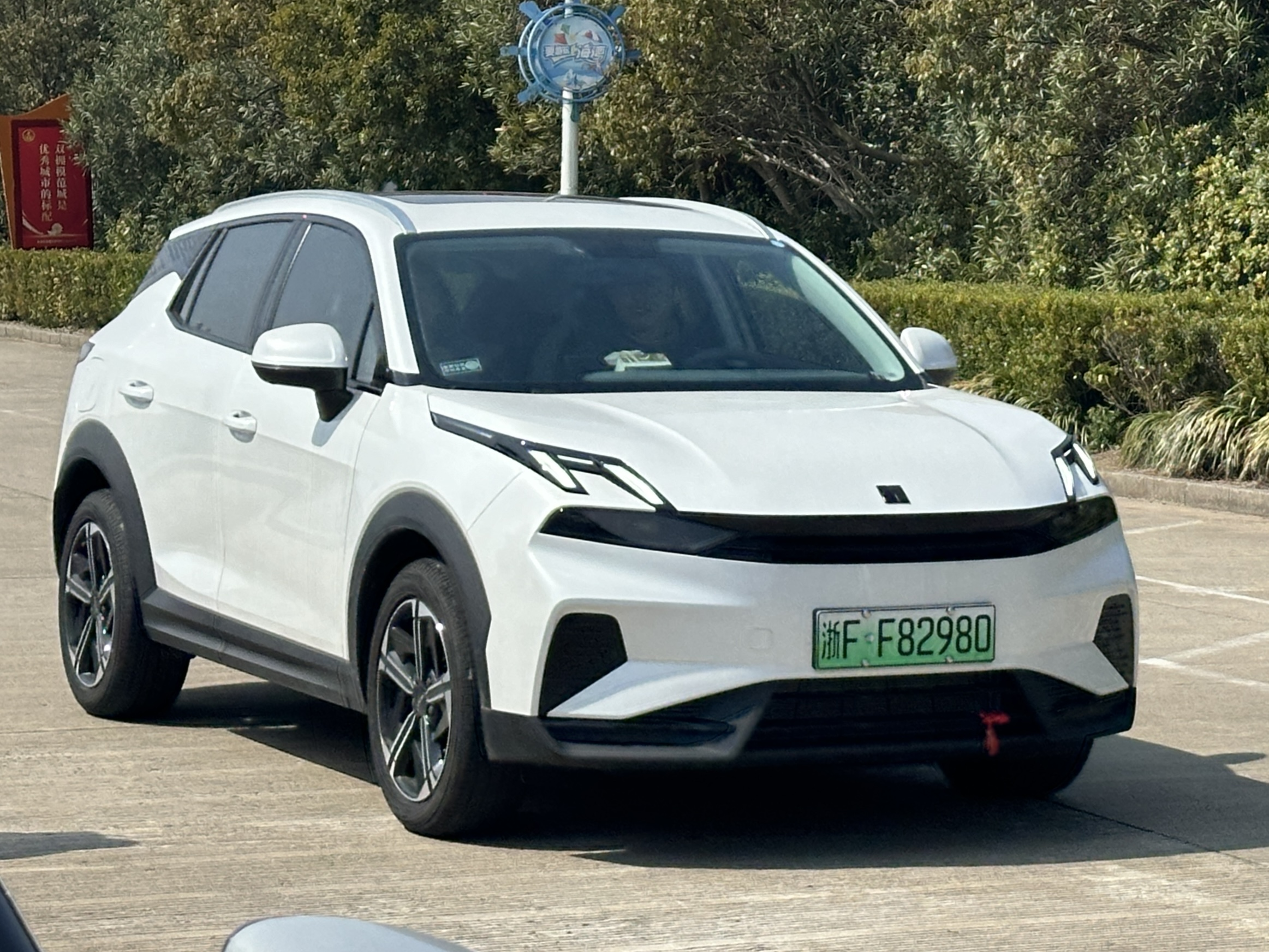
Lynk & Co 06 EM-P

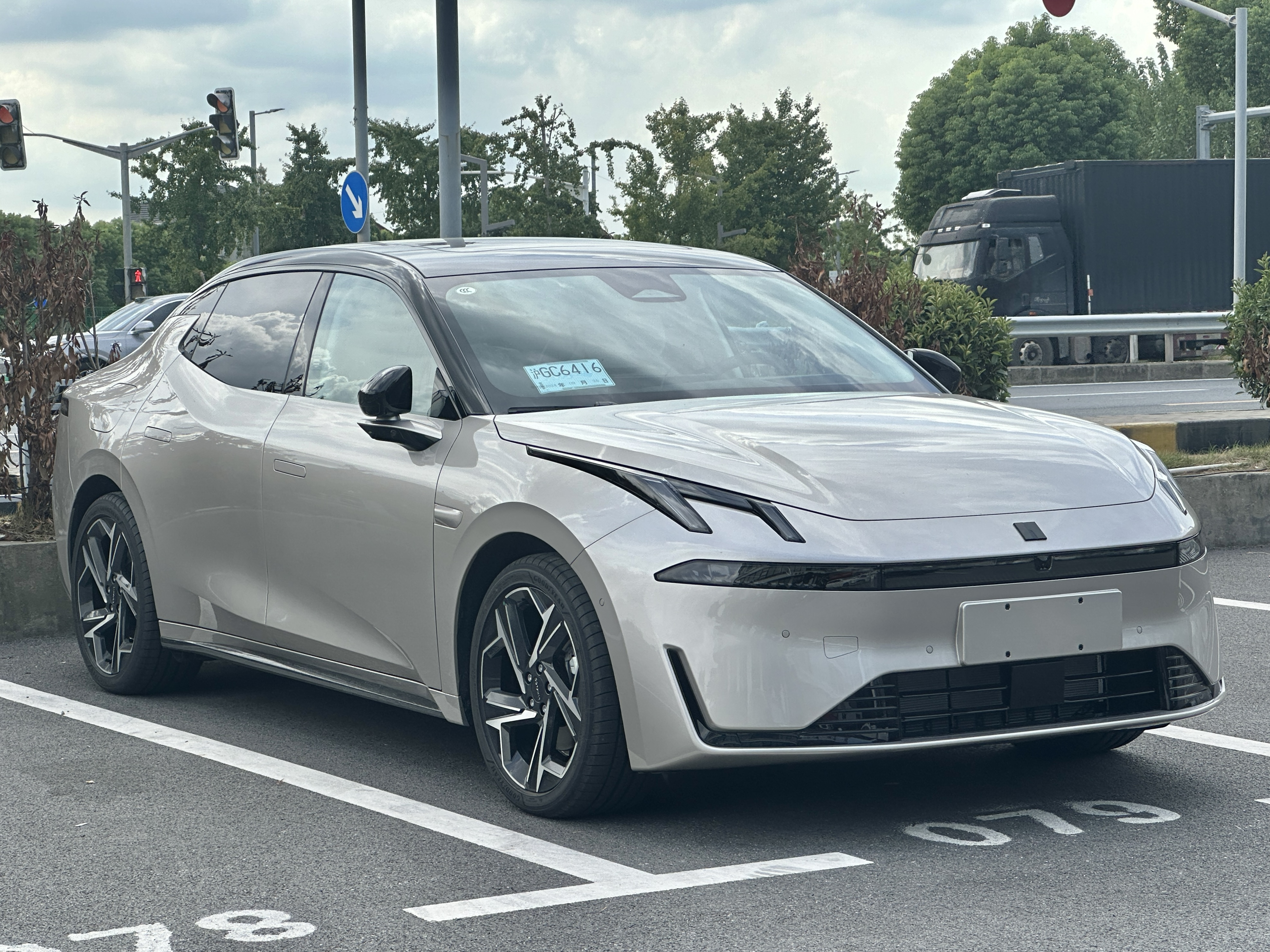
Lynk & Co 07 EM-P

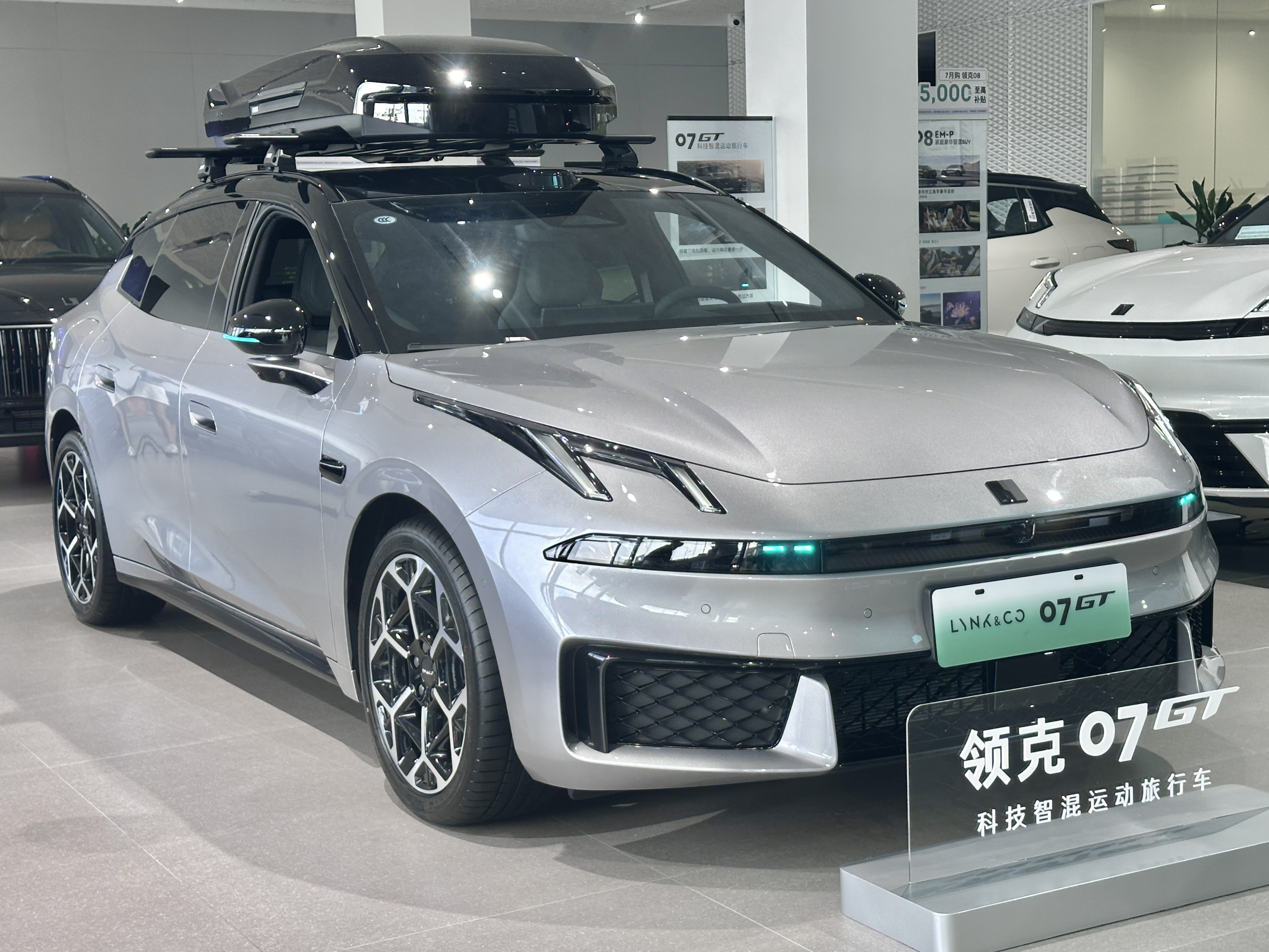
Lynk & Co 07 GT

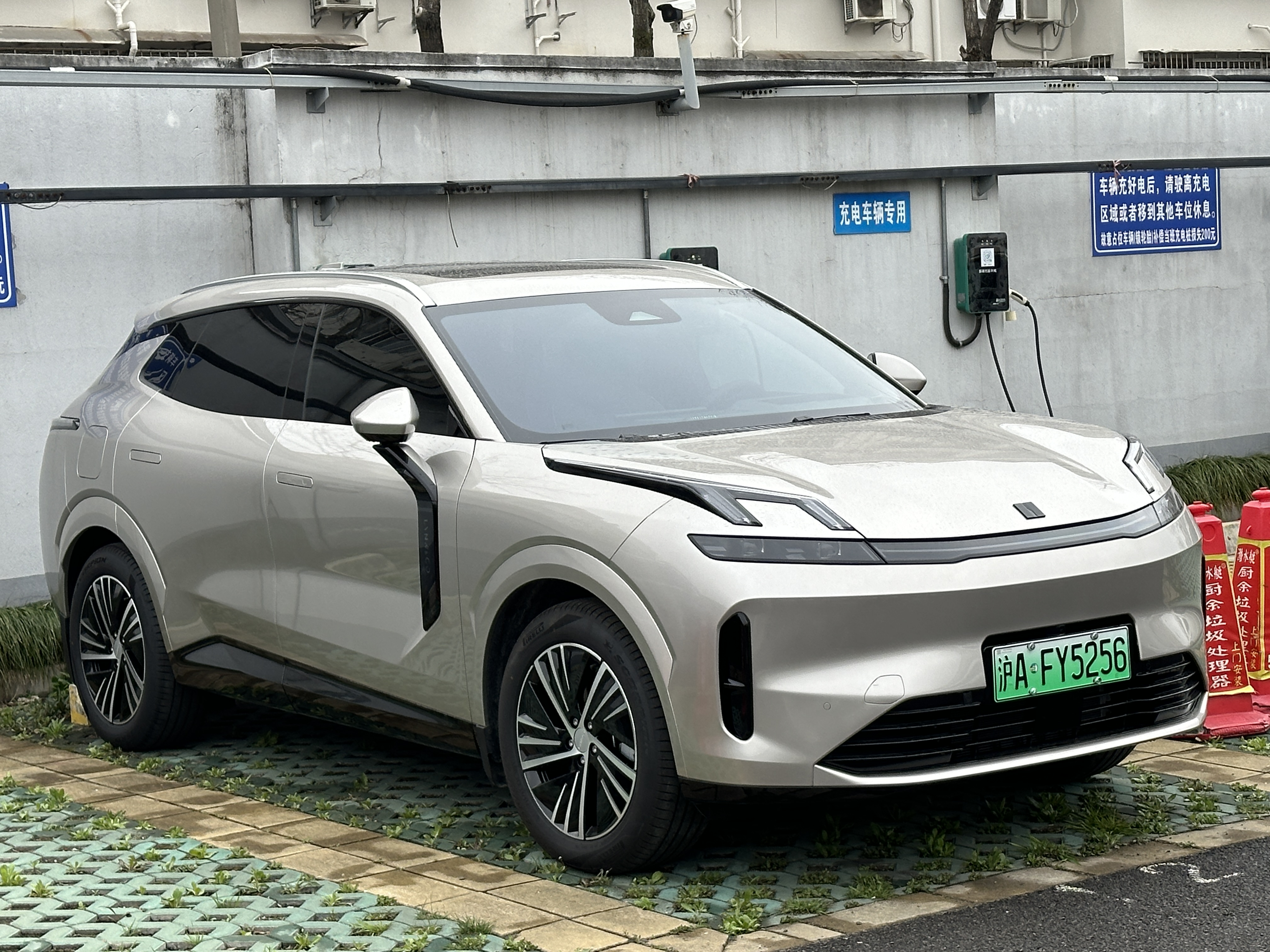
Lynk & Co 08 EM-P

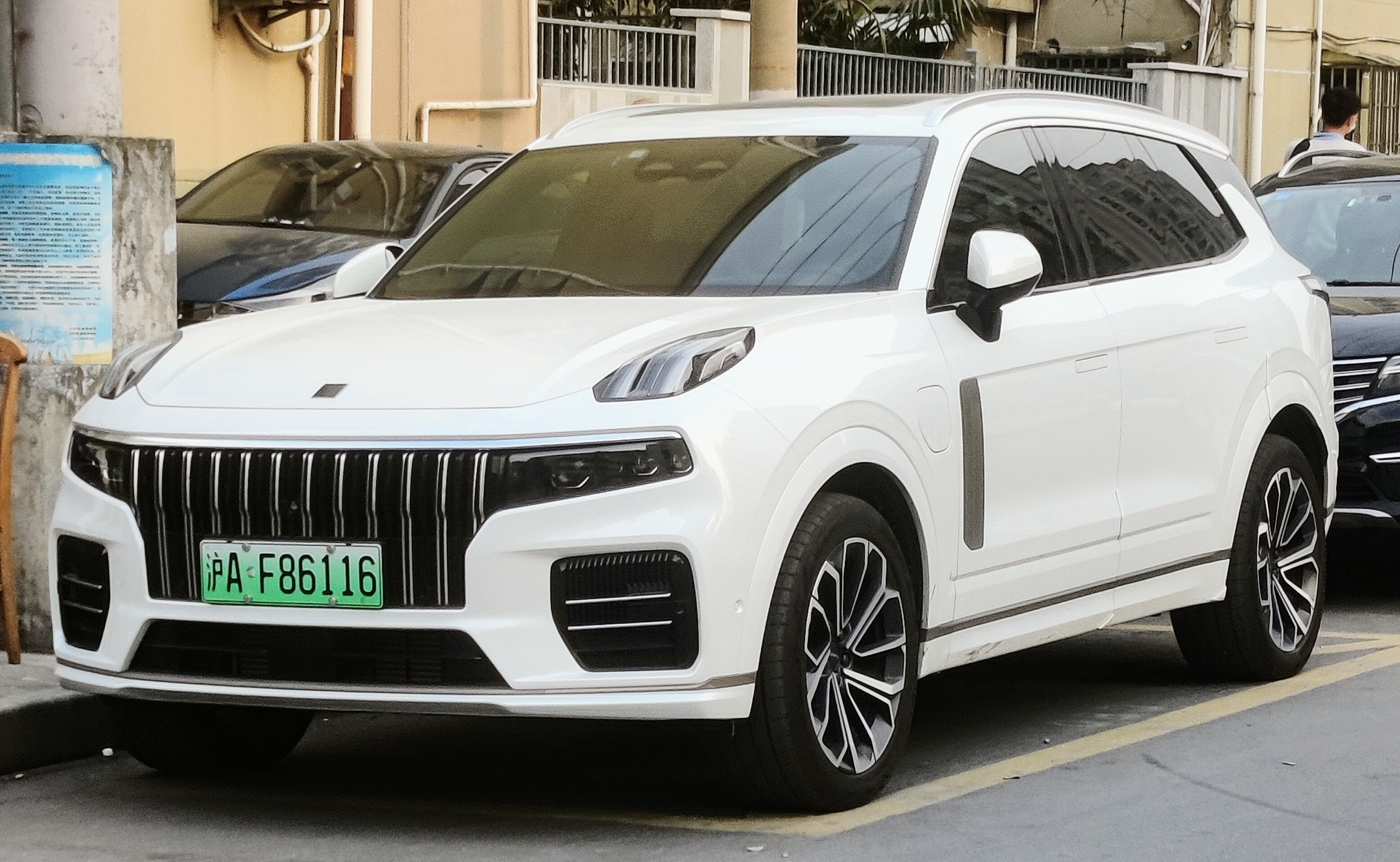
Lynk & Co 09

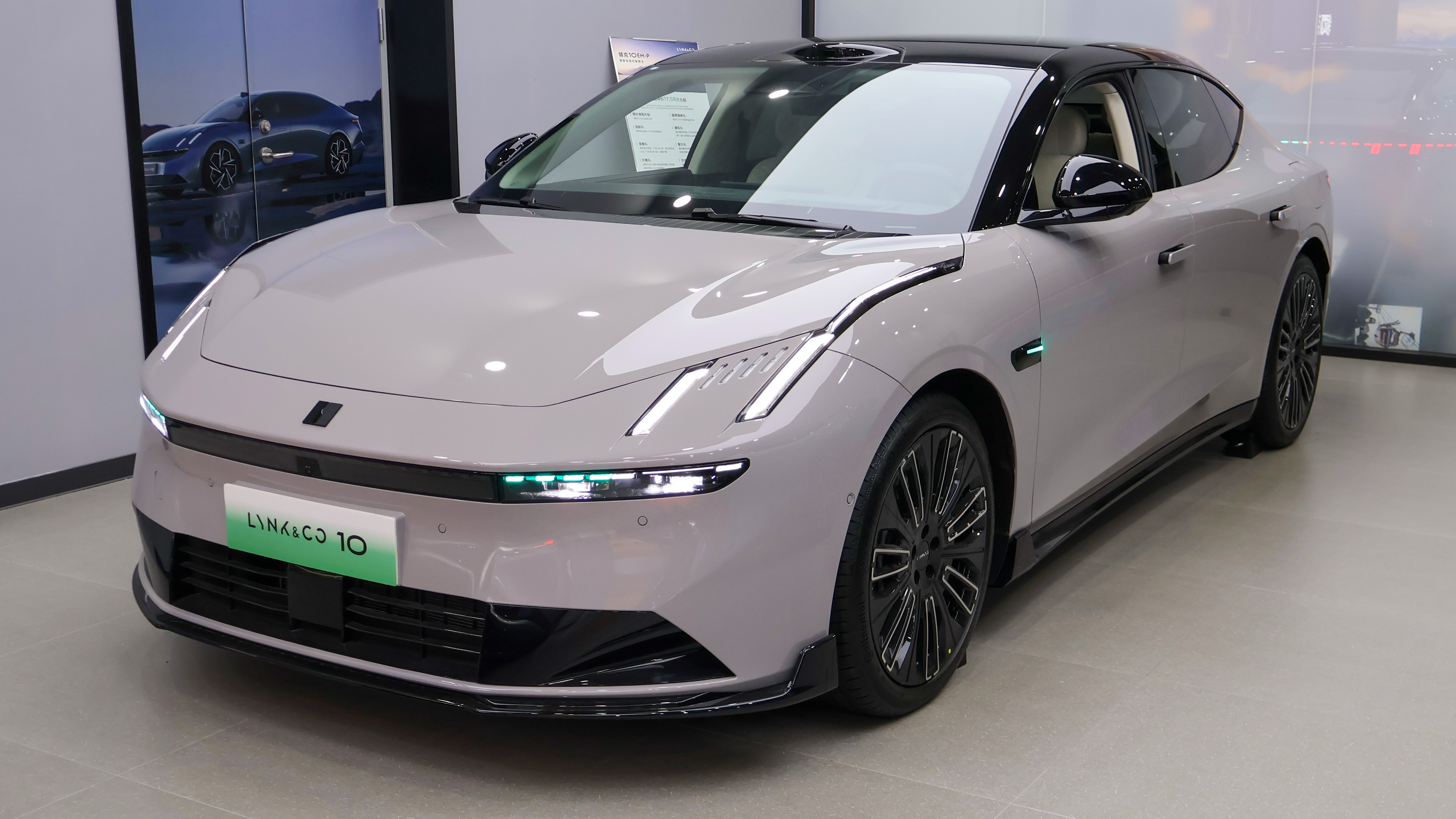
Lynk & Co 10

Lynk & Co 20

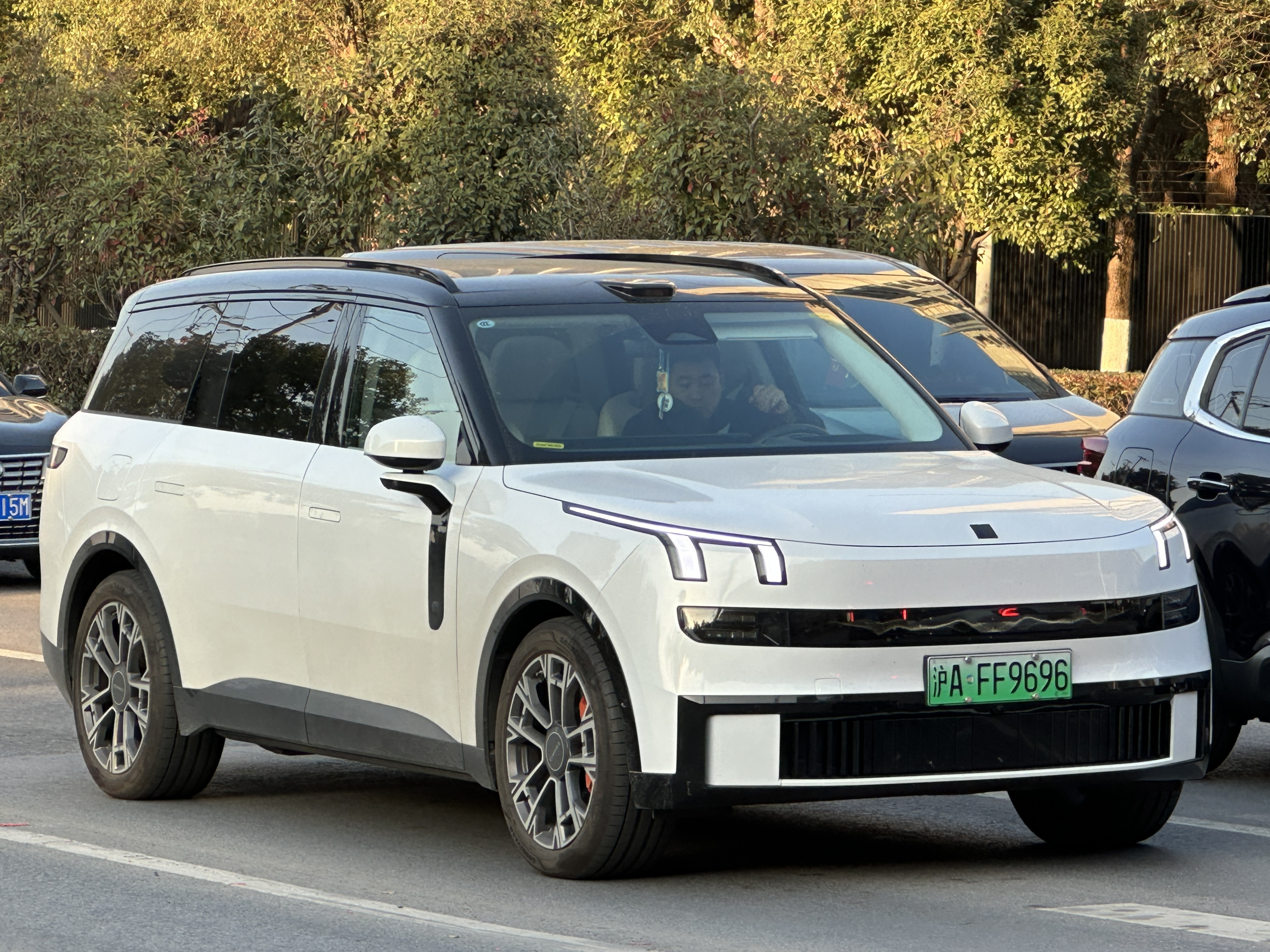
Lynk & Co 900

=== Discontinued models ===
- Lynk & Co 02 / 02 Hatchback (2018–2023), compact hatchback/SUV
- Lynk & Co Z10 (2024–2026), full-size sedan, BEV
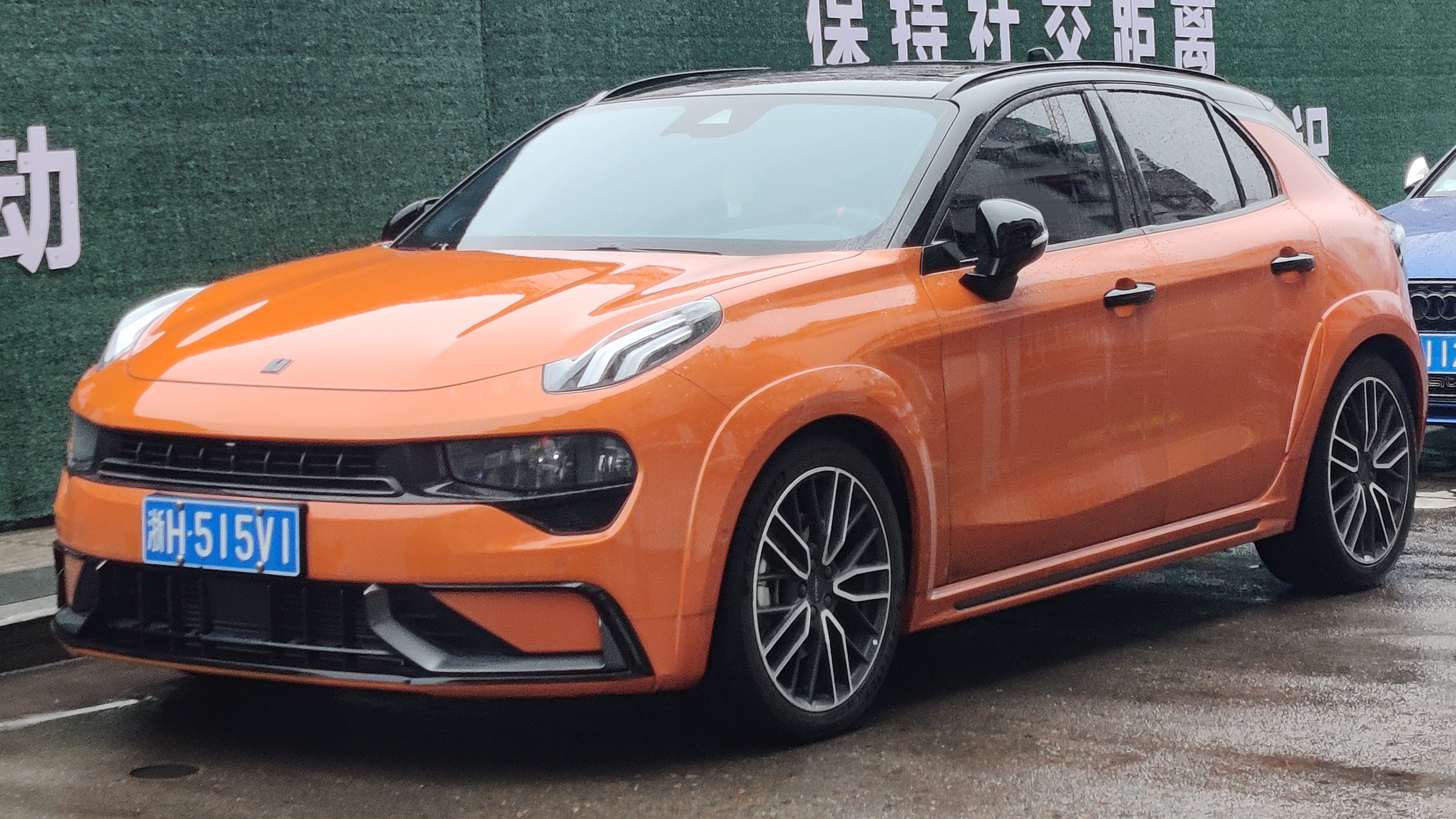
Lynk & Co 02

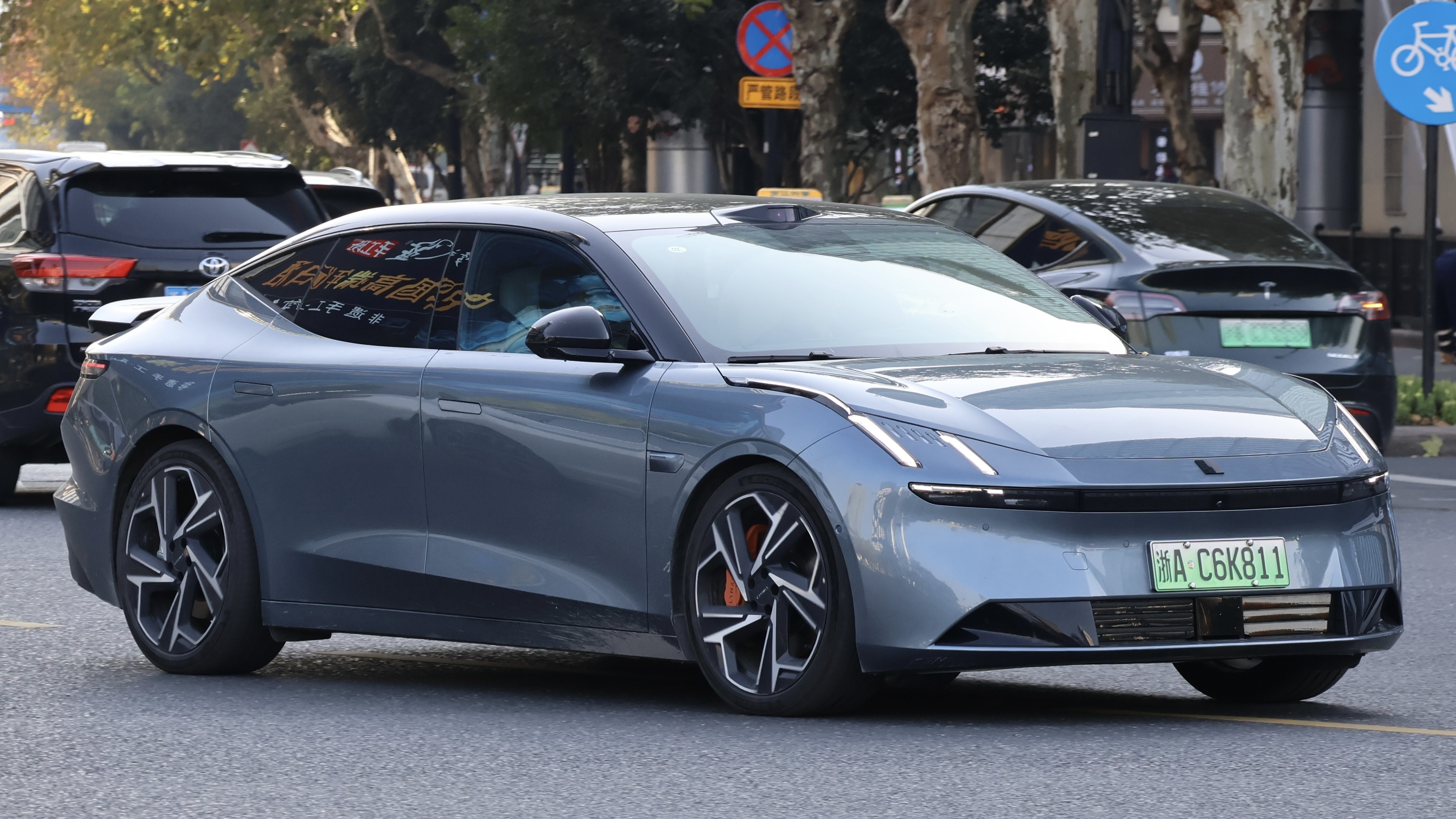
Lynk & Co Z10

== Motorsport ==
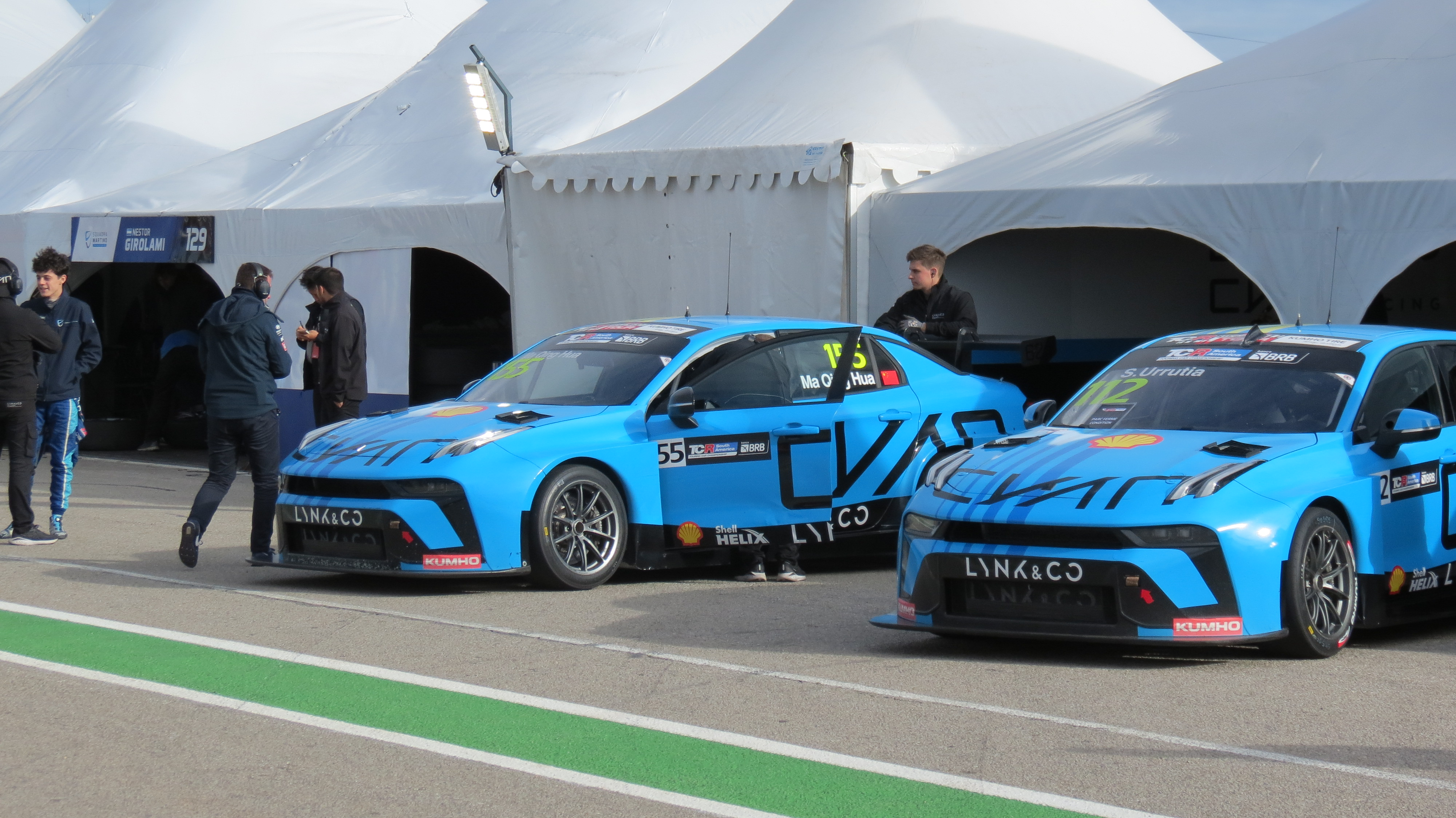
Lynk & Co 03 TCR of Cyan Racing in the 2023 TCR World Tour

Since 2019, Lynk & Co has sponsored Cyan Racing (formerly Polestar Racing) and entered the WTCR World Touring Car Cup (now the TCR World Tour), becoming the first Chinese brand to take part in an FIA championship. The team ran four Lynk & Co cars in the 2019 WTCR, claiming the teams' title and Yvan Muller finishing third in the drivers' championship.

== Sales ==
| Year | Sales |
|---|---|
| 2017 | 6,012 |
| 2018 | 120,414 |
| 2019 | 128,066 |
| 2020 | 175,456 |
| 2021 | 220,516 |
| 2022 | 180,127 |
| 2023 | 220,250 |
| 2024 | 285,441 |
| 2025 | 350,495 |

== See also ==
- Geely
- Geely Auto
- Zeekr
- Volvo Cars
- Polestar
- Zeekr Technology Europe
- Automobile manufacturers and brands of China
- List of automobile manufacturers of China
