= Geely Xingyue =

Geely Xingyue can refer to 2 vehicles by Geely Auto:

- Geely Xingyue S (previously the Geely Xingyue in 2019–2021), a coupe SUV released in 2019, also known as the Geely Tugella outside China
- Geely Xingyue L, an SUV released in 2021, also known as the Geely Monjaro outside China
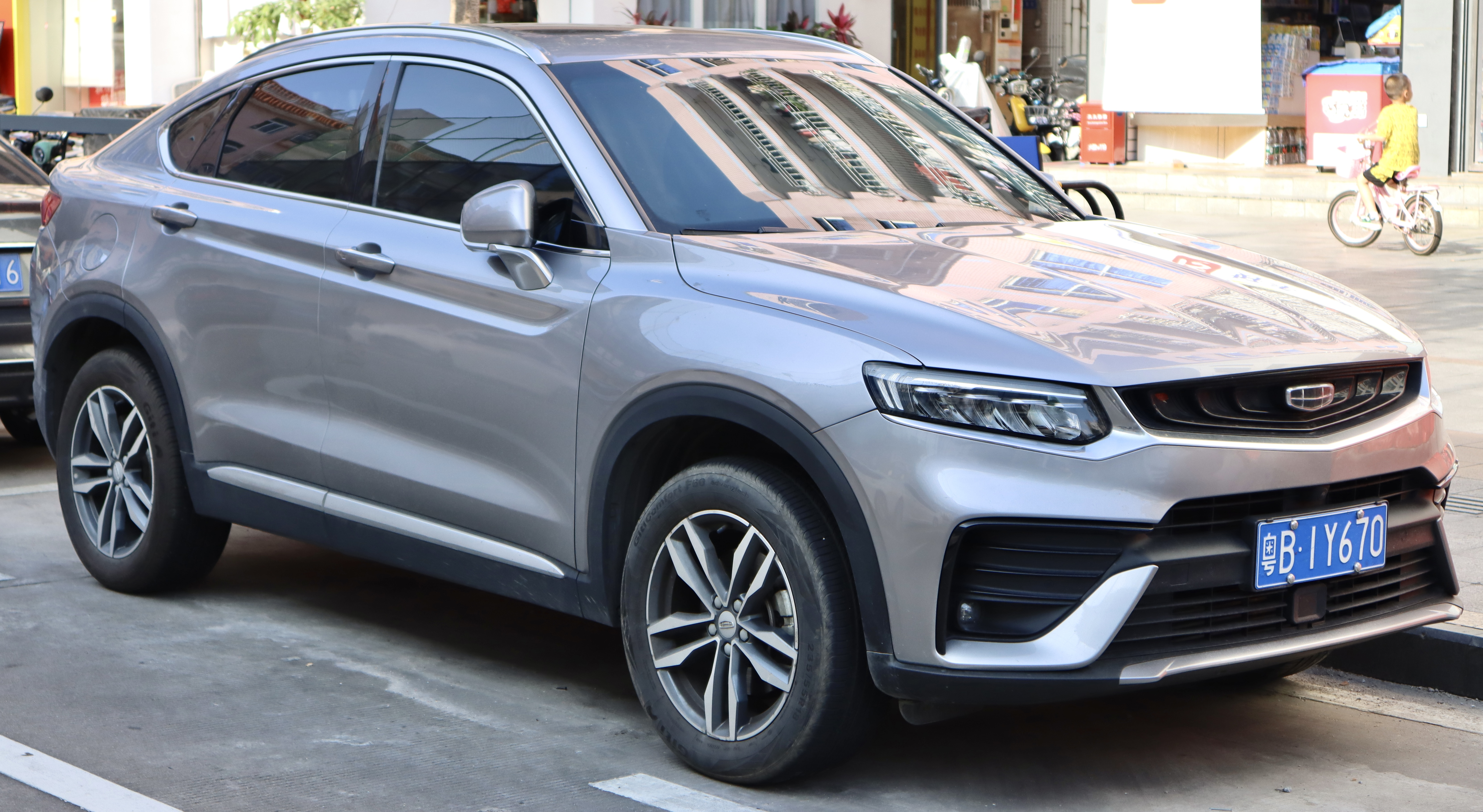
Geely Xingyue S

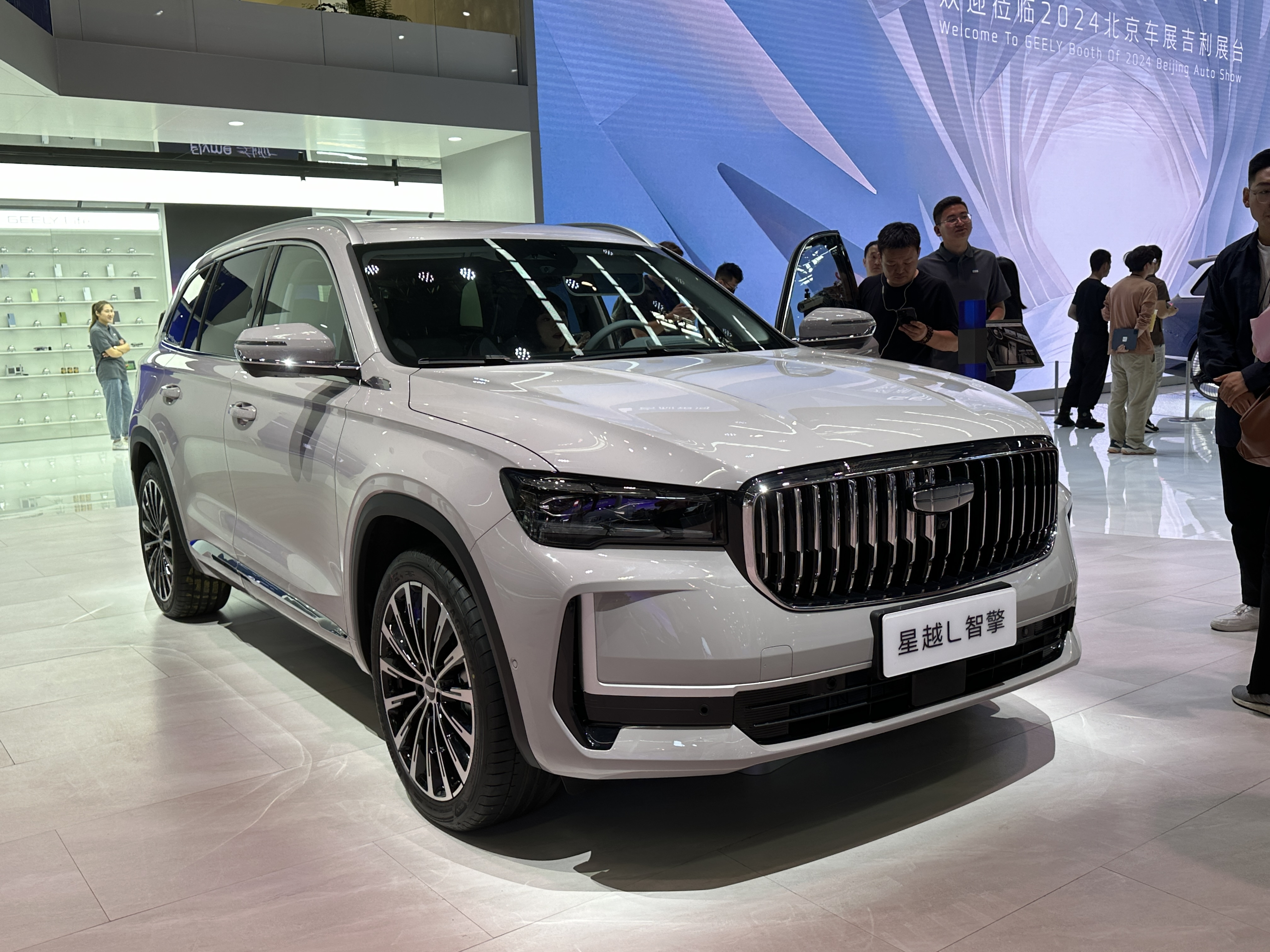
Geely Xingyue L
