= Geely =

Chinese automotive conglomerate

Zhejiang Geely Holding Group Co., Ltd.

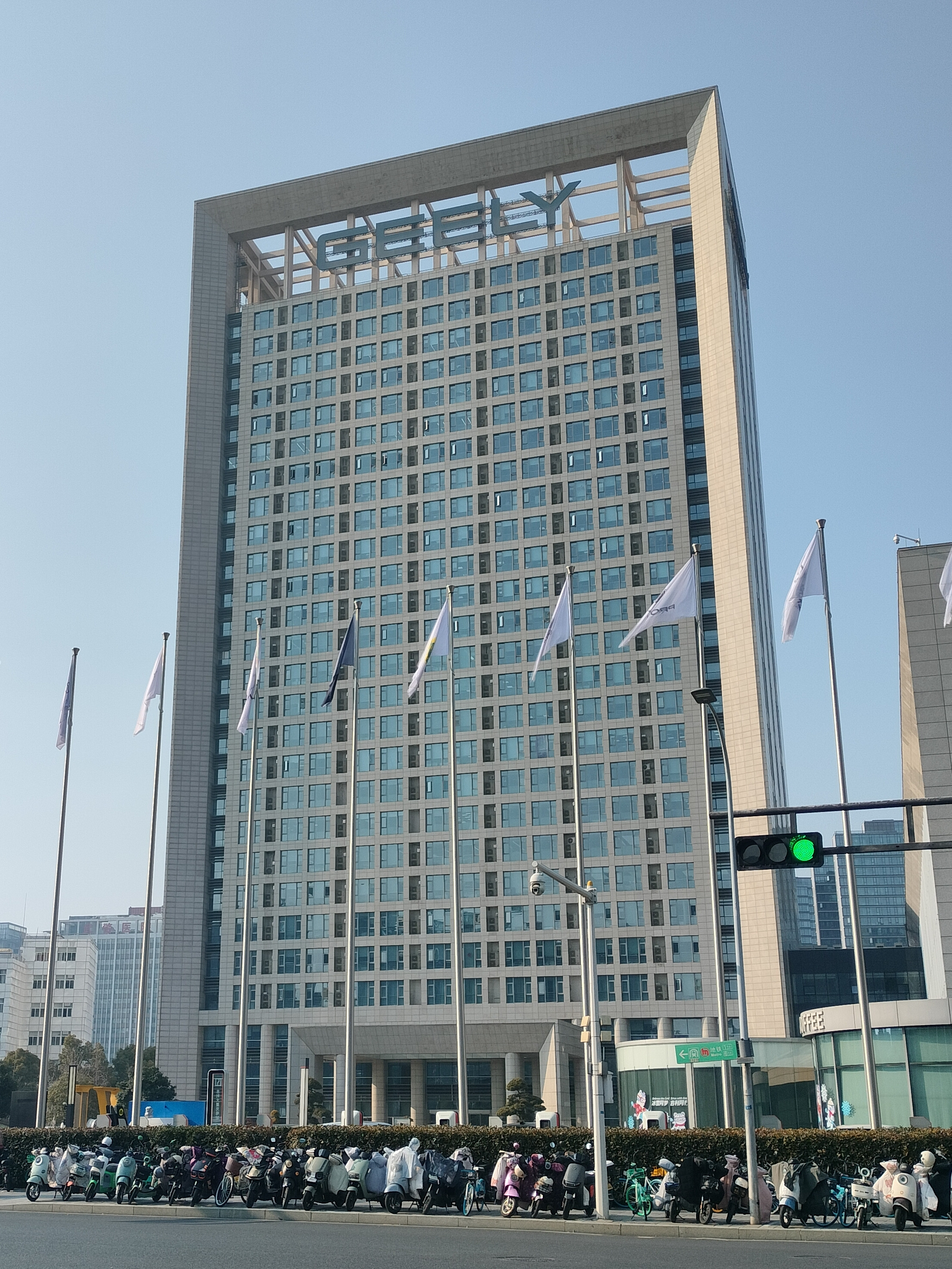
- Headquarters in Hangzhou, Zhejiang
- Type: Private
- Industry: Automotive
- Founded: November 1986; 40 years ago in Taizhou, Zhejiang, China; March 2003; 23 years ago (as ZGH)
- Founder: Li Shufu
- Headquarters: Binjiang District, Hangzhou, Zhejiang, China
- Area served: Worldwide
- Key people: Gan Jiayue (President & CEO); Andy An Conghui (Chairman); Li Shufu (Honorary Chairman)
- Products: Automobiles, motorcycles, engines, transmissions
- Production output: ▲4,116,321 vehicles (2025)
- Revenue: ▲US$50.92 billion (2025)
- Net income: ▲US$2.45 billion (2025)
- Total assets: ▲US$42.83 billion (2025)
- Total equity: ▲US$13.84 billion (2025)
- Owner: Li Shufu
- Number of employees: 131,517 (2022)
- Subsidiaries: List: Automobiles: Geely Auto; Geely Galaxy; Zeekr; Lynk & Co; Radar Auto; LEVC; Proton Holdings (49.9%); Lotus Cars; Renault Korea (34.2%); Horse Powertrain (50%); Livan Automotive; Smart Automobile (50%); Volvo Cars (78.7%); Polestar (48.3%); Aston Martin (17%) Geely Commercial Vehicles: Farizon Auto; Ouling Auto; Hanma Motorcycles: Benelli; Qianjiang Motorcycle; Zhejiang Geely Ming Industrial Others: Aerofugia; Emerald Automotive; Meizu; Terrafugia; E-Energee

Chinese name
- Simplified Chinese: 浙江吉利控股集团有限公司
- Traditional Chinese: 浙江吉利控股集團有限公司
Transcriptions
Standard Mandarin
- Hanyu Pinyin: Zhèjiāng Jílì Kònggǔ Jítuán Yǒuxiàn Gōngsī
- Website: zgh.com
- Footnotes in consolidated financial statement; shareholders' equity figure excluded perpetual bond

Zhejiang Geely Holding Group Co., Ltd. (ZGH), commonly known as Geely Holding (/ˈdʒiːli/ ; Chinese: 吉利控股; pinyin: Jílì Kònggǔ), is a Chinese multinational automotive conglomerate headquartered in Hangzhou, China. The company was founded by, and is privately owned by Chinese entrepreneur Li Shufu.

Geely was founded in 1986 as a refrigerator parts company, before transitioning to motorcycles in 1994 and entering the automotive industry in 1997. ZGH as a holding company was founded in 2003. As of 2023, the company ranks 225 in the 2023 Fortune Global 500 list of the world's largest companies. In 2025, the group produced a total of 4.1 million vehicles globally, including 2.3 million plug-in electric vehicles.

The company manufactures and sells vehicles under the brands of Geely, Lynk & Co and Zeekr, which are part of the Geely Auto Group business unit, with its subsidiaries and joint ventures such as Volvo Cars, Polestar, Proton, Smart, Lotus, and commercial vehicles London EV Company, Radar Auto, and Farizon. It produces motorcycles under its subsidiaries Zhejiang Geely Ming Industrial (Jiming and Geely), Qianjiang Motorcycle (QJMotor and Keeway), and Benelli. It also holds a 17% stake in Aston Martin and owns half of Horse Powertrain, an engine manufacturing joint venture with Renault.

Geely is a phonetic transliteration of the company's native name 吉利 (pinyin: Jílì), which means "auspicious" or "propitious" in Chinese.

== Overview ==
Geely entered the automotive industry in 1997, but only officially received national production license in November 2001. Following a restructuring of Geely, ZGH was established as a holding company largely owned by Li Shufu in March 2003. ZGH acquired the Swedish passenger car maker Volvo Cars from Ford Motor Company in 2010. It completed the acquisition of British taxi maker Manganese Bronze Holdings in 2013 and restructured it into London Electric Vehicle Company. In 2017, ZGH acquired a majority stake in British sports carmaker Lotus Cars.

ZGH's business is divided into five business units: Geely Auto Group which includes the brands Geely Auto, Lynk & Co, and Proton Holdings; Volvo Car Group which includes the brands Volvo Cars and Polestar; Geely New Energy Commercial Vehicle Group which include the brands London Electric Vehicle Company and Yuancheng (Farizon); Geely Group (New Business) which includes the brands Caocao, Terrafugia, Qianjiang Motorcycle, Joma, and other new businesses; and Mitime Group (铭泰集团; Míngtài Jítuán) which includes ZGH educational institutions, motorsports business, and tourism business.

Its global operations span the automotive value chain, from research and development and design to production, sales and service.

Zhejiang Geely Holding automotive divisions
Subsidiary	Business unit	Subsidiaries/brands
Geely Automobile Holdings	Geely Auto Group	Geely Auto; Geely Galaxy; Proton Cars^{(JV)}; Radar Auto; LEVC
Geely Automobile Holdings	Zeekr Group	Zeekr; Lynk & Co
Polestar Automotive		Polestar
Volvo Car Group		Volvo Cars
Lotus Group		Lotus Cars; Lotus Technology
Geely New Energy Commercial Vehicle Group		Farizon Auto; Hanma Technology^{(JV)}; Ou Ling Auto; Green Intelligent Link; Oneworld Technology
Geely Qizheng New Energy Vehicle		Livan
Smart Automobile		Smart^{(JV)}
(JV) = joint venture

== History ==
Geely was established in 1986 in Ningbo, Zhejiang by Li Shufu as a refrigerator parts manufacturer located in Taizhou, Zhejiang. To start the company, Li Shufu had to borrow funds from his family. In 1994, Geely transitioned into the motorcycle industry by acquiring a state-run firm, and started producing China's first scooter.

In 1997, Geely completed the construction of relevant factories and initial investment preparations to enter the automobile industry. This made Geely the first private automobile company in China, whereas other carmakers are state-owned enterprises such as Chery. Geely's first car, the Geely Haoqing, rolled off the assembly line in Linhai, Zhejiang on 8 August 1998. However, Geely did not obtain its national production license until 9 November 2001, which delayed mass production until 2002. By 2002, the brand was ranked among the top ten in the Chinese automobile market.

In 2002, Geely was restructured from being a family-operated entity to a joint-stock company managed by professional management. On 24 March 2003, Zhejiang Geely Holding Group Co., Ltd. (ZGH) was established with a registered capital of CN¥930 million. In January 2004, Li Shufu bought controlling shares in Guorun Holdings Co., Ltd., a company listed on the Hong Kong Stock Exchange under the trading code 0175HK. In March 2004, Guorun was renamed Geely Automobile Holdings Limited, a company under ZGH, retaining the same trading code. This strategy was seen as Geely's "backdoor" entry into the Hong Kong stock market, providing a means to raise funds for the company.

In 2006, Geely bought a 19.97 percent equity stake in British company Manganese Bronze Holdings, the manufacturer of London black cabs. Both companies started a £53 million joint venture to produce the black cabs in China, with Geely holding 52 percent and the British company 48 percent. The company has since reduced costs by producing parts in China. In February 2013, ZGH fully acquired Manganese Bronze Holdings for £11.04 million, after the British company entered administration due to lack of funding. ZGH established a new company under its British subsidiary called The London Taxi Corporation, later renamed London Electric Vehicle Company, to resume assembly of the London black cab in Coventry, UK.

In 2009, Geely bought an Australian transmission company Drivetrain Systems International (DSI), at that time the second largest automatic transmission manufacturer for A$70 million. In 2014, Geely sold 90% of its stake in DSI to multiple other Chinese companies after the company suffered losses.

=== Purchase of Volvo Cars (2008–2010) ===
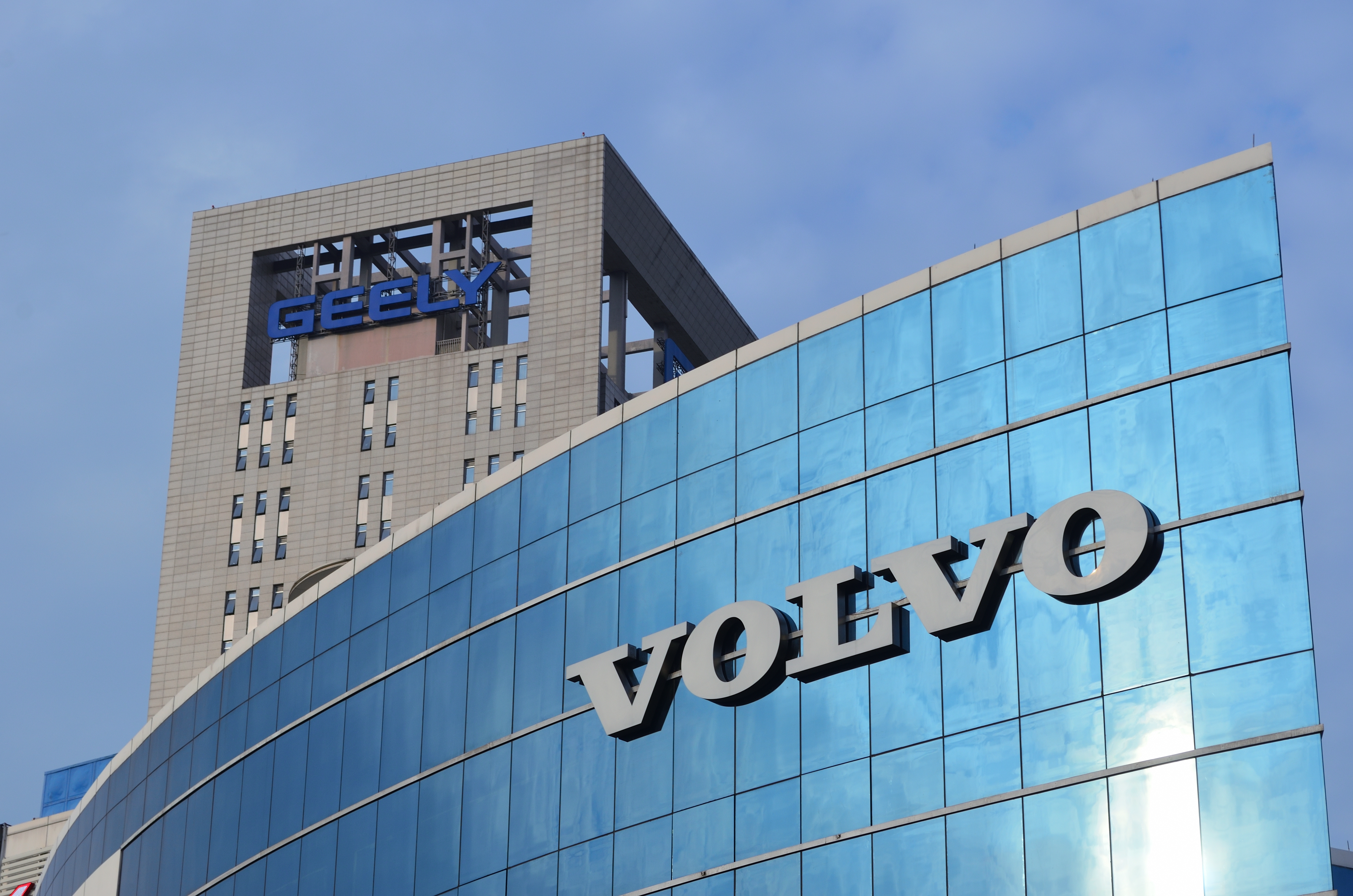
Volvo Cars Chinese headquarter in Hangzhou, next to Geely's headquarter

Following continuing losses in that year, Ford Motor Company put Volvo Cars up for sale in December 2008. On 28 October 2009, Ford confirmed that, after considering several offers, the preferred buyer of Volvo Cars was ZGH. On 23 December 2009, Ford confirmed the terms of the sale to ZGH had been settled. A definitive agreement was signed on 28 March 2010 for US$1.8 billion. The European Commission and China's Ministry of Commerce approved the deal on 6 and 29 July 2010, respectively. The deal closed on 2 August 2010, with Geely paying $1.3 billion in cash and a $200 million note. At the time of the purchase, it was the largest overseas acquisition by a Chinese automaker.

This acquisition facilitated Volvo's recovery and brought significant technological and managerial advancements to Geely. Under Geely ownership, Volvo Cars has developed a new line of 3- and 4-cylinder diesel and petrol engines to replace larger engines. It has also developed a new vehicle platform named the Scalable Product Architecture platform (SPA). Sales reached 500,000 vehicles in 2015 for the first time in the brand's history and grew to over 700,000 in 2023. Both companies jointly developed engines and platforms, notably the Compact Modular Architecture (CMA) platform that is used by Volvo, Geely, and Lynk & Co vehicles. Improving technical expertise and a sophisticated production management system led to a significant sales surge for Geely from 2010 onwards.

=== Further acquisitions and brand establishments (2016–present) ===
In October 2016, Geely Auto released its new brand called Lynk & Co in Berlin, Germany, which is intended to bridge the gap between Geely and Volvo brands. The brand was launched with three production models, all based on the Compact Modular Architecture (CMA). In August 2017, ZGH, Geely Automobile Holdings and Volvo Car Group signed an agreement at Geely Auto's Hangzhou Bay R&D Center to establish the Lynk & Co joint venture. Geely Auto controls 50% of Lynk & Co, Volvo Cars held 30%, and ZGH held the remaining 20%.

In May 2017, ZGH purchased a 51% controlling-stake in Lotus Cars from its owner, DRB-HICOM, the largest shareholder of Malaysian carmaker Proton Holdings. The remaining 49% were acquired by Etika Automotive, a holding company of Proton's major shareholder Syed Mokhtar Albukhary. Proton had owned Lotus since 1996, and largely struggled to turn the fortunes of the sports carmaker around. ZGH also purchased a 49.9% stake in Proton Holdings, which was agreed on 23 June 2017 and finalised on 29 September 2017. The purchase was seen to facilitate future export growth in right-hand drive markets, and making inroads into the lucrative ASEAN region. Proton confirmed that it would not downsize its workforce following its deal with Geely.

In July 2017, the company purchased Terrafugia, an American maker of flying cars. In November 2017, ZGH announced completion of the Terrafugia acquisition, including approval from all relevant regulators.

In October 2017, Volvo Cars and ZGH announced that Polestar, a performance and tuning brand owned by Volvo Cars, would become a standalone brand focusing on electric cars. Polestar introduced its first product, the Polestar 1 coupé on 17 October 2017. The car was produced at the Polestar Production Centre in Chengdu, China. Following an initial public offering, Polestar shares began trading on the Nasdaq exchange under the symbol PSNY on 24 June 2022.

In December 2017, ZGH invested €3.25 billion into Swedish truck and construction company Volvo Group, a former parent company of Volvo Cars. The deal made ZGH the biggest shareholder by number of shares with an 8.2% stake, and second by voting rights, with 15.6%.

In September 2019, ZGH led a round of private funding for Volocopter that raised $55 million for the company. Volocopter's other private investors also include Daimler AG which owns a stake in the company.

In late July 2020, it was announced that the Xingma Group had agreed to transfer a 15.2% stake of its shares in the Ma'anshan-based heavy truck manufacturer Hualing Xingma to Geely New Energy Commercial Vehicle Group, a wholly owned subsidiary of ZGH. After the transaction, Geely New Energy Commercial Vehicle Group would become the de facto controlling shareholder of Hualing Xingma.

In February 2020, Volvo Cars and Geely started formal discussions about a proposed merger of both businesses. In the existing arrangement, Volvo Cars has been allowed autonomy with its resources despite being fully owned by ZGH. These merger talks were later halted, and 18% of Volvo Cars shares were listed on the Nasdaq Stockholm stock exchange in October 2021.

In March 2021, ZGH launched the Zeekr brand for premium electric vehicles. Its first model, the Zeekr 001 was launched in April 2021, and deliveries began in October 2021. In May 2024, Zeekr filed its initial public offering (IPO) on the New York Stock Exchange. Zeekr raised around US$441 million, making it the largest IPO of a Chinese company since 2021.

In February 2024, Volvo Cars announced its plan to reduce its stake in Polestar by the third quarter of 2024 from currently 48.3% to around 18% by ceding it to ZGH.

==== Shareholding and partnerships with Daimler/Mercedes-Benz (2018–present) ====
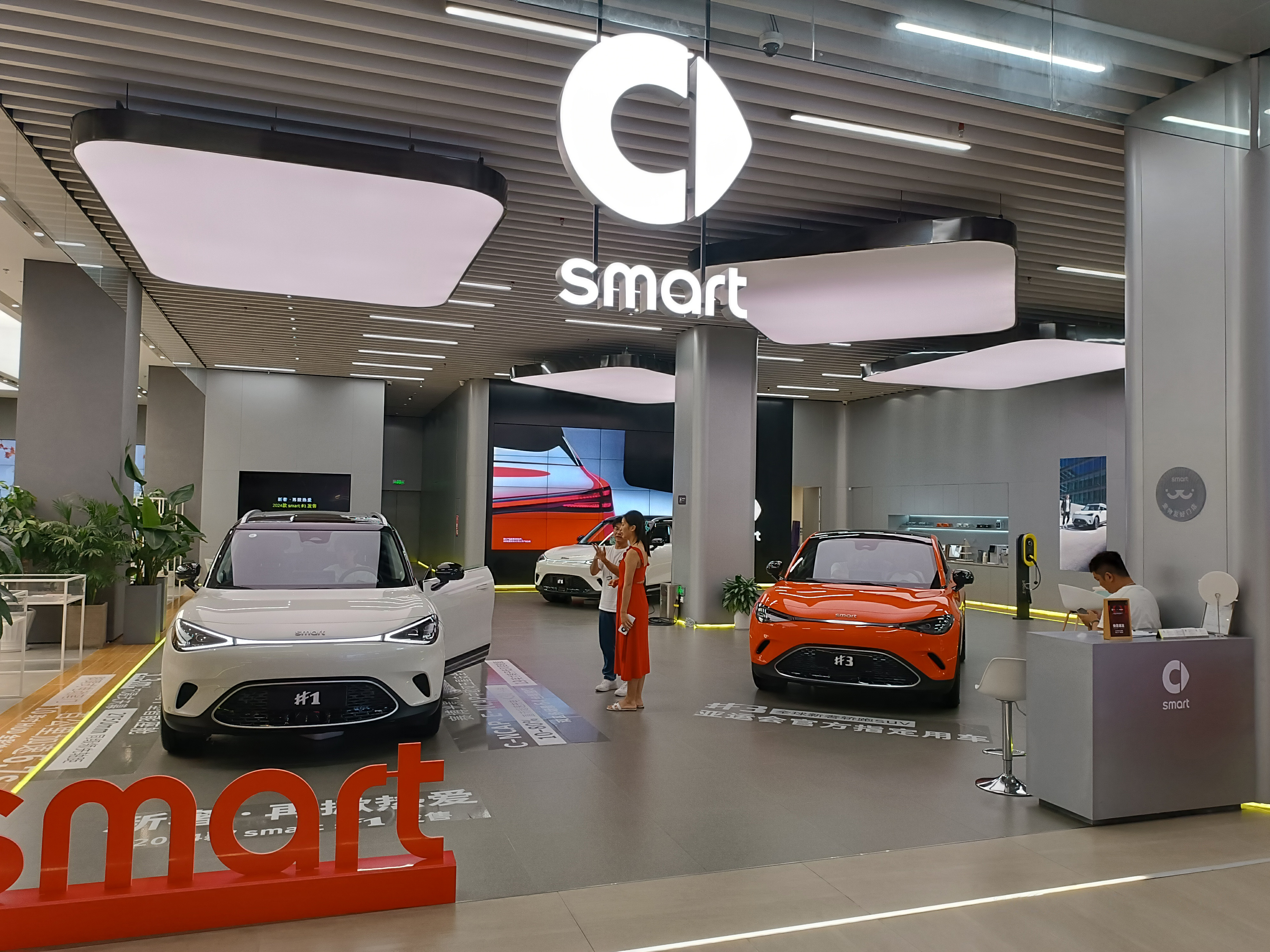
Smart #1 and Smart #3 electric cars in a showroom in a mall in Shenzhen

In 2018, Li Shufu through his investment company Tenaciou3 Prospect Investment Limited purchased a 9.7% stake in Daimler AG (now Mercedes-Benz Group), owner of the Mercedes-Benz and Smart brands. As of 2024, Li Shufu is the second-largest Mercedes-Benz AG shareholder after BAIC Group.

In January 2020, ZGH and Daimler AG announced a 50-50 joint venture to develop and operate the Smart brand as a global electric vehicle brand. The venture, later named Smart Automobile Co., Ltd. is headquartered in Ningbo, Zhejiang. It has a registered capital of CN¥5.4 billion, with each company contributing CN¥2.7 billion. The new all-electric Smart model from this joint venture was launched globally in 2022 as the Smart #1, previously showcased as the Concept #1 at the 2021 Munich Motor Show. Smart electric vehicles from the partnership are based on the Sustainable Experience Architecture (SEA) electric vehicle platform developed by Geely.

In September 2025, Mercedes-Benz Digital Technology acquired 3% of Qianli Technology, Geely's AI and autonomous driving technology solution company, at a price of RMB 1.34 billion. Upon completion of the transaction, Mercedes-Benz will become the fifth largest shareholder of Qianli Technology.

==== Renault partnerships (2021–present) ====
In August 2021, ZGH through its subsidiary Geely Auto formed a strategic partnership with Renault. In January 2022, the two companies signed an agreement by which Renault's South Korean subsidiary, Renault Korea Motors, would produce vehicles based on Geely Compact Modular Architecture platform,

In May 2022, Renault said a Geely subsidiary was set to acquire a 34% stake of Renault Korea Motors through capital increase as part of their partnership, although the company would continue to be majority owned by Renault and a consolidated subsidiary of it.

In November 2022, Renault said it plans to combine its powertrain production and development operations (including internal combustion engines and hybrid systems) with Geely's into a joint venture holding company with both as co-owners. The joint venture was officially established in late May 2024 as Horse Powertrain Limited, headquartered in London, United Kingdom.

In February 2024, Renault and Geely announced a framework agreement to expand their strategic collaboration in the production and sale of electric vehicles in Brazil. Under the agreement, Geely Holding Group will invest in Renault do Brasil, acquiring a minority stake in the company. This investment will grant Geely access to localized production, sales, and service resources in Brazil, enhancing its presence in the region.

In June 2025, Geely Auto, Geely Holding and Renault announced to establish a joint venture to manufacture electric vehicle in Brazil. The JV company would be owned 73.57% by Renault, 21.29% by Geely Auto, 5.11% by Geely Holding, and 0.03% by an independent third party. The company would produce and distribute vehicles under the Renault and Geely brands in Brazil, with shared distribution infrastructure and a nationwide dealer network.

==== Baidu partnership ====
In January 2021, ZGH announced a deal to create an electric vehicle joint venture together with Baidu, a Chinese multinational technology company specializing in Internet-related services, products, and artificial intelligence (AI). Baidu would develop the electric car's software while Geely would manufacture the car. The companies formed Jidu Auto in the same year, combining elements of both company names. Later, in August 2023, they launched the Ji Yue brand, with Geely owning 65% and Baidu 35%. Ji Yue is a subsidiary of Geely Group that was formed to circumvent restrictions on car manufacturing qualifications. Jidu Auto now focuses on technology solutions, including product design and AI development, for Ji Yue vehicles.

==== Taizhou Declaration and restructuring (2024–present) ====
In September 2024, Li Shufu, the founder of the Geely, announced the "Taizhou Declaration", a new stage of strategic transformation of ZGH that would promote the integration of internal resources, clarify the positioning of each brand, straighten out equity relationships, reduce conflicts of interest and duplication of investment, and improve resource utilization efficiency.

In October 2024, as the first step of the strategy, Geely announced to merge all Geely Geometry dealerships into Geely Galaxy dealership network. In November 2024, ZGH transferred its 11.3% stake in Zeekr Intelligent Technology (Zeekr) to Geely Automobile Holdings (Geely Auto). Geely Auto's shareholding ratio in Zeekr increased to 62.8%. Meanwhile, Zeekr purchased a 20% stake of Lynk & Co from Geely Auto for 3.6 billion yuan and acquire Volvo Cars 30% stake in Lynk & Co for 5.4 billion yuan. This move made Zeekr hold 51% of Lynk & Co in total, while the remaining 49% of Lynk & Co shares continues to be held by Geely Auto. In addition, the electric pickup brand Radar Auto has been consolidated into Geely Auto.

In January 2025, ZGH announced it would consolidate London EV Company into Geely Auto.

In April 2025, the Livan marque was consolidated and became a product line under Geely Auto.

In July 2025, ZGH announced that its subsidiary Geely Auto had officially signed a merger agreement with Zeekr. Geely Auto would acquire all remaining Zeekr shares it does not already own, making Zeekr a wholly owned subsidiary of Geely Auto.

In September 2025, Geely appointed Zhu Ling as the Head of Asia-Pacific Operations at Volvo. Zhu Ling previously served as vice president at Zeekr Intelligent Technology Holding Co., Ltd., marking Geely's official takeover of Volvo Car's business in China and the Asia-Pacific region. Despite the power transition, Volvo Cars stated that there have been no changes to the corporate structure or ownership.

In August 2026, Geely consolidated Lotus Cars into Lotus Technology, an entity listed on Nasdaq, by acquiring the rest of stake from Etika.

==== Ford partnership (2026–present) ====
In July 2026, Geely and Ford announced to establish a manufacturing joint venture at Ford's Valencia plant in Spain. The joint venture will be hold 66 % by Ford and 34% by Geely. By 2028, the joint venture will begin to produce one new Ford Bronco family compact SUV, a Ford-branded SUV model based on the Geely platform and two Geely-branded electric SUVs.

== Automotive divisions and products ==
=== Automobile brands ===
==== Geely ====
Geely Auto is Geely Group's original and mainstream brand, primarily sold in China and select overseas markets. It has an electric vehicle product line, the Geely Galaxy for premium EV/PHEV.

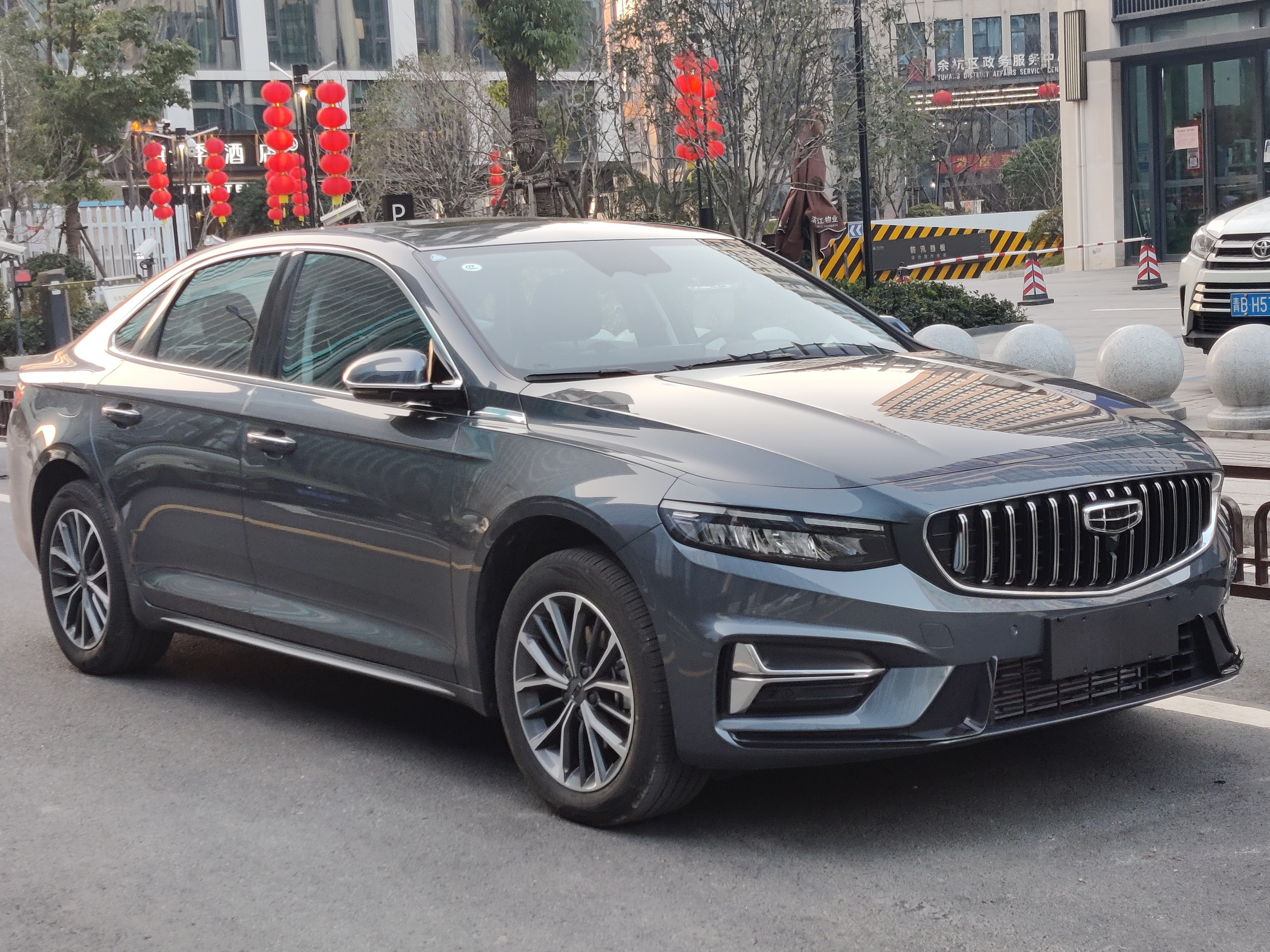
Geely Xingrui

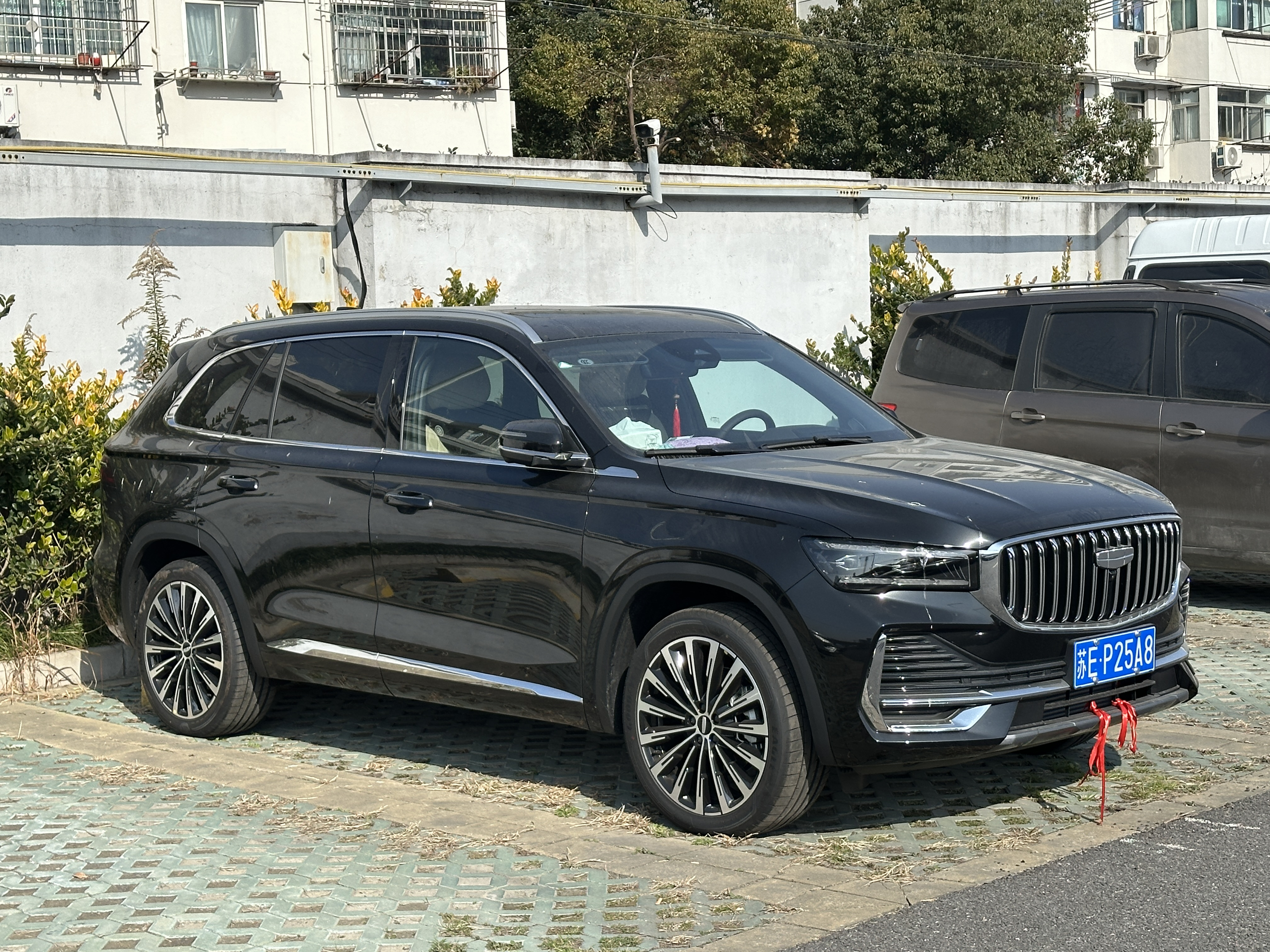
Geely Xingyue L

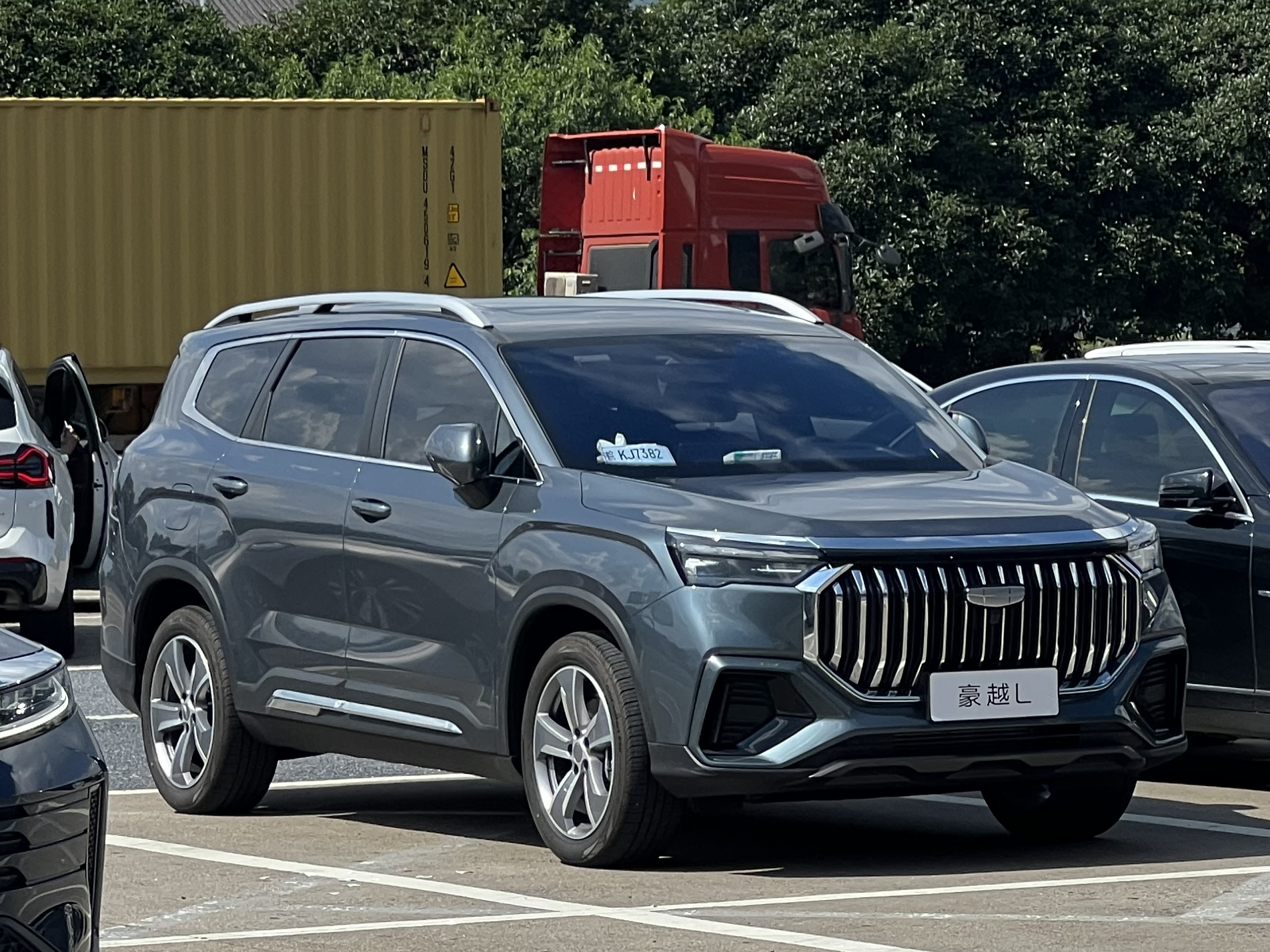
Geely Haoyue

===== Geely Galaxy =====
Geely Galaxy (Chinese: 吉利银河) is Geely's mass-market brand of new energy vehicles (plug-in hybrid and battery electric vehicles) that was established in February 2023. In October 2024, the Geely Geometry line has been merged with Geely Galaxy.

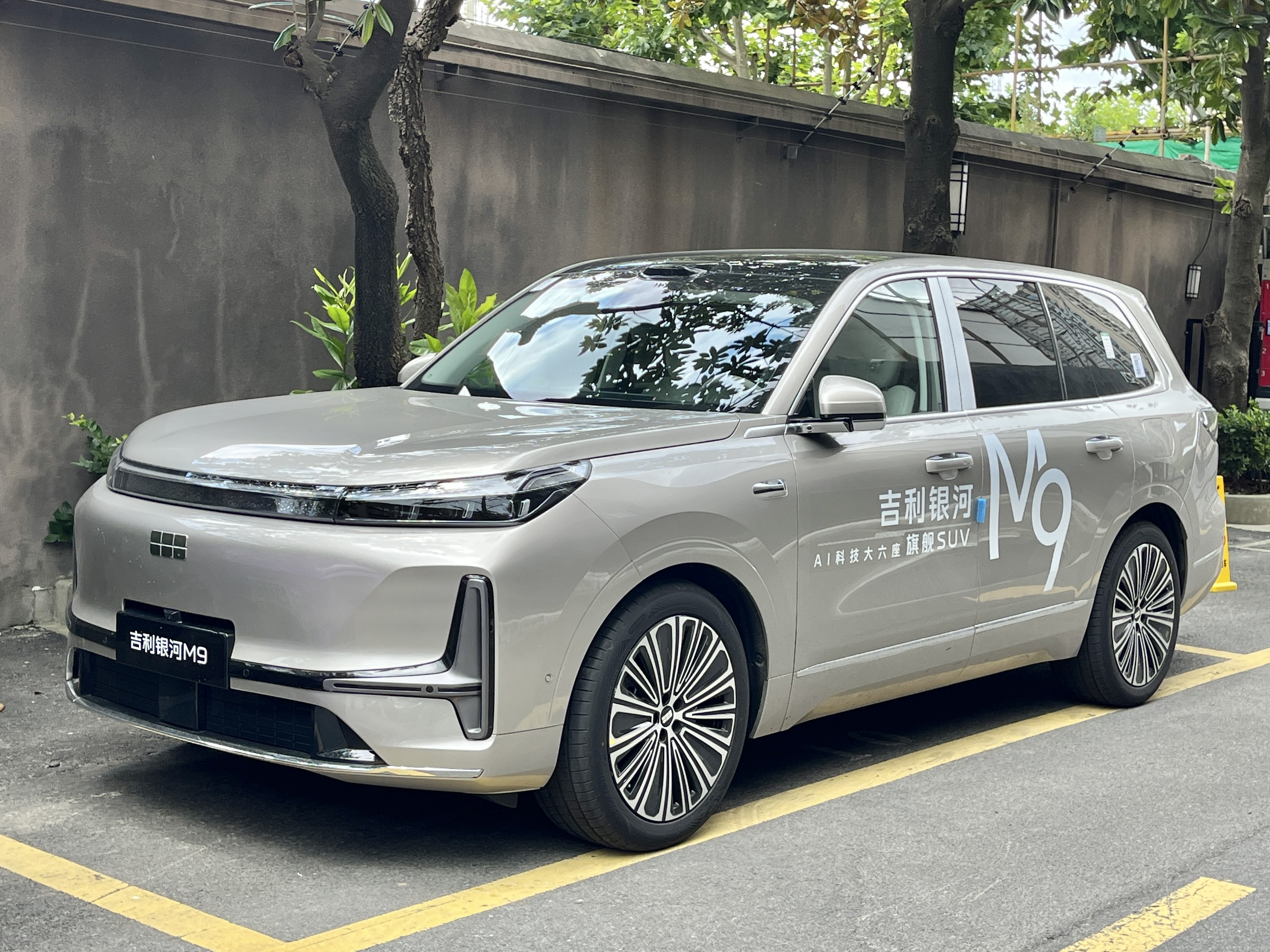
Geely Galaxy M9

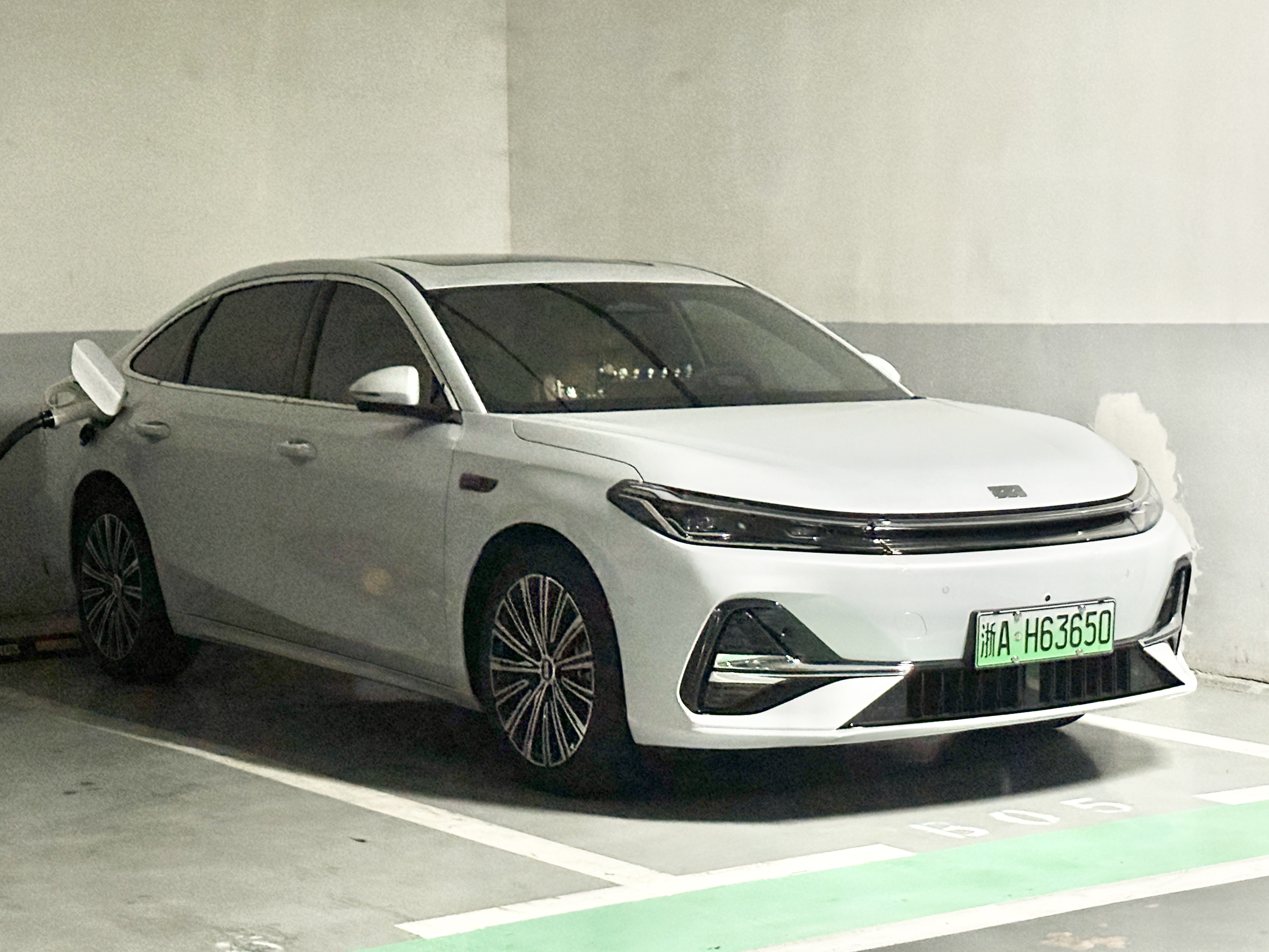
Geely Galaxy A7

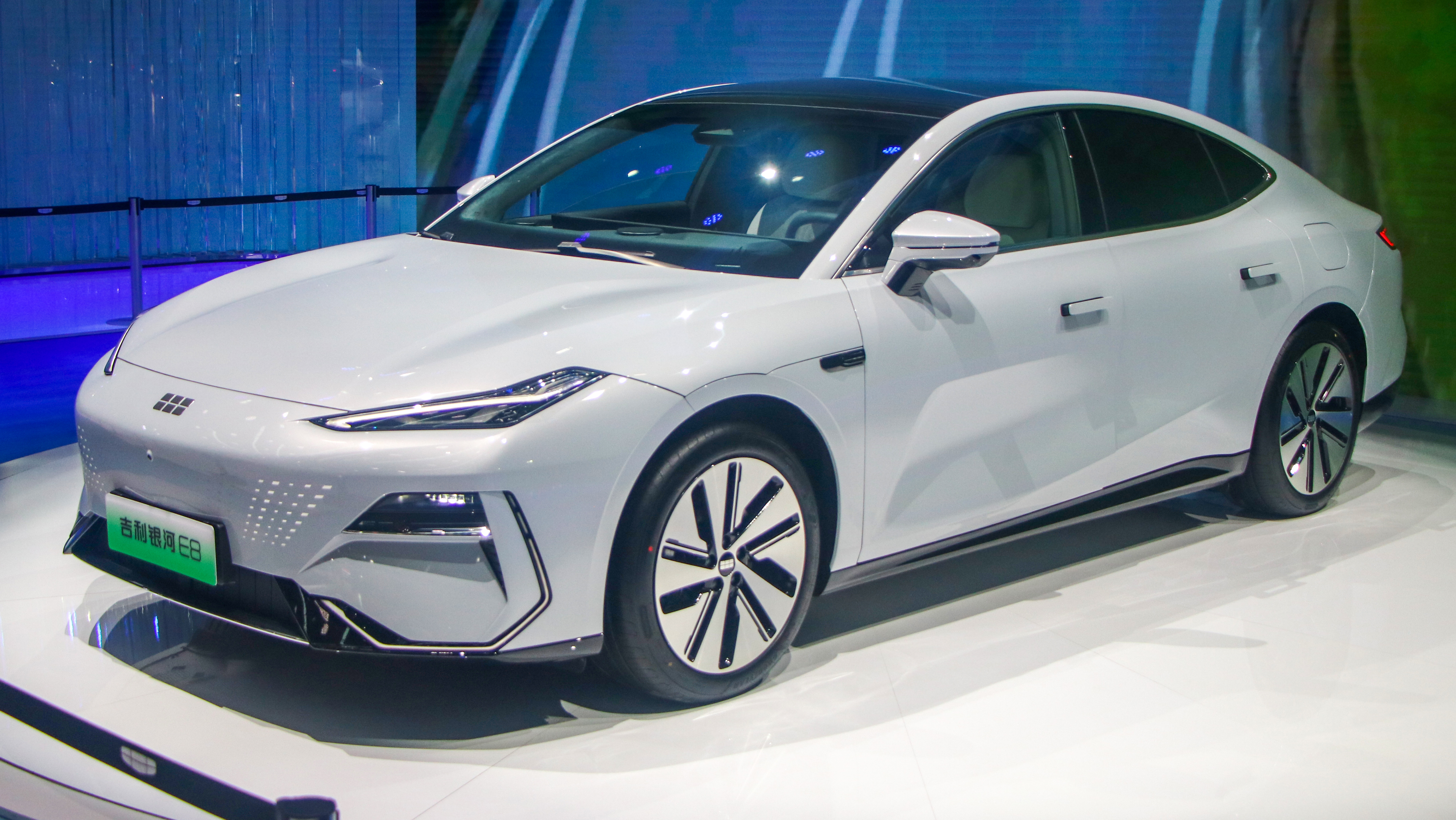
Geely Galaxy E8

===== Geely Radar =====
Geely Radar (Chinese: 吉利雷达), or Riddara outside China, is a battery electric pick-up truck brand owned by ZGH. The brand's first vehicle, the Radar RD6, was unveiled in 2022. The brand was consolidated into Geely Auto in November 2024.

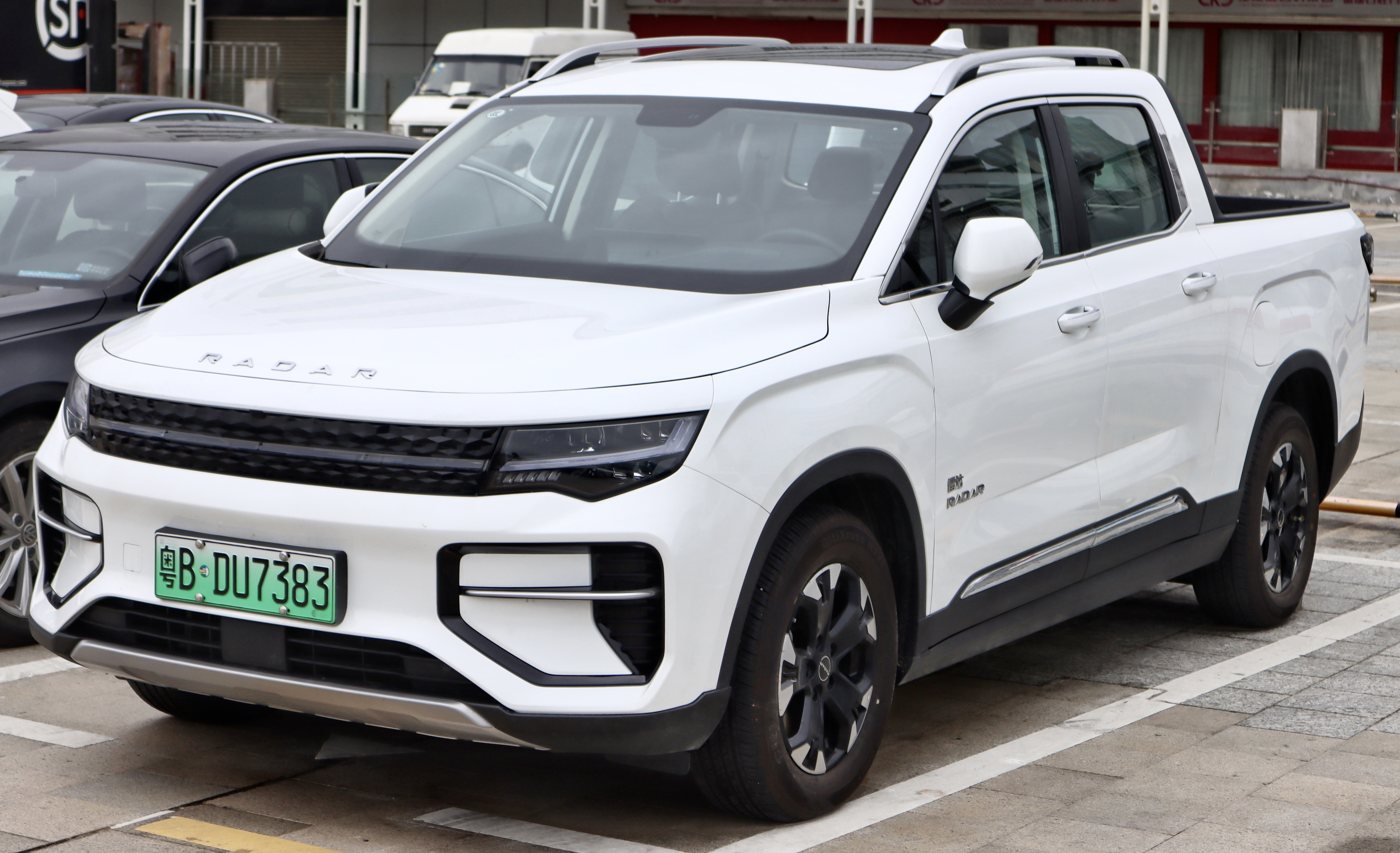
Radar Horizon

===== LEVC =====
London Electric Vehicle Company (LEVC) is a brand owned by ZGH that produces and sells electric black cabs. It adopted its current name in 2017 to reflect its new mission of developing and producing electric commercial vehicles. It was formerly named The London Taxi Company, which has roots from Manganese Bronze Holdings, the original manufacturer of black cabs that Geely acquired in 2013. With a new factory in Ansty Park, near Coventry, it has begun production of a new generation of zero-emission-capable new taxi vehicle in late 2017.

In February 2025, the LEVC has been consolidated into Geely Galaxy.

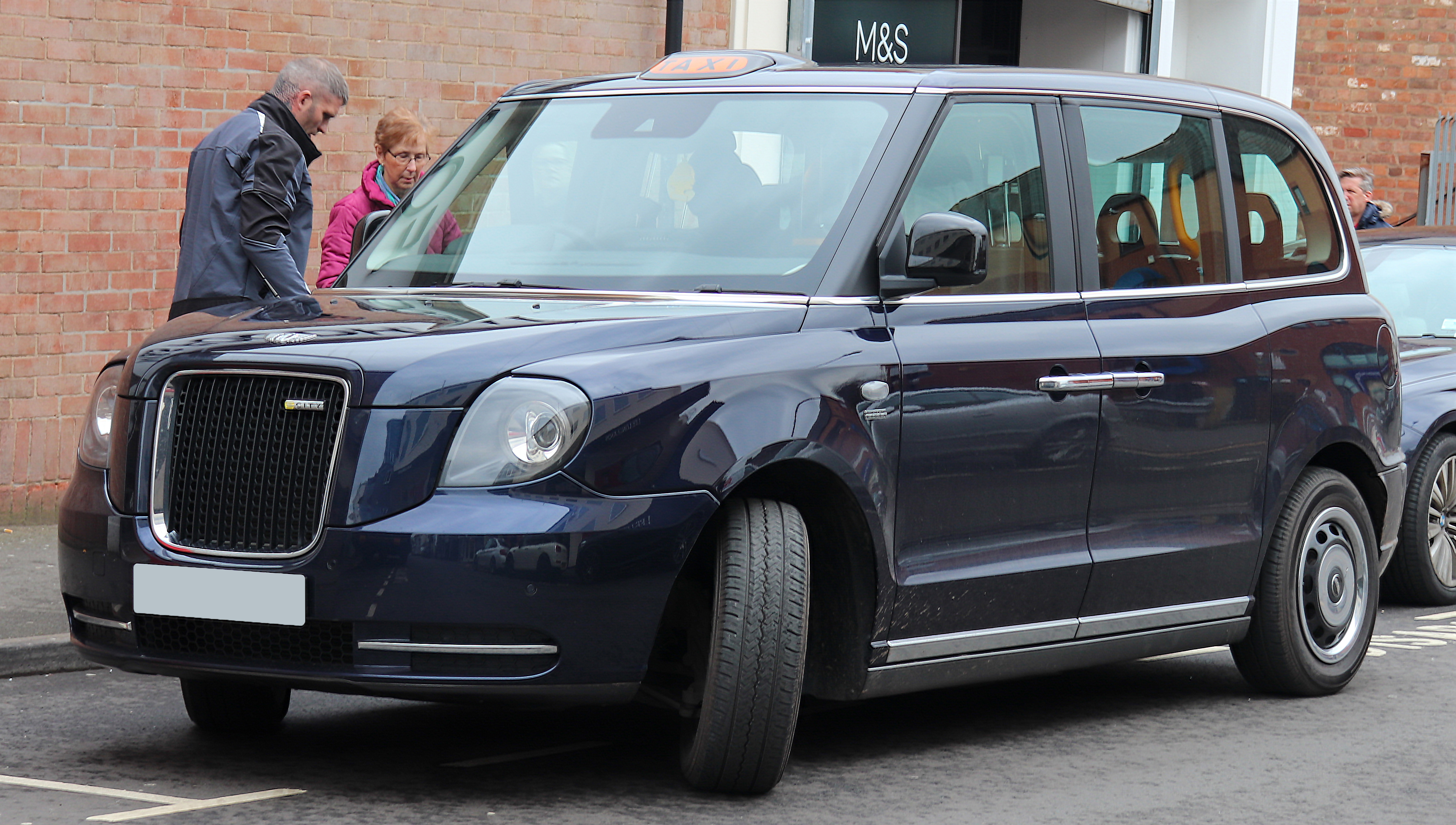
LEVC TX

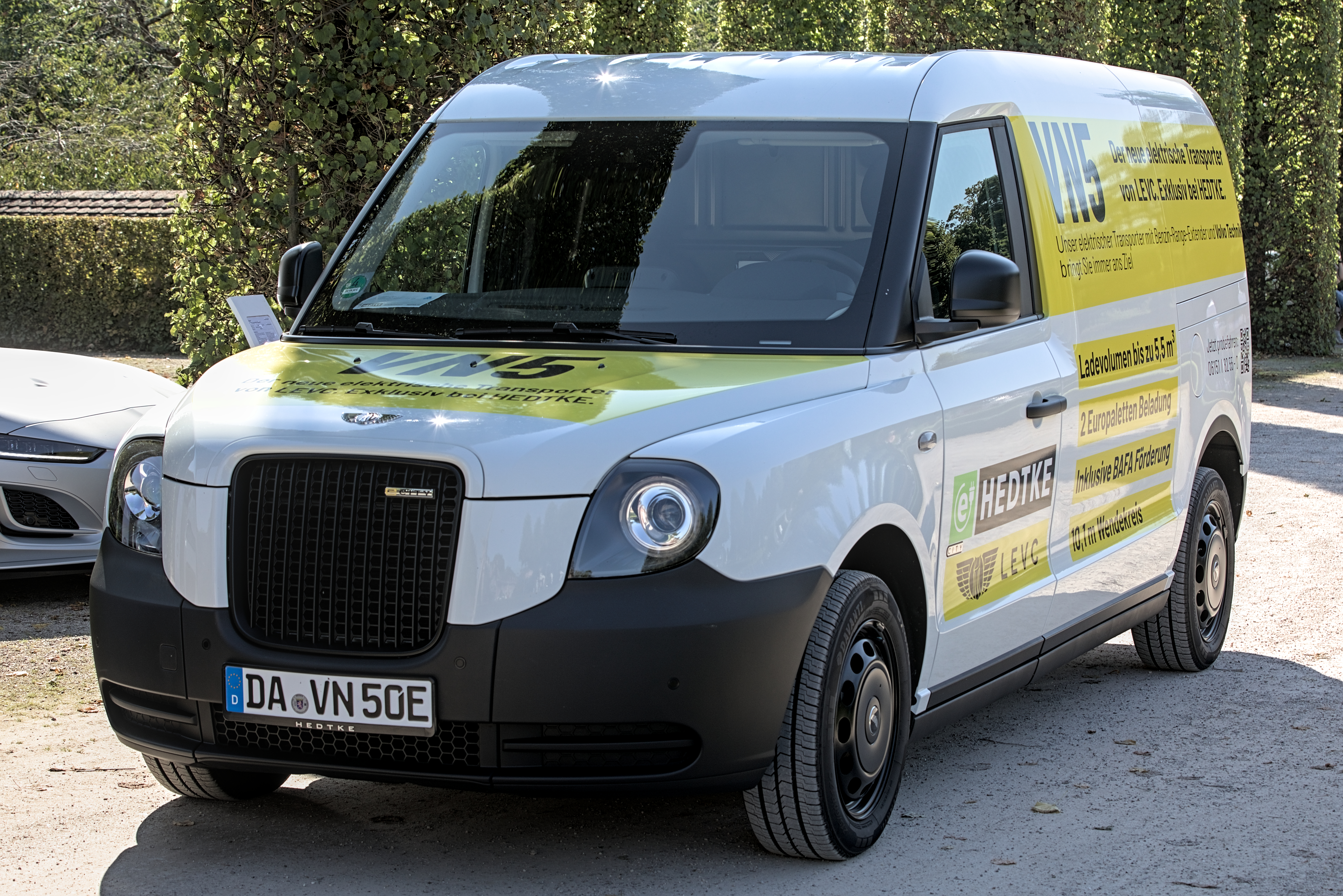
LEVC VN5

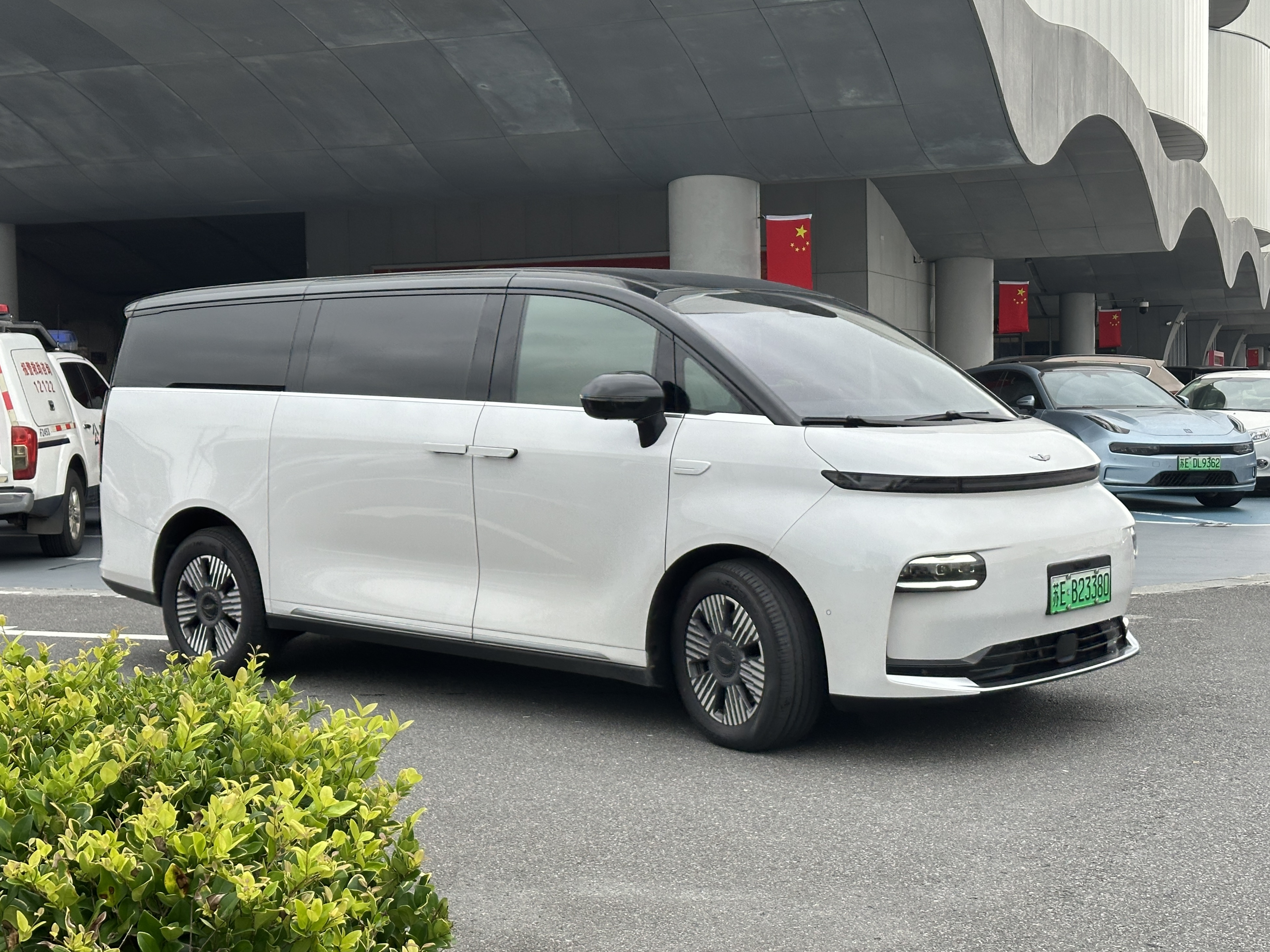
Geely Galaxy LEVC L380

==== Zeekr ====
Zeekr (Chinese: 极氪) is a premium battery electric vehicle brand of ZGH owned by Geely Automobile Holdings. The company is listed on the New York Stock Exchange since May 2024.

The brand was founded in 2021 as an offshoot of Lynk & Co, as its first vehicles were meant to be Lynk & Co models. However, after a major shareholding restructuring in 2024, it holds 51% of Lynk & Co currently.

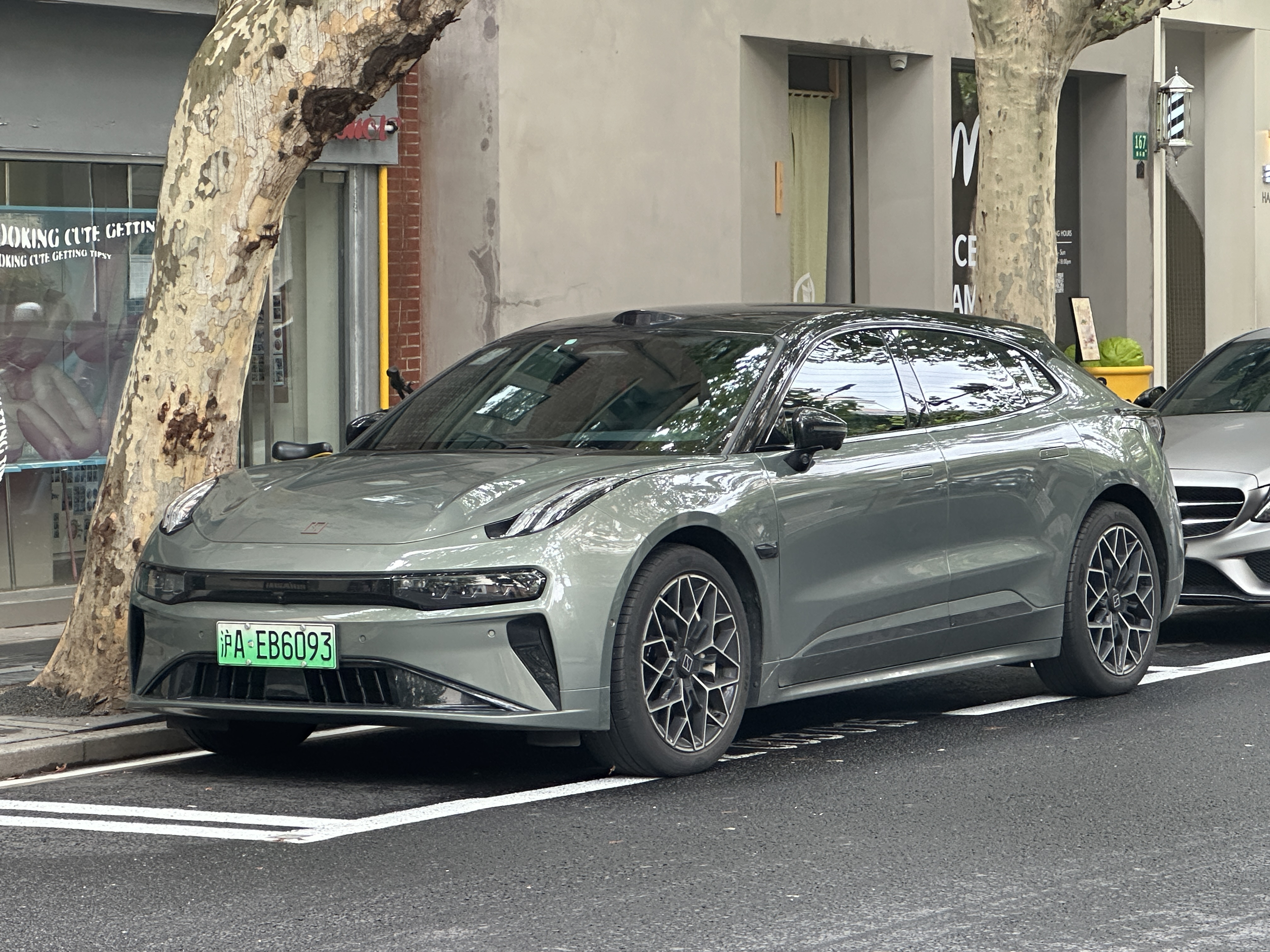
Zeekr 001

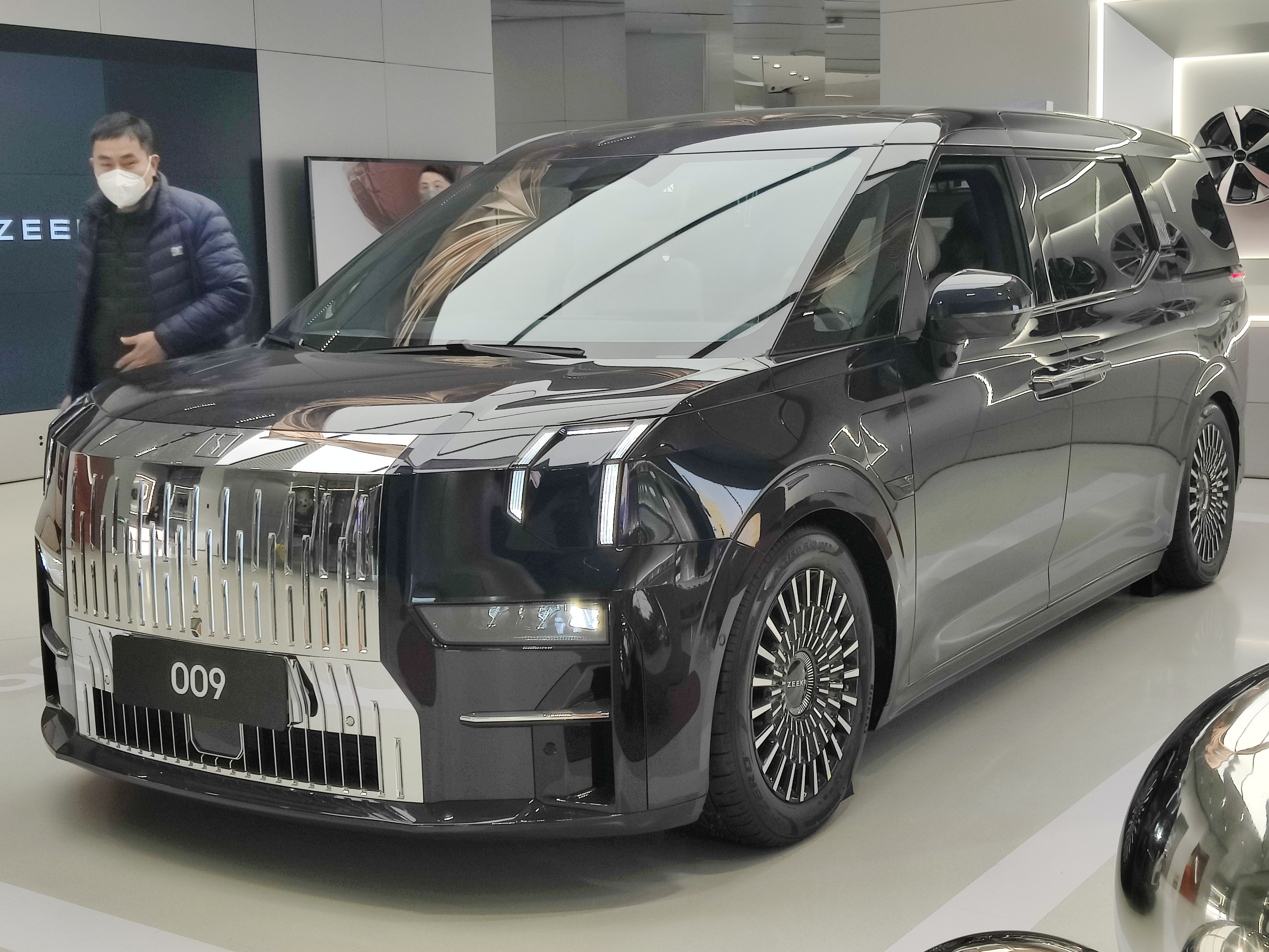
Zeekr 009

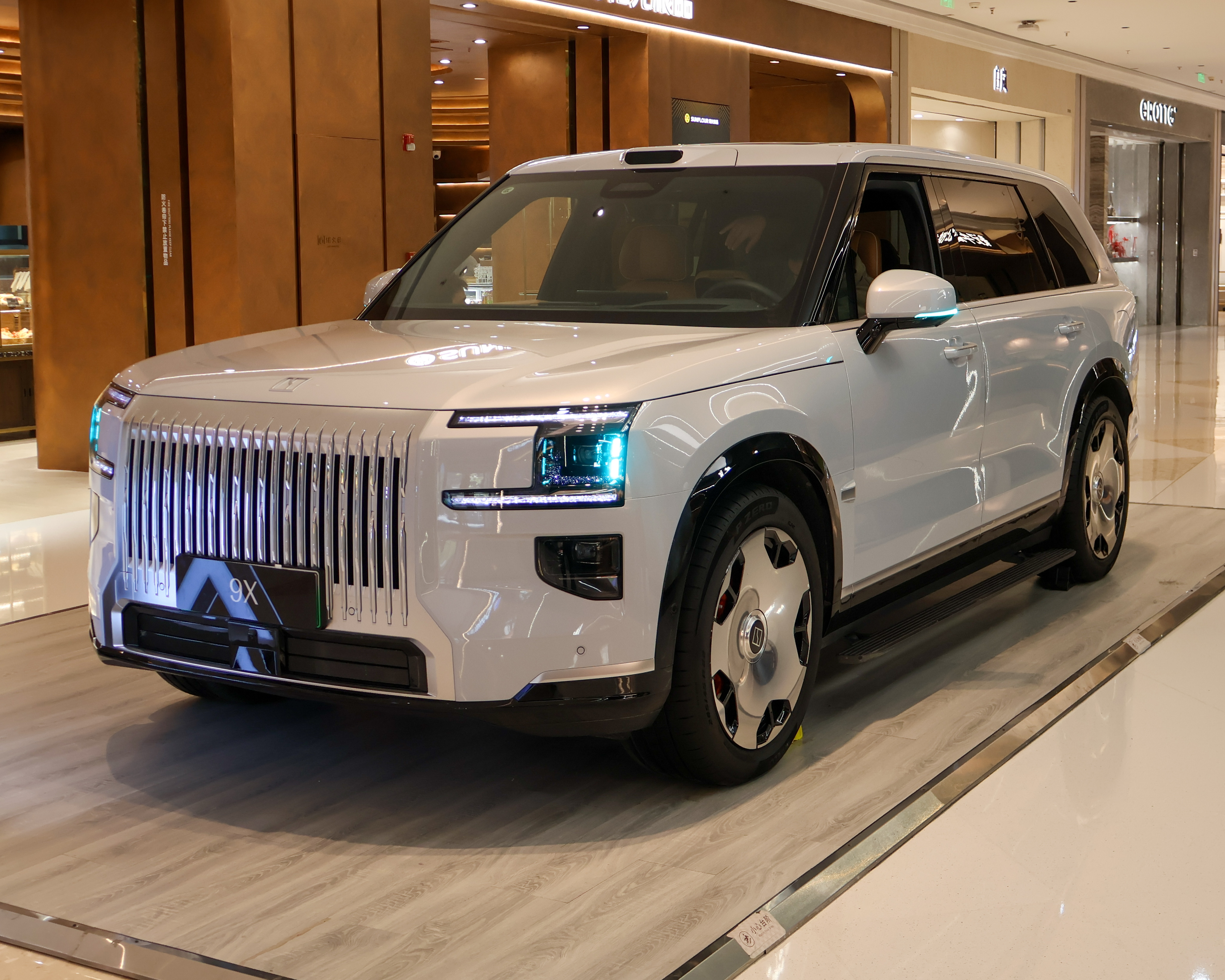
Zeekr 9X

===== Lynk & Co =====
Lynk & Co (Chinese: 领克) was established in 2017 that uses technology developed jointly by Volvo Cars and Geely Auto. Before 2024, It was owned 50% by Geely Auto, 30% by Volvo Cars, and 20% by ZGH. It currently 51% owned by Zeekr and 49% owned by Geely Auto after restructuring.

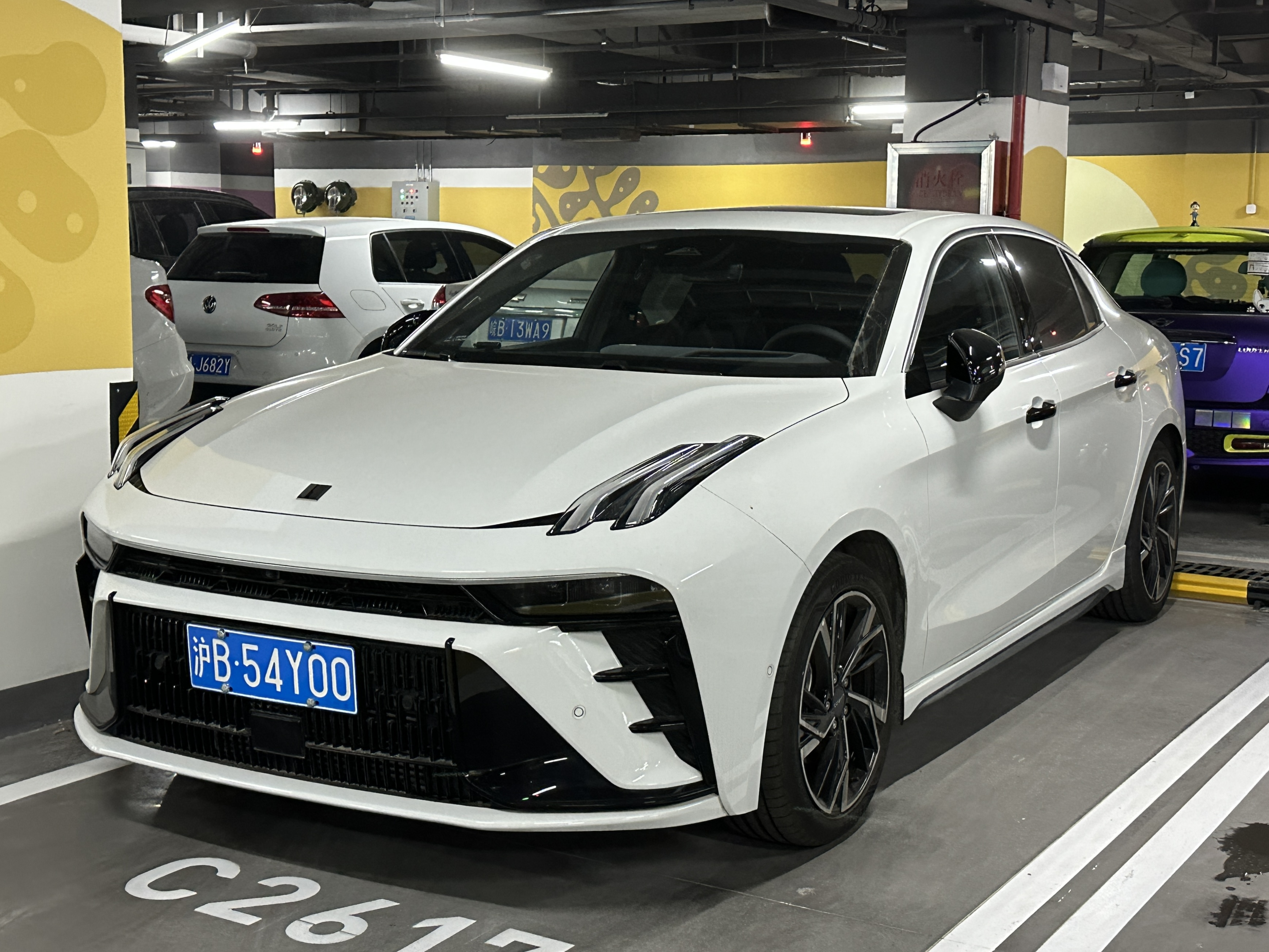
Lynk & Co 03

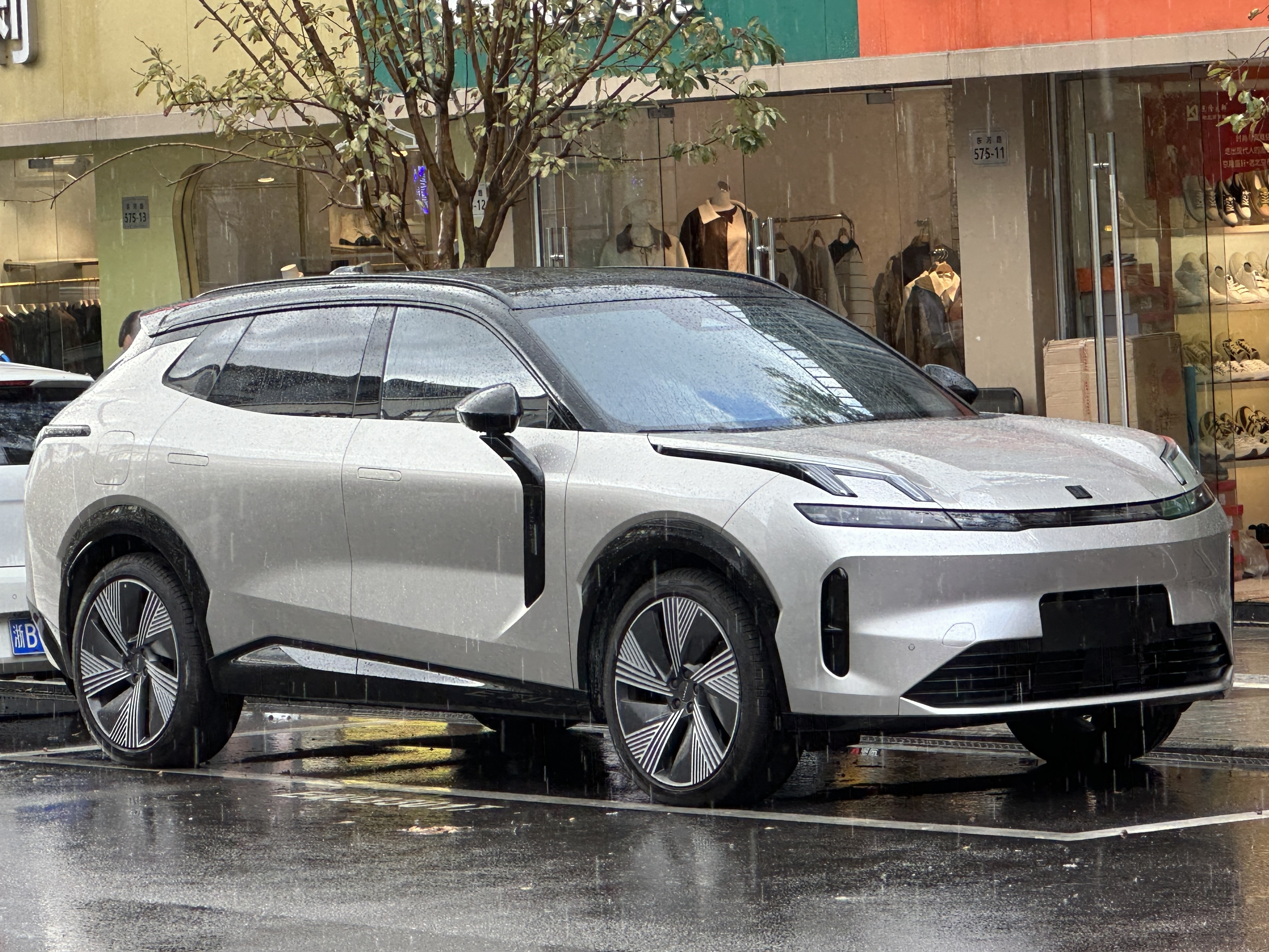
Lynk & Co 08

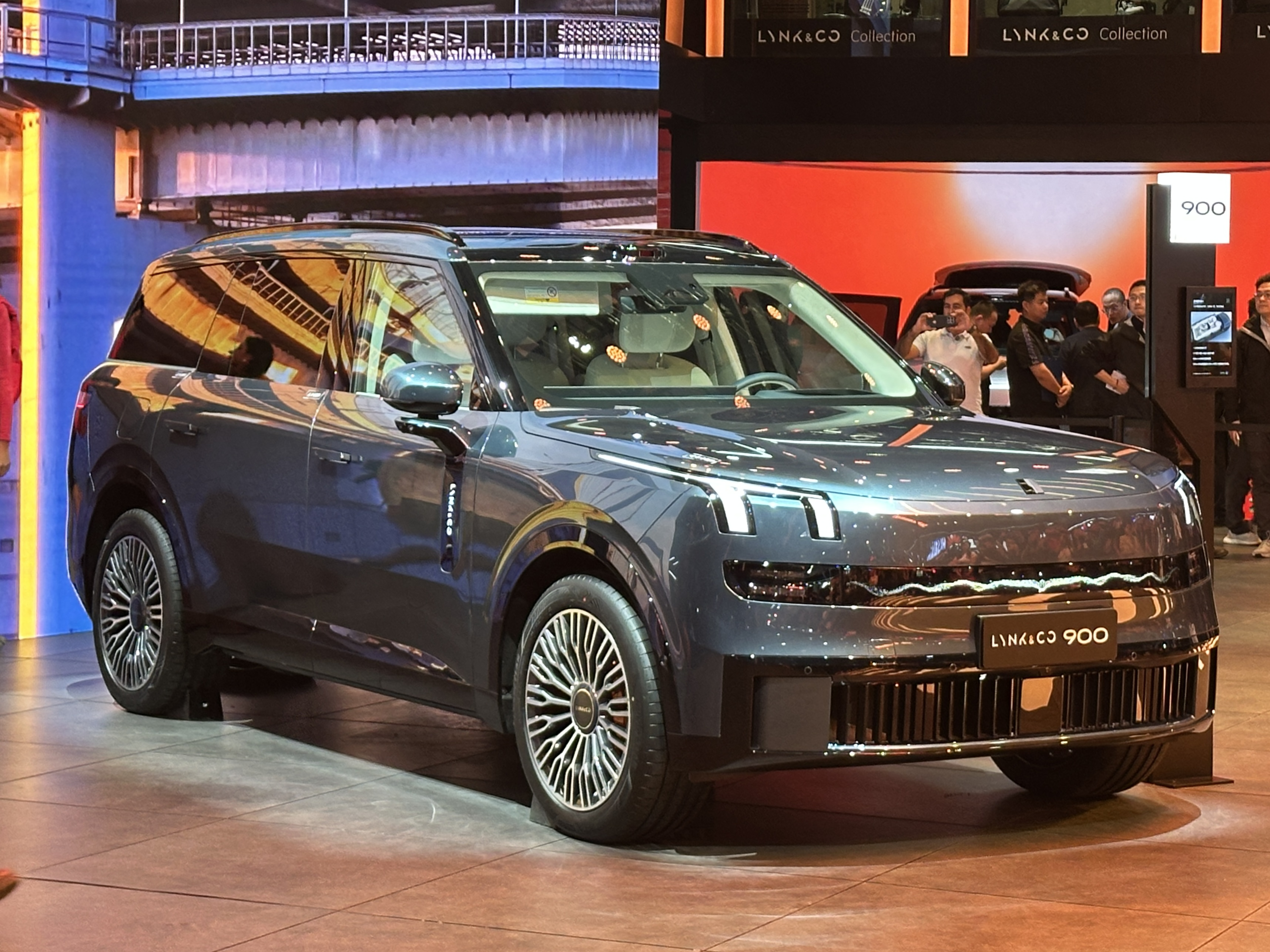
Lynk & Co 900

===== Proton =====
Proton is a national car brand of Malaysia, established in the 1980s at the behest of the government and later reverted to private ownership under DRB-HICOM. Since 2017, the brand is owned 49.9% by ZGH and 50.1% by DRB-HICOM. Its first Geely-based vehicle, also the carmaker's first-ever SUV, the Proton X70 was introduced in Malaysia in December 2018. It is based on first-generation Geely Boyue.

In July 2023, after the internal restructuring in Geely Group, the Proton brand was consolidated into the balance sheets of Geely Auto.

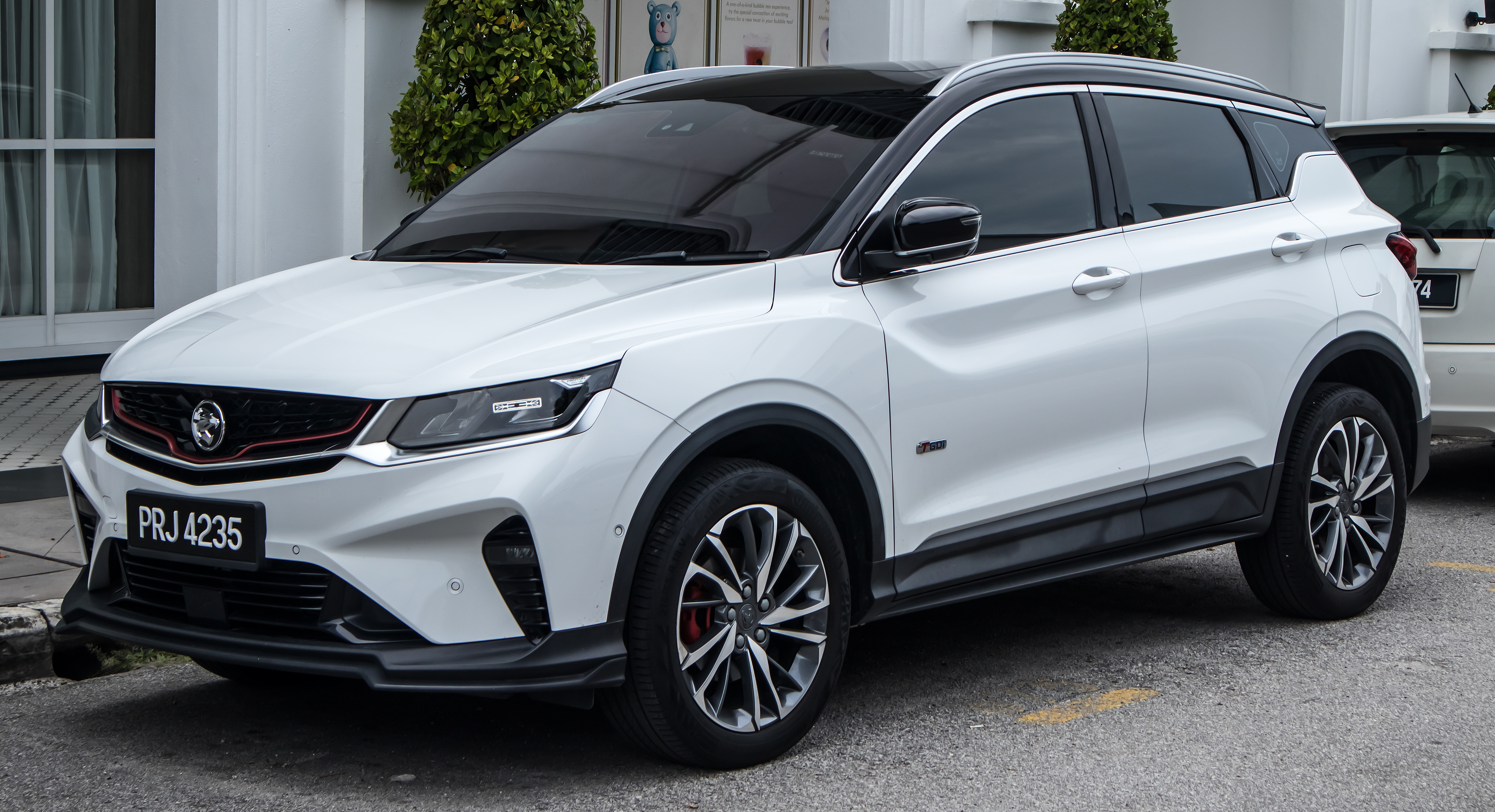
Proton X50

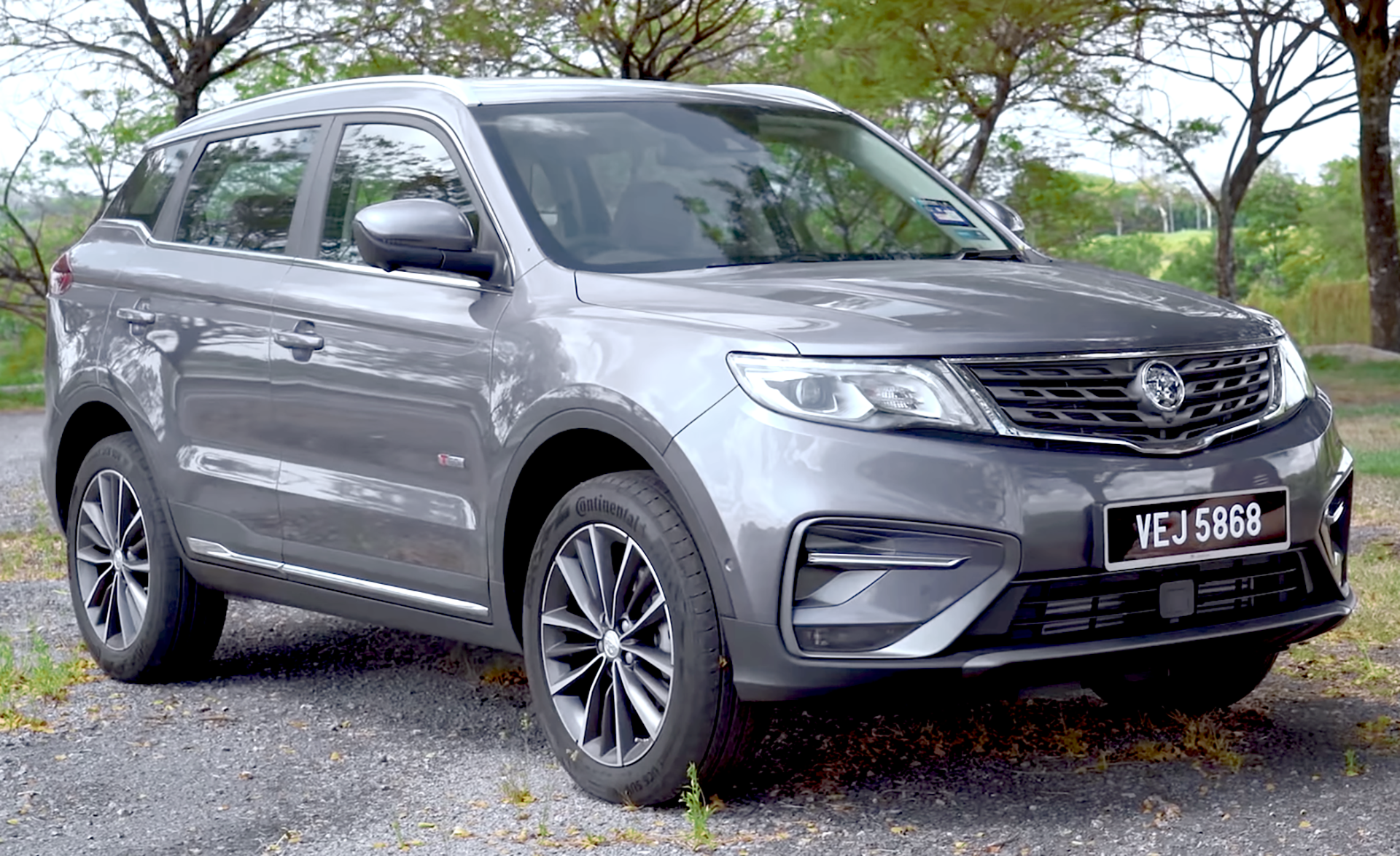
Proton X70

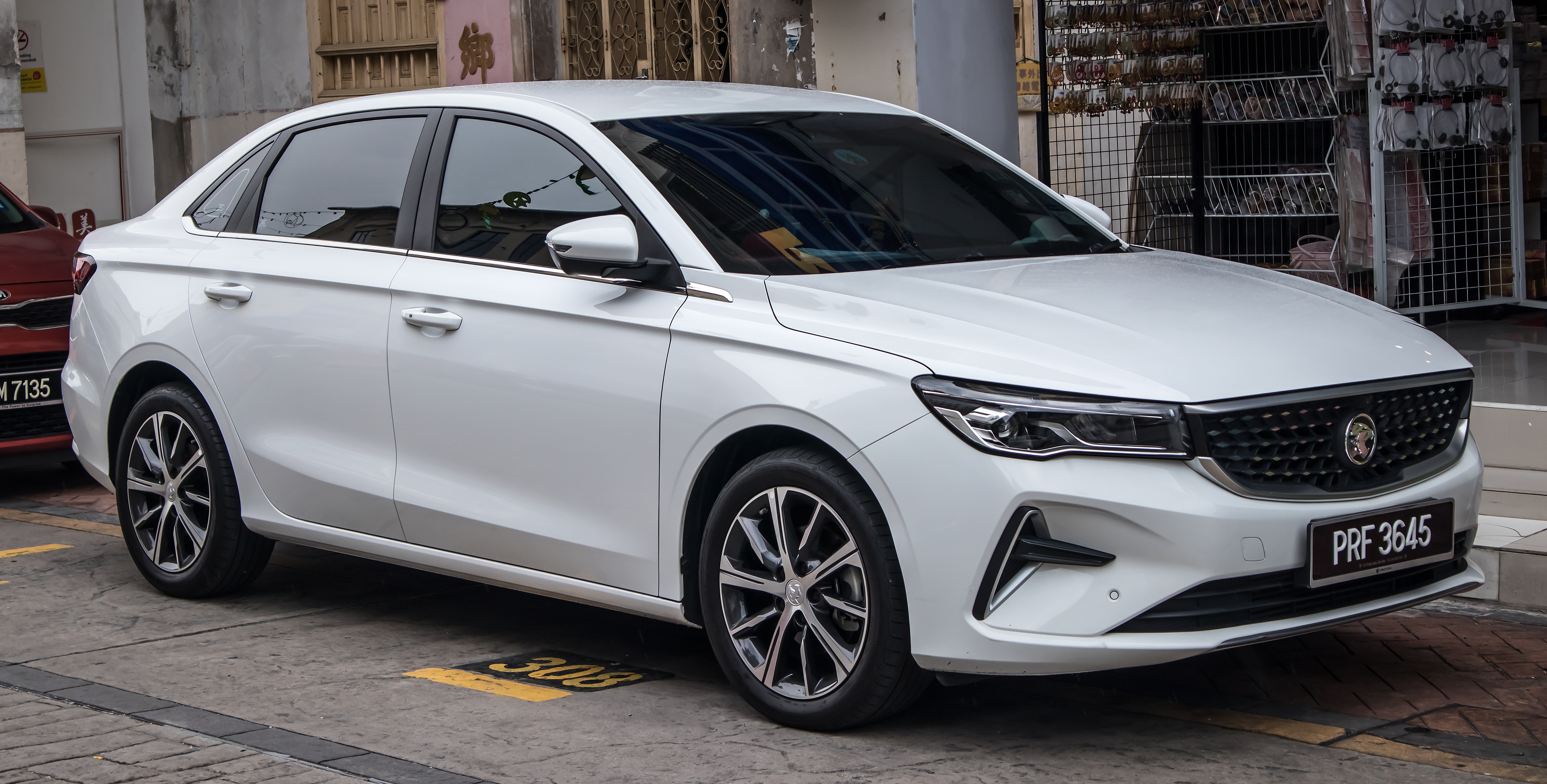
Proton S70

==== Volvo Cars ====
Volvo Cars is owned 78.7% by ZGH (post Volvo Cars IPO). ZGH acquired Volvo Cars from Ford Motor Company in 2010.

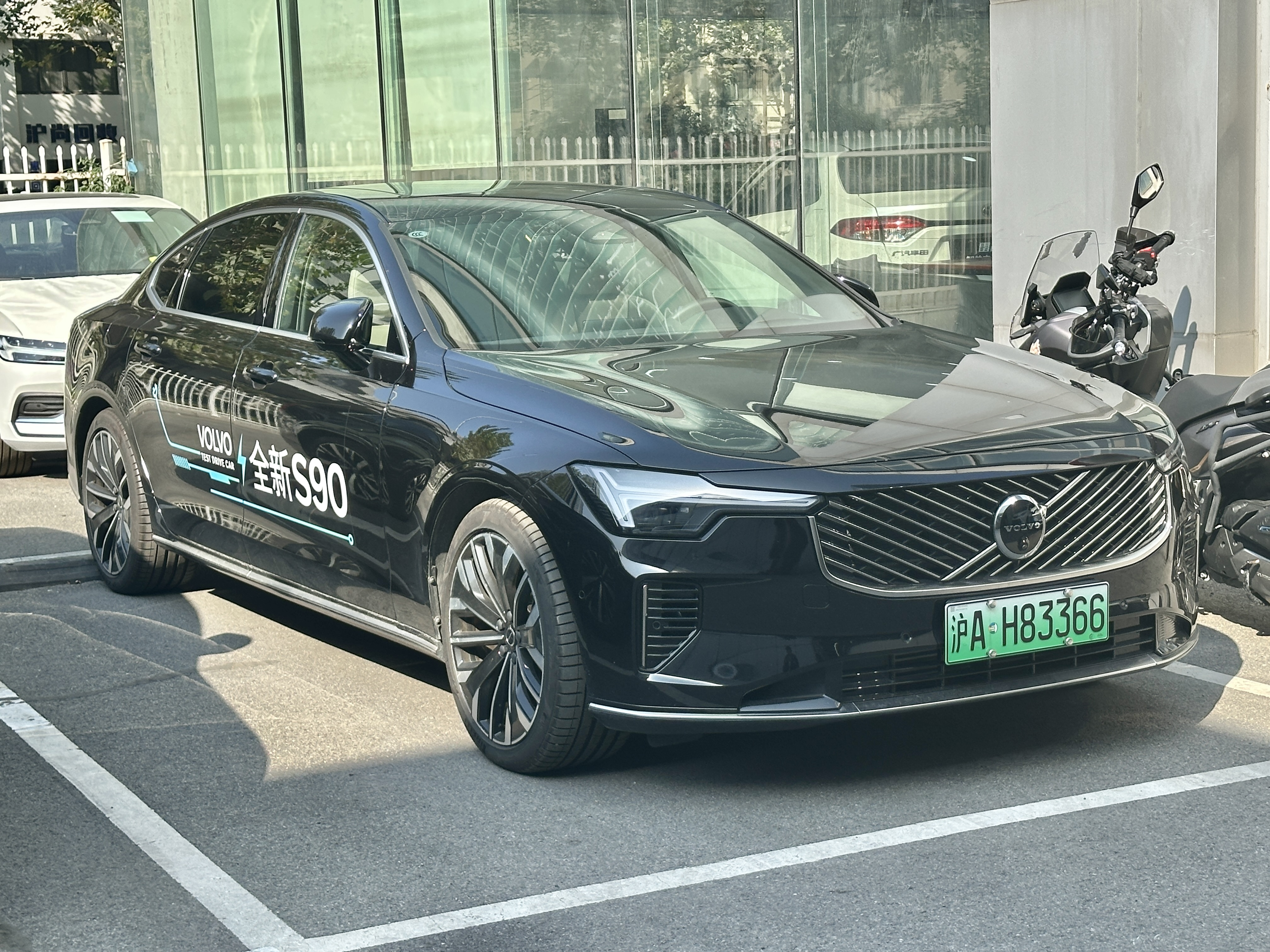
Volvo S90

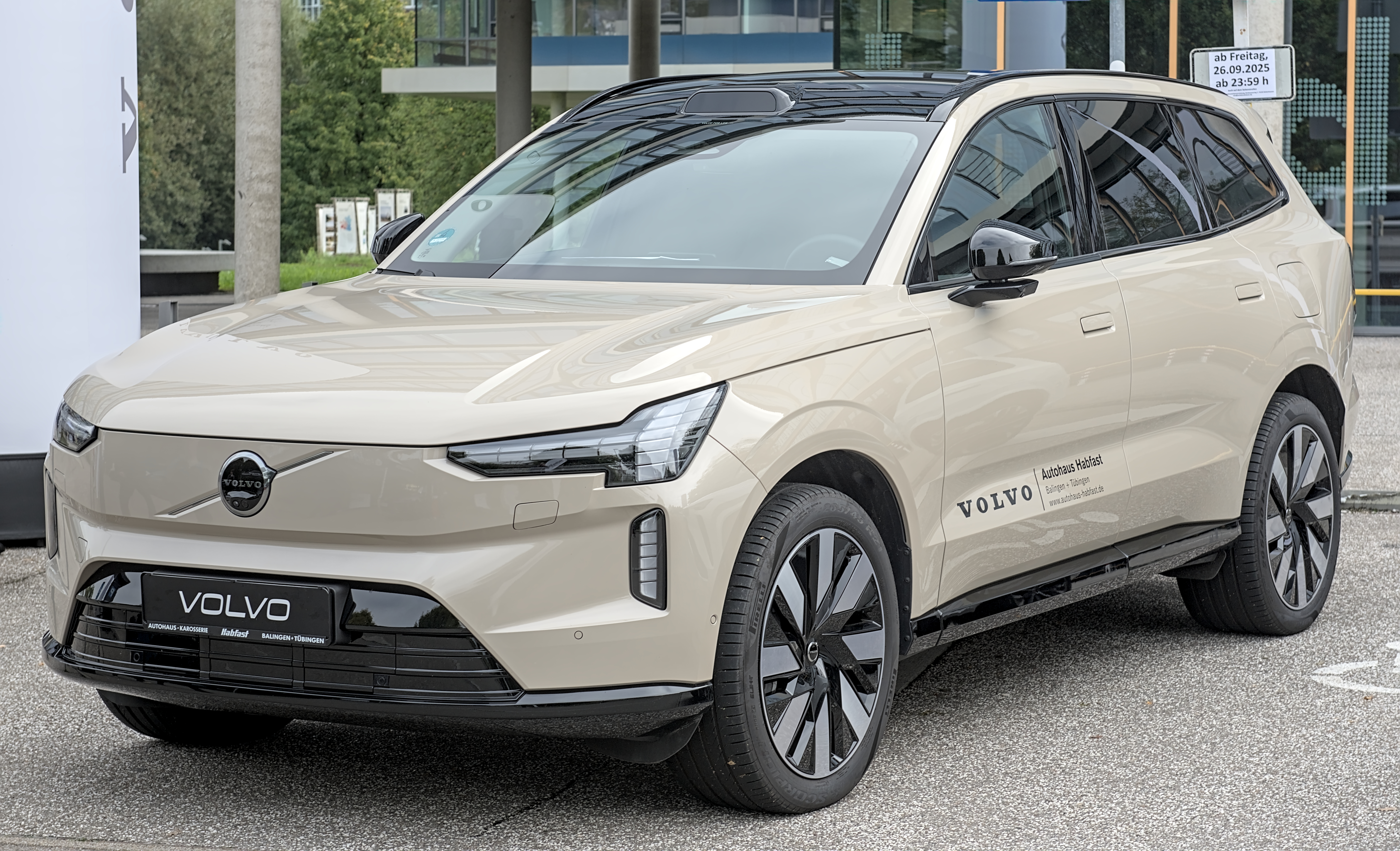
Volvo EX90

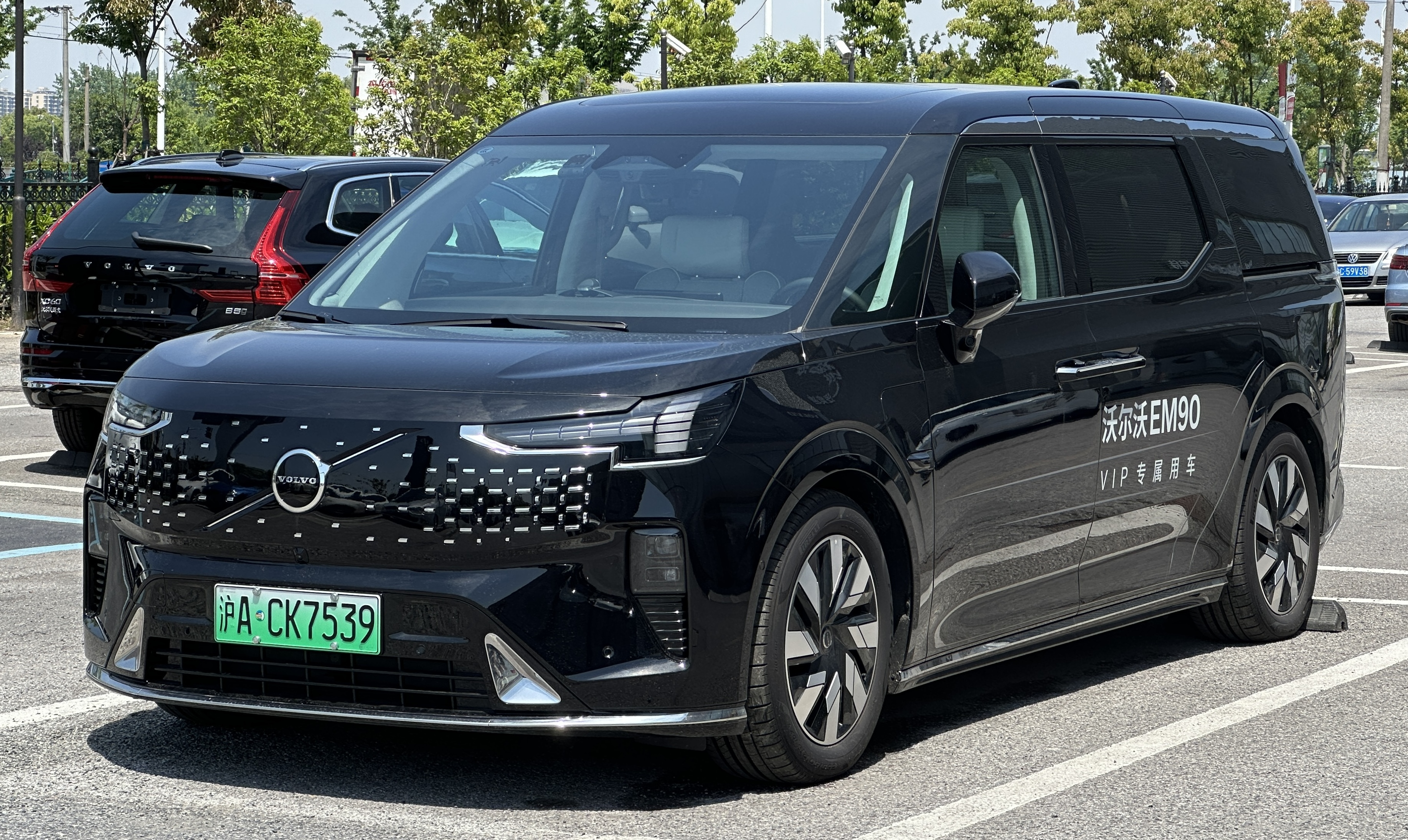
Volvo EM90

==== Polestar ====
Polestar is a publicly traded electric car brand established in Sweden. It is 16% owned by Volvo Cars, 66% owned by Geely and Li Shufu combined.

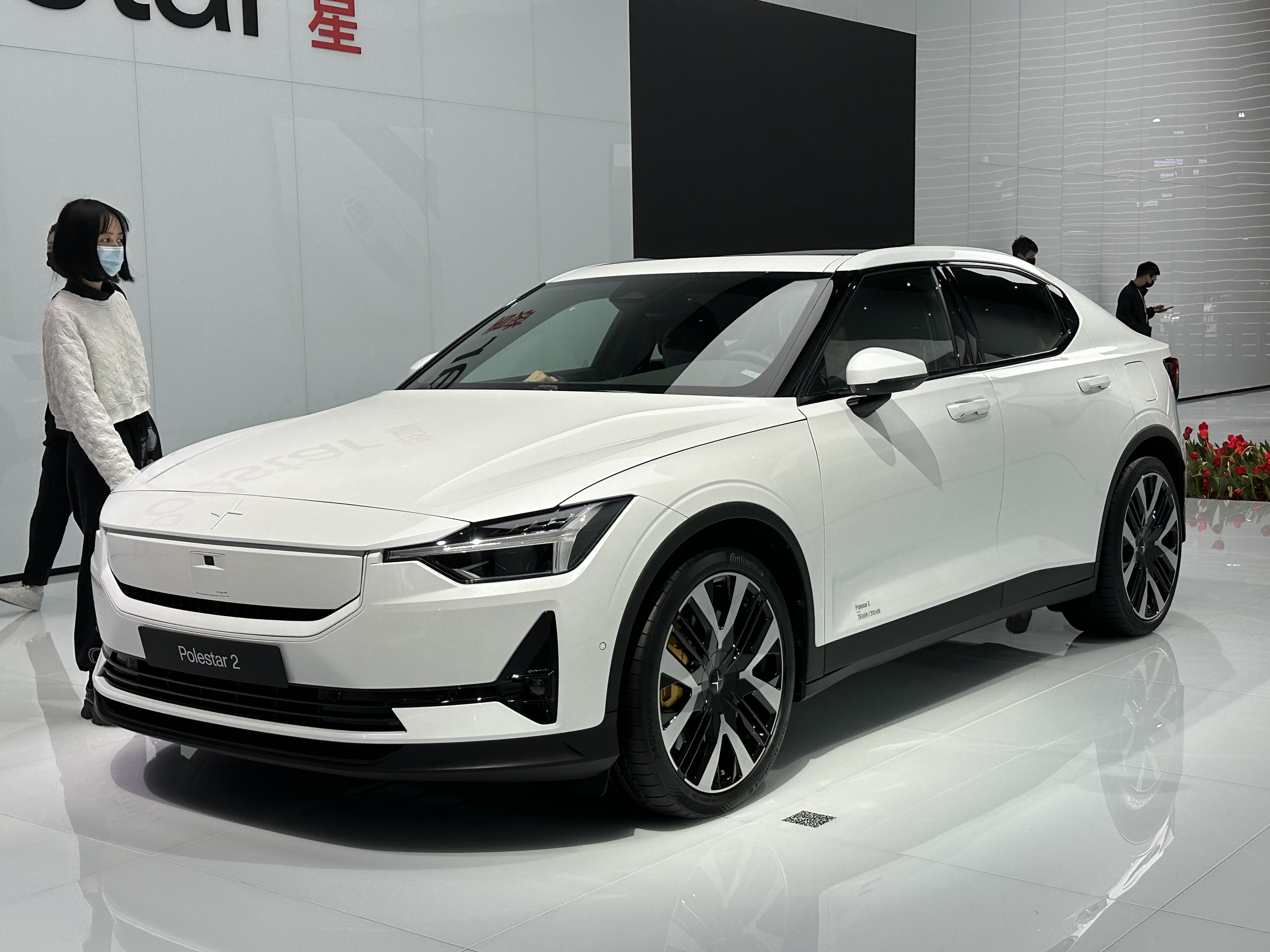
Polestar 2

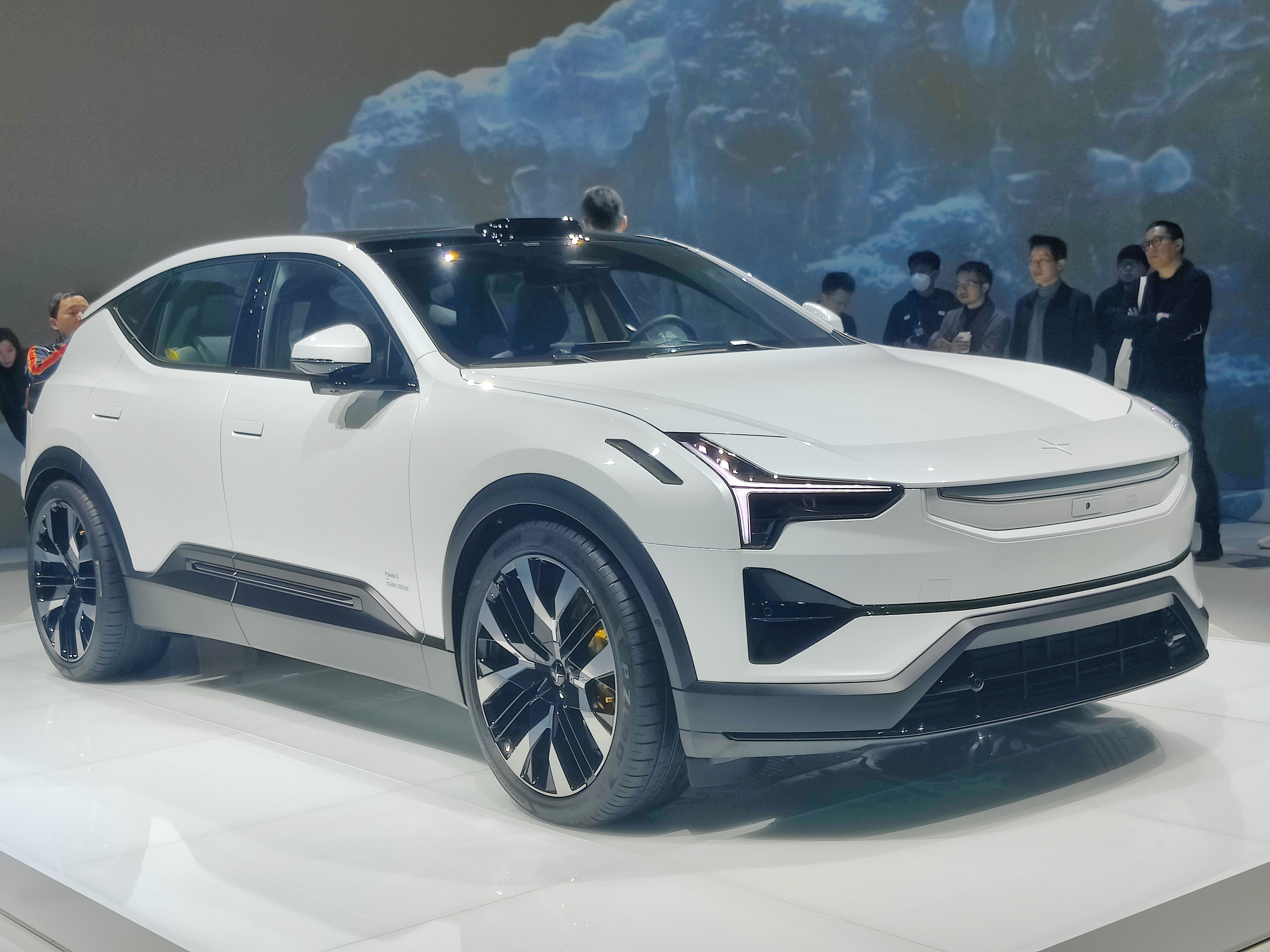
Polestar 3

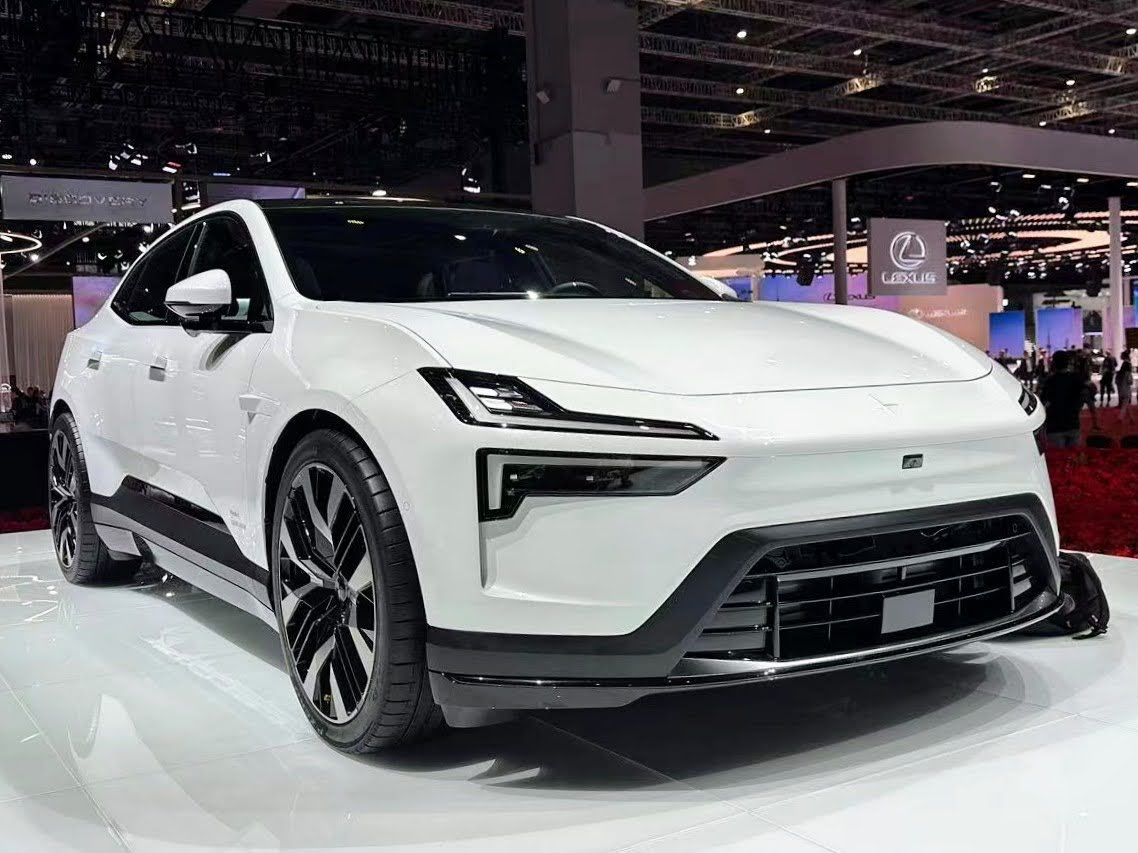
Polestar 4

==== Livan/Maple ====
The Maple brand name originated with Shanghai Maple Automobile, a Geely subsidiary established in 1999 and phased out in 2010. The brand was temporarily revived in 2020 by launching its first EV, the Maple 30X. In 2022, Geely launched the joint venture between Lifan (current Qianli Technology) and Maple called Livan (Chinese: 睿蓝), and the previous Maple products were reconsolidated into Livan.

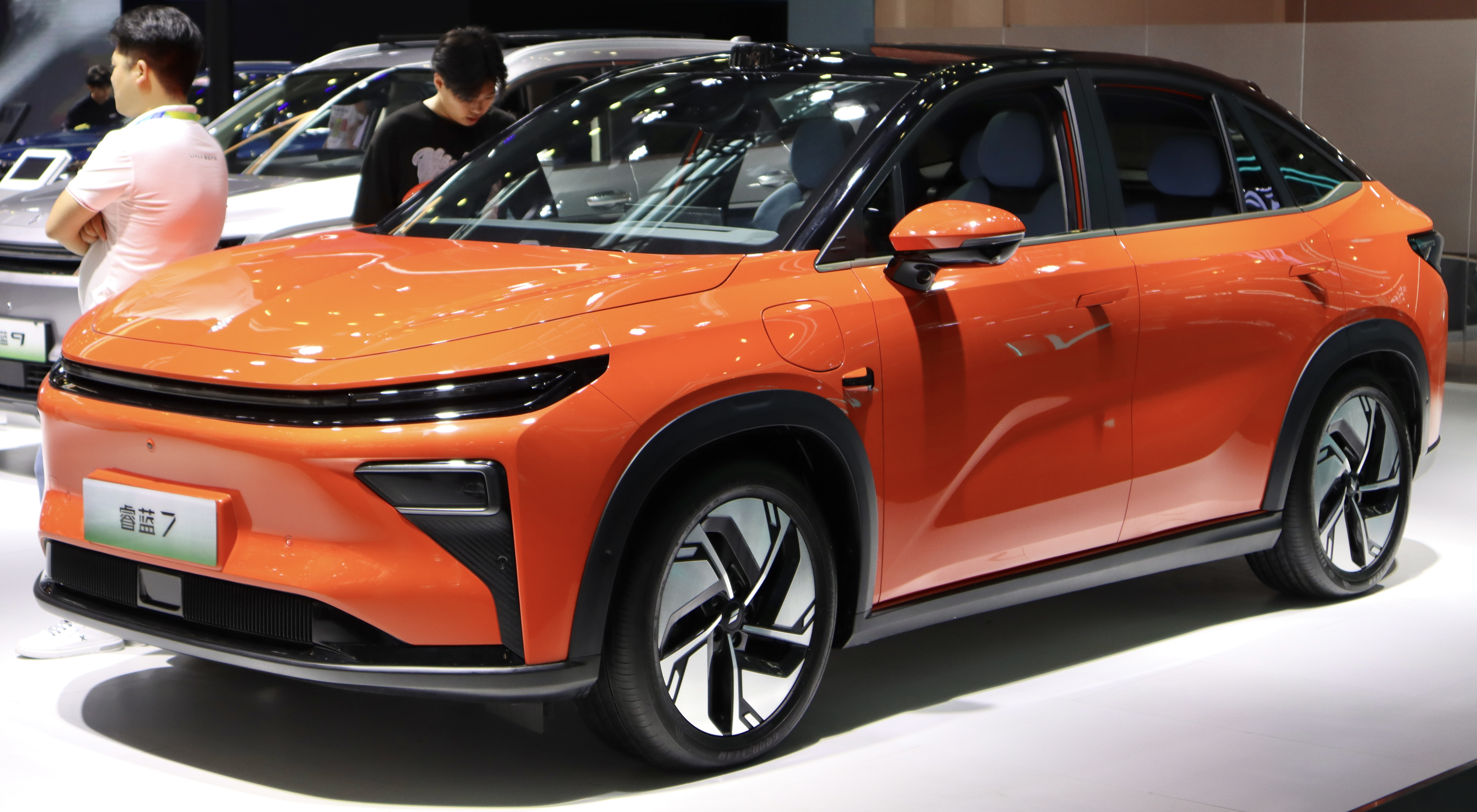
Livan 7

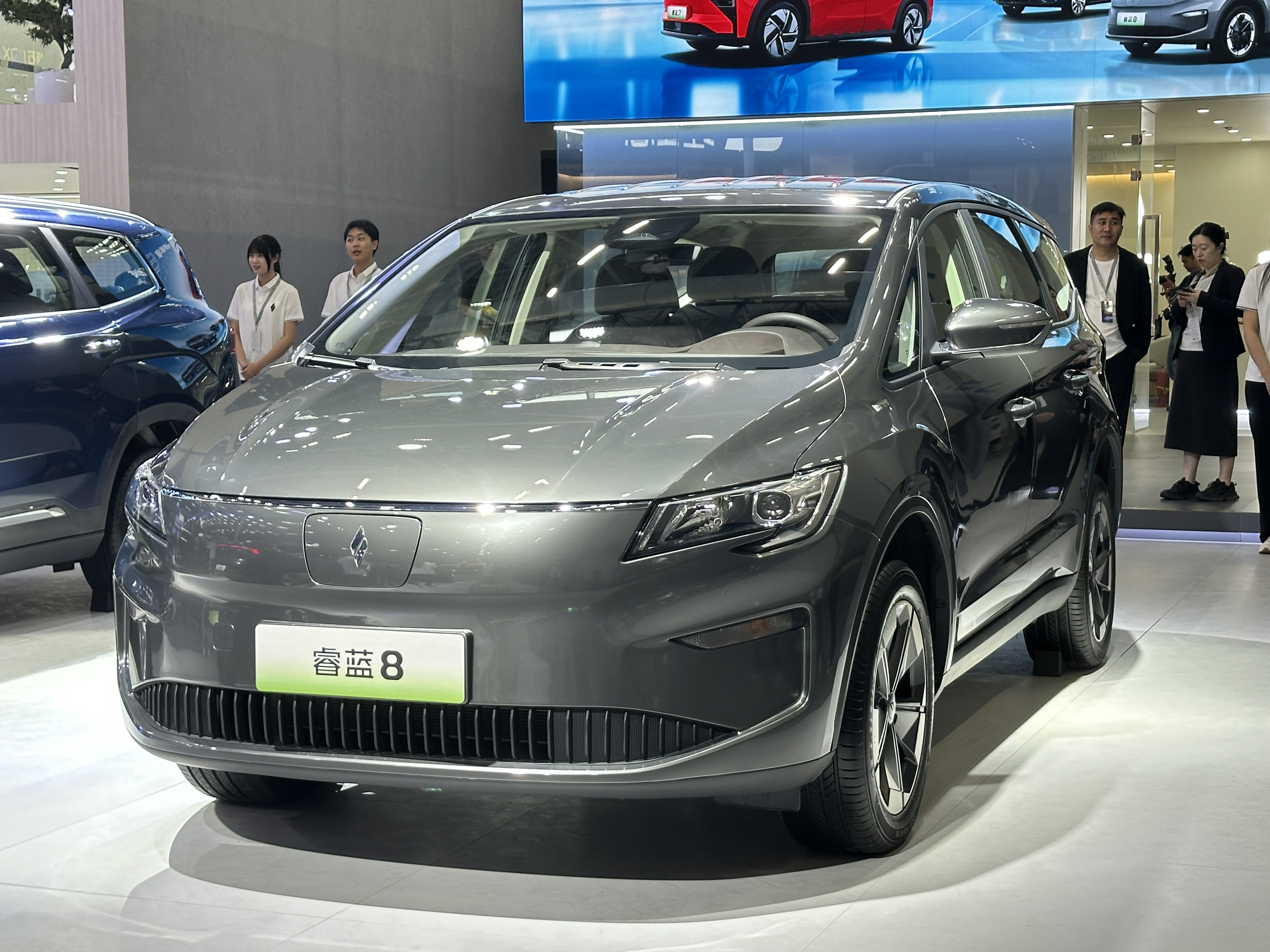
Livan 8

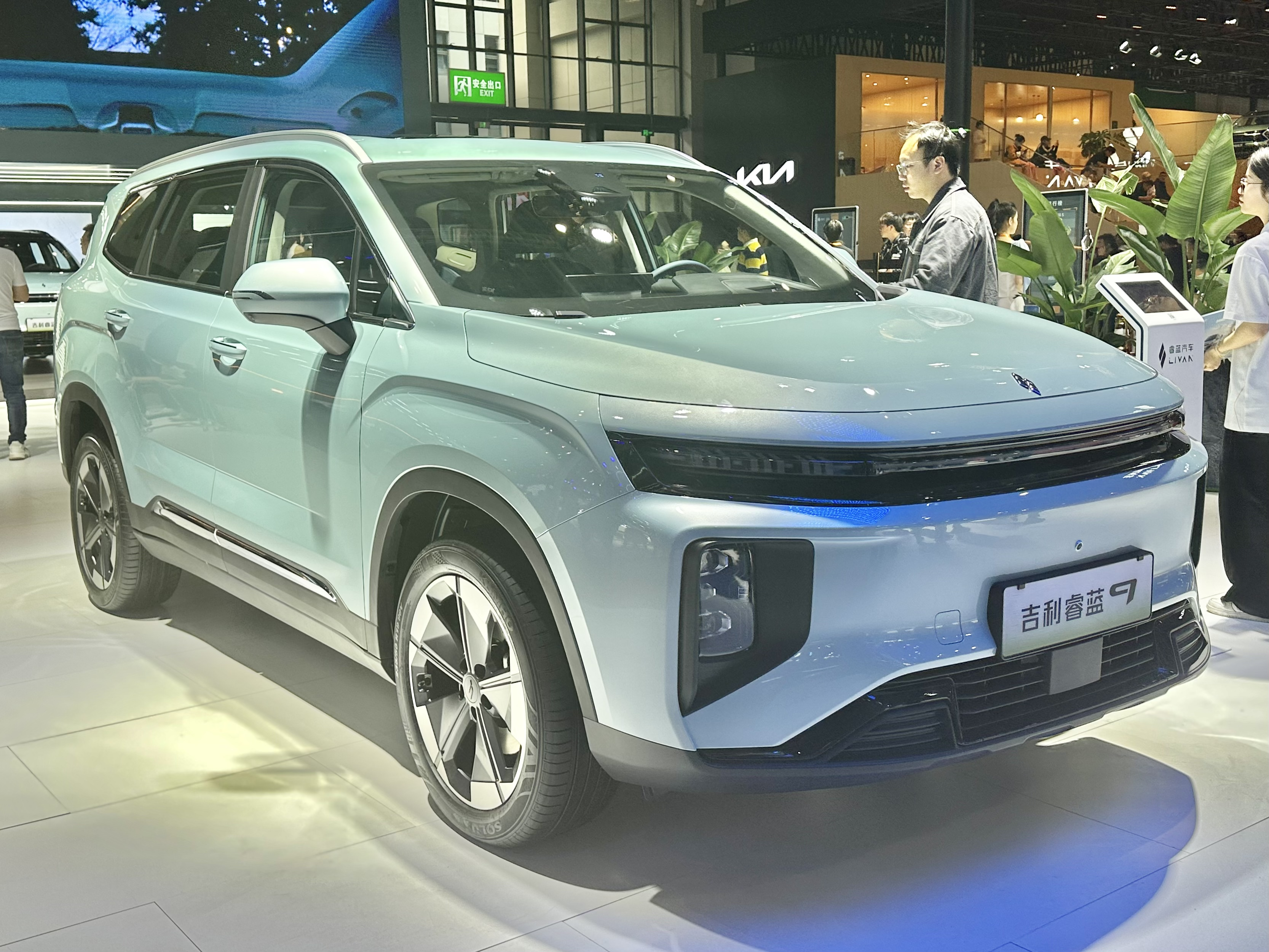
Livan 9

==== Lotus ====
Lotus Cars is a British carmaker established in 1948 that produces sports and racing cars. It is fully owned by ZGH since 2026.

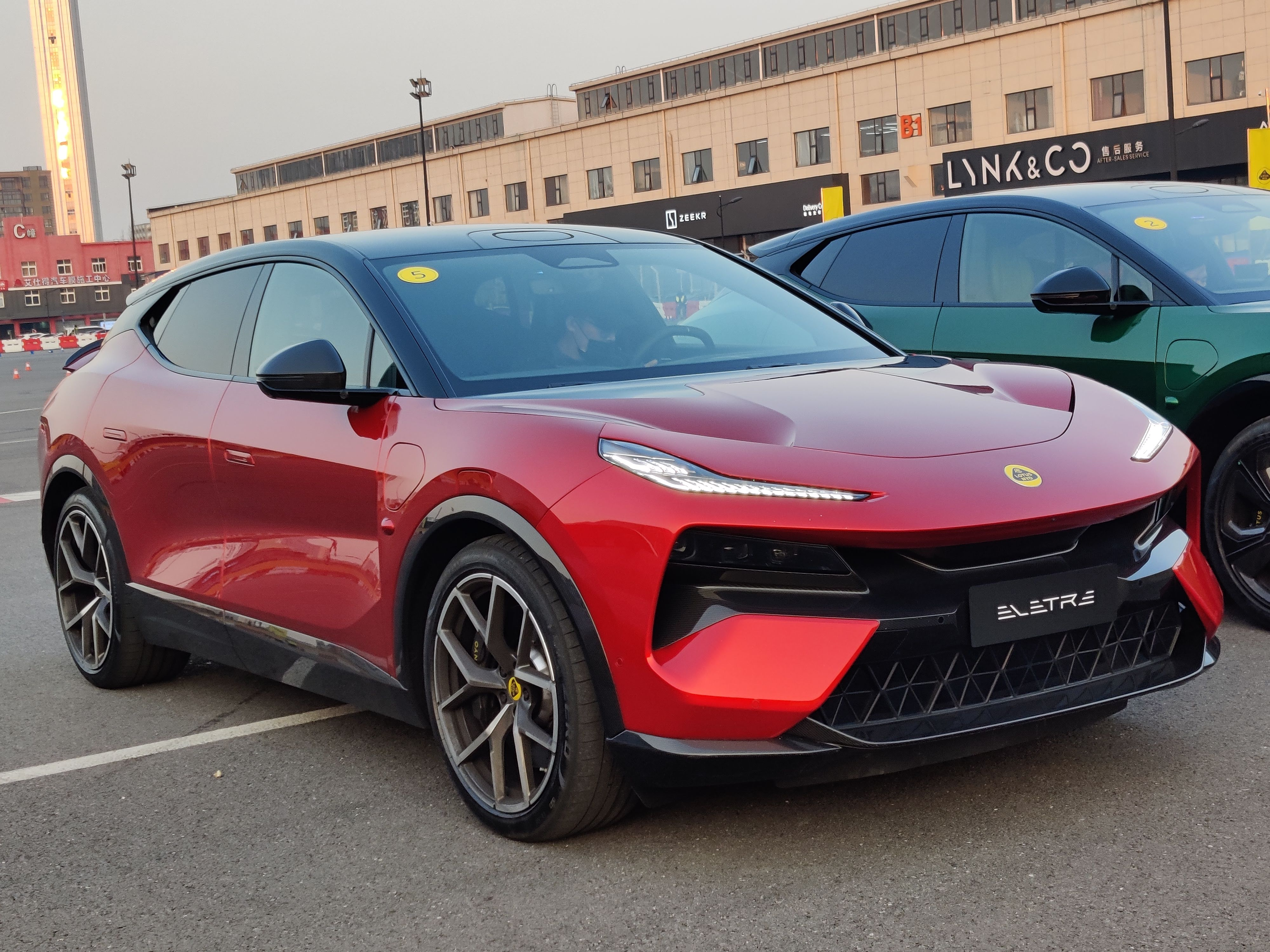
Lotus Eletre

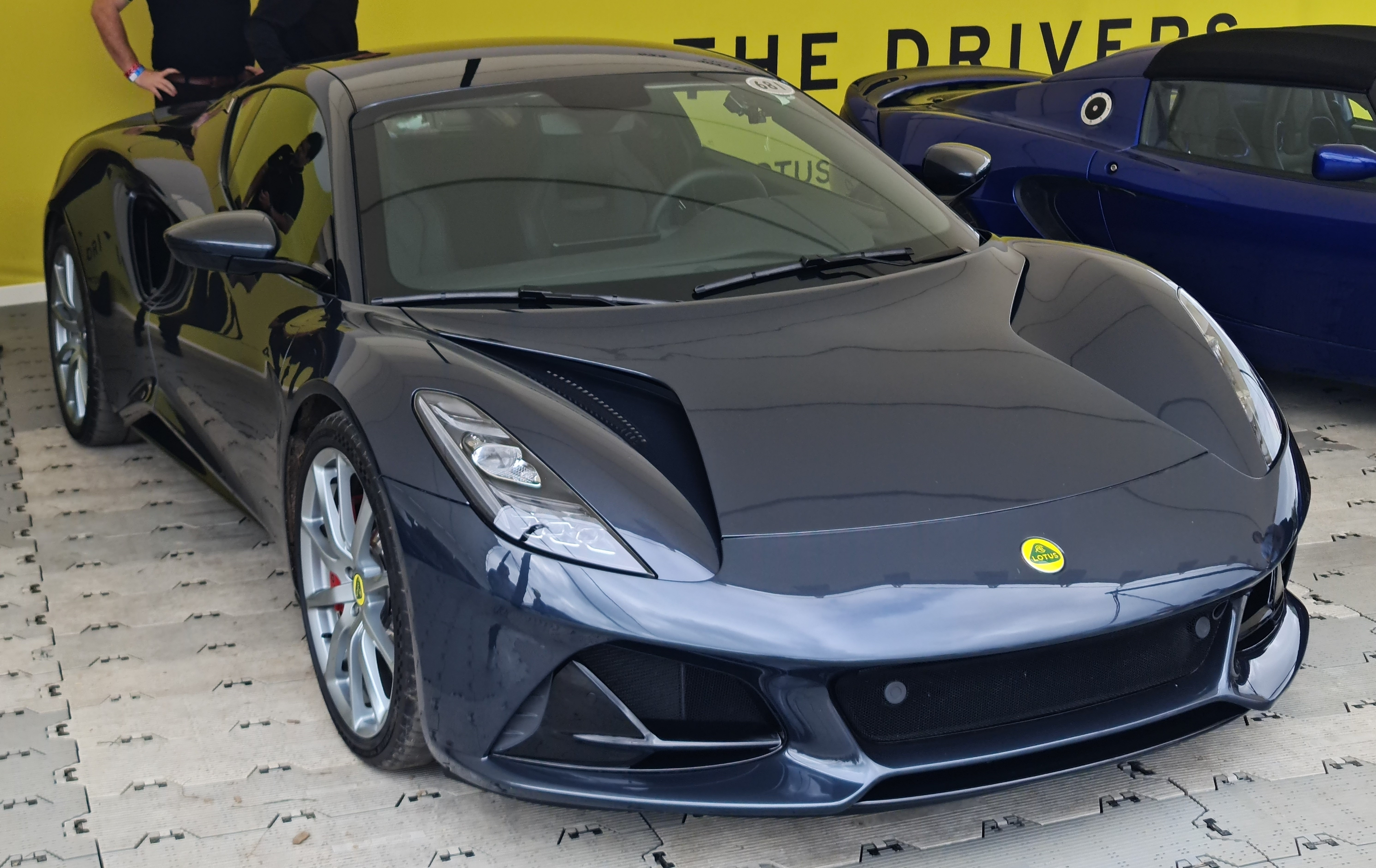
Lotus Emira

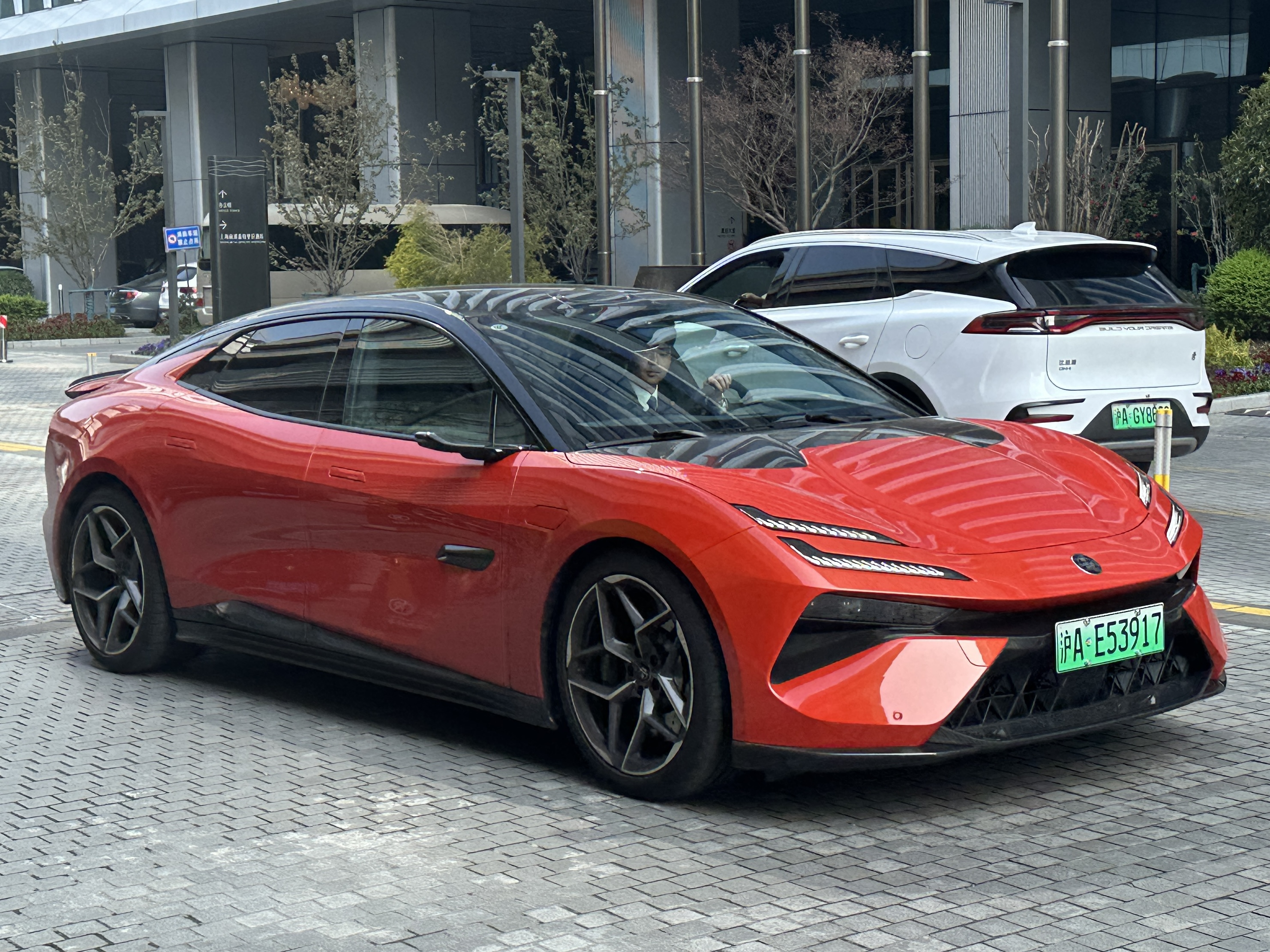
Lotus Emeya

==== Farizon ====
Farizon Auto (Chinese: 远程汽车) was established in 2016 to focus on the development and sales of electric commercial vehicles.

Farizon also has a sub-brand called Ouling (Chinese: 欧铃) and Hanma (Chinese: 汉马科技) selling gasoline-powered light and heavy trucks.

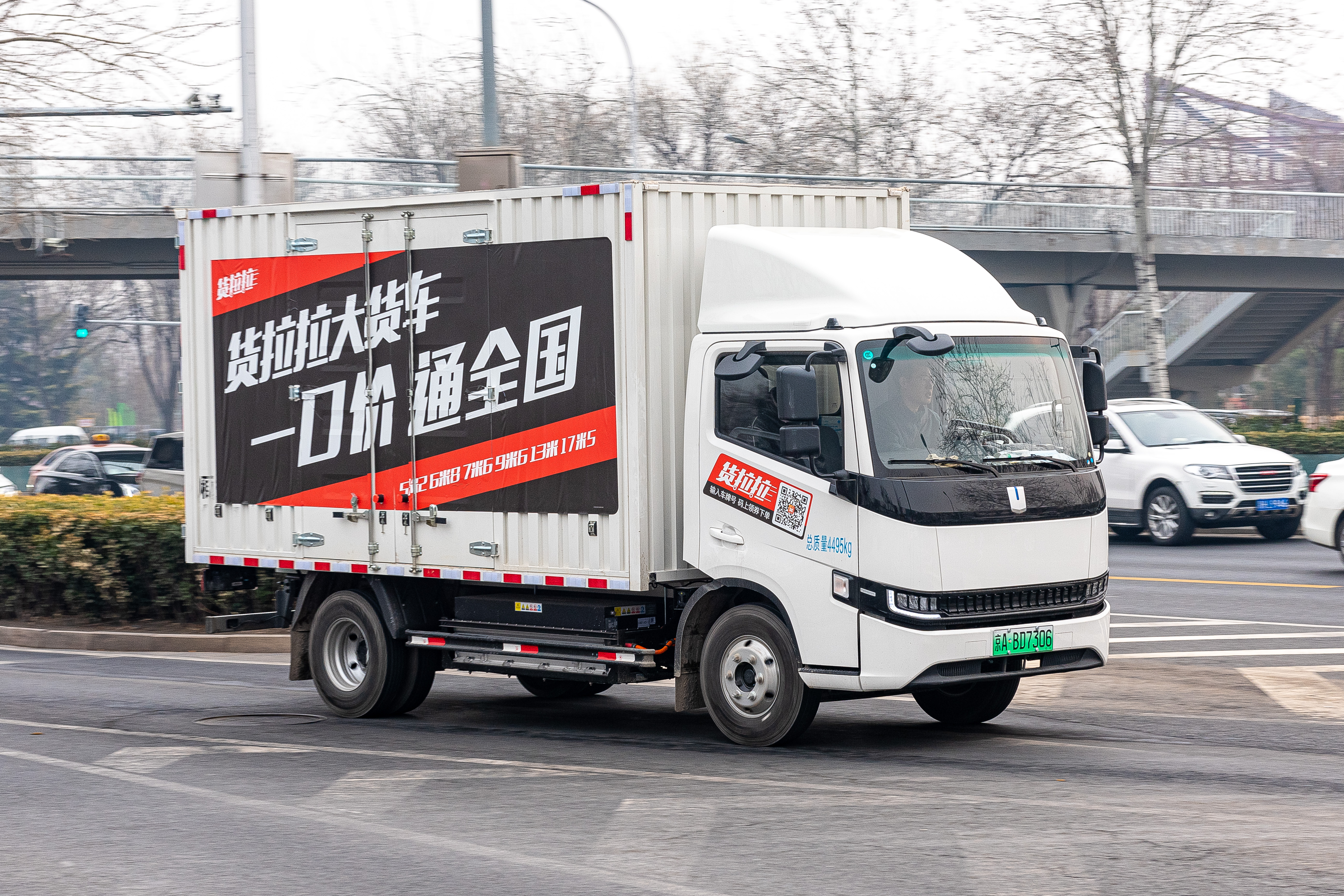
Farizon Xingzhi H8E

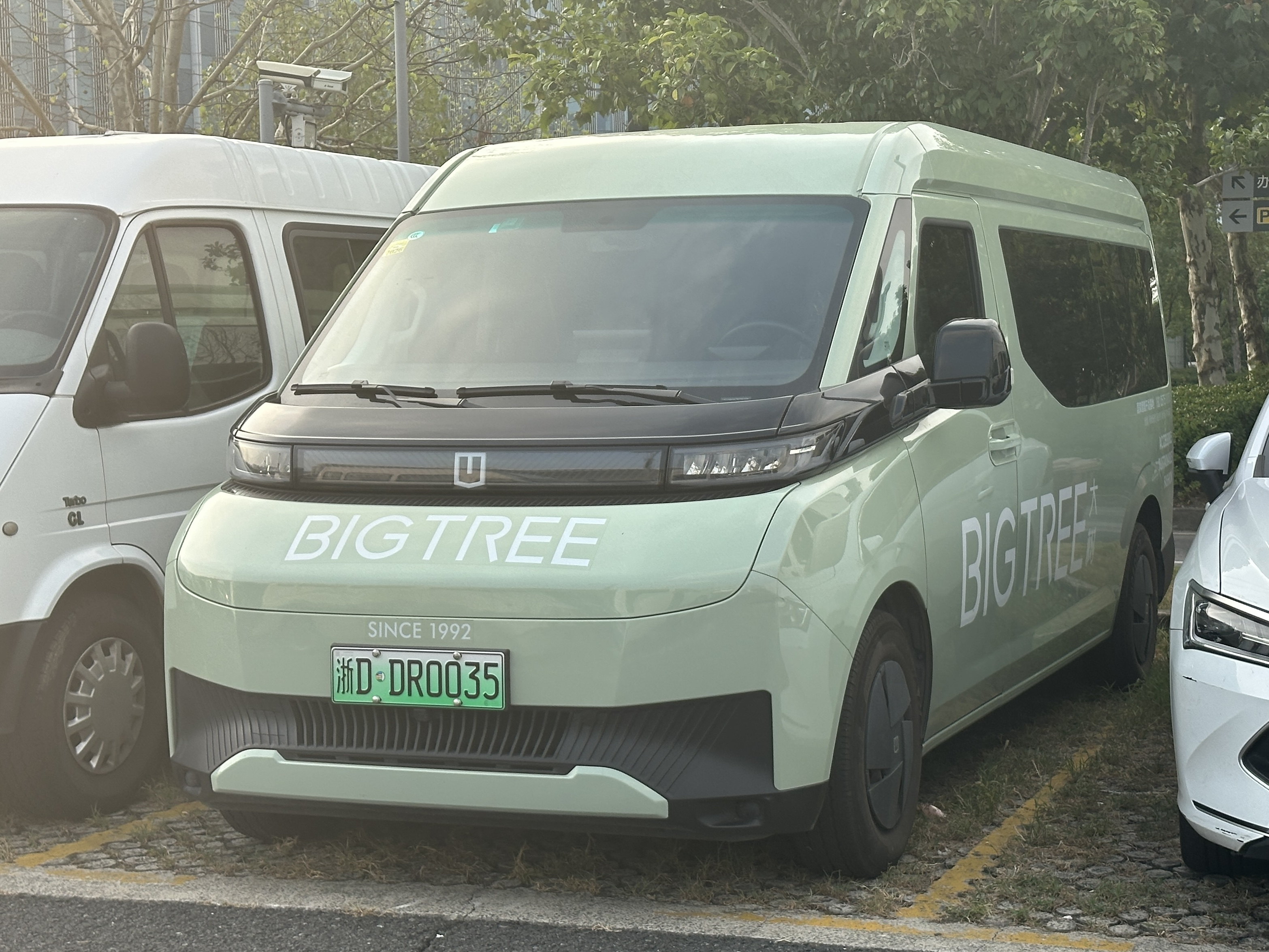
Farizon SV

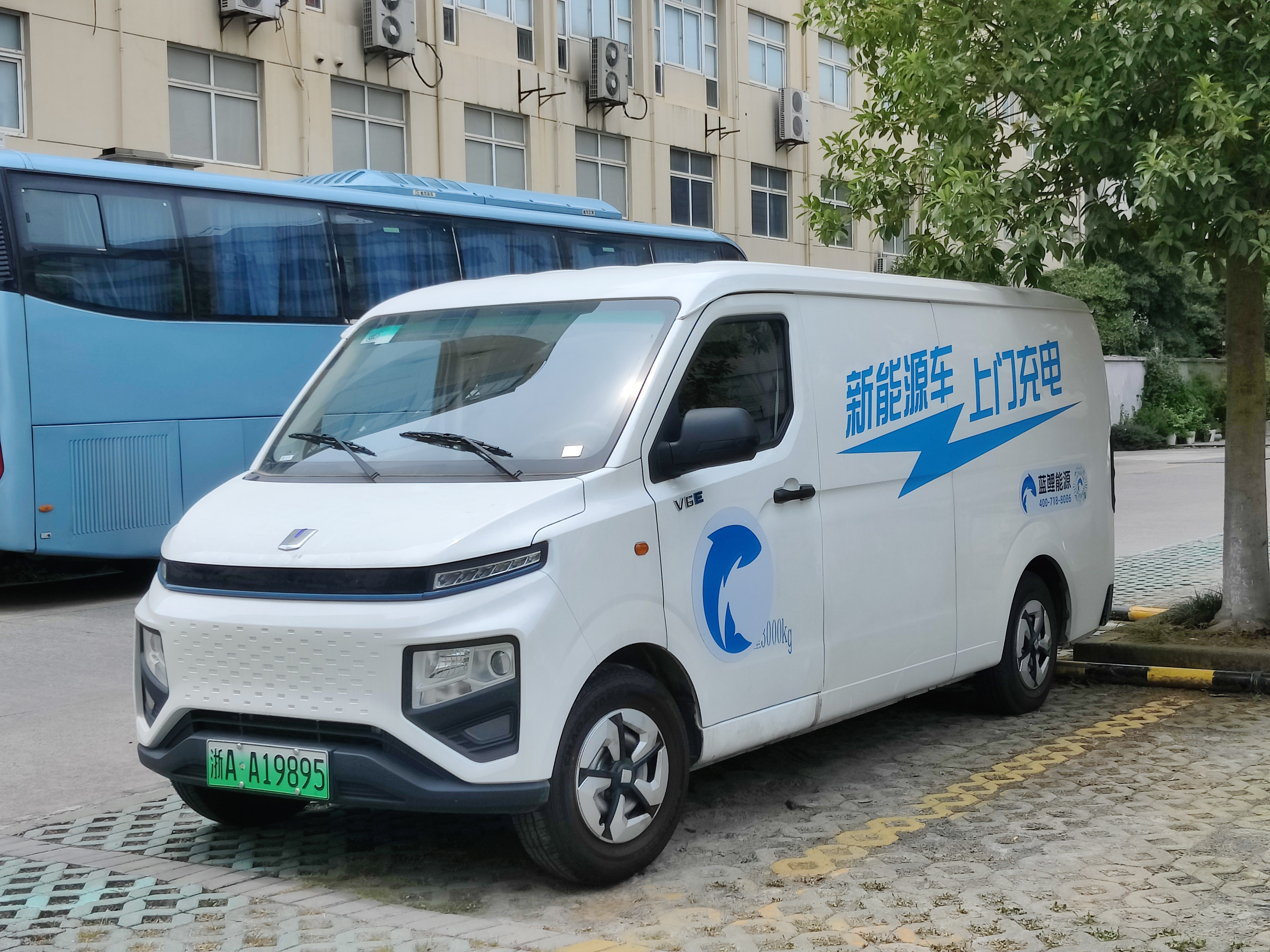
Farizon Xingxiang V
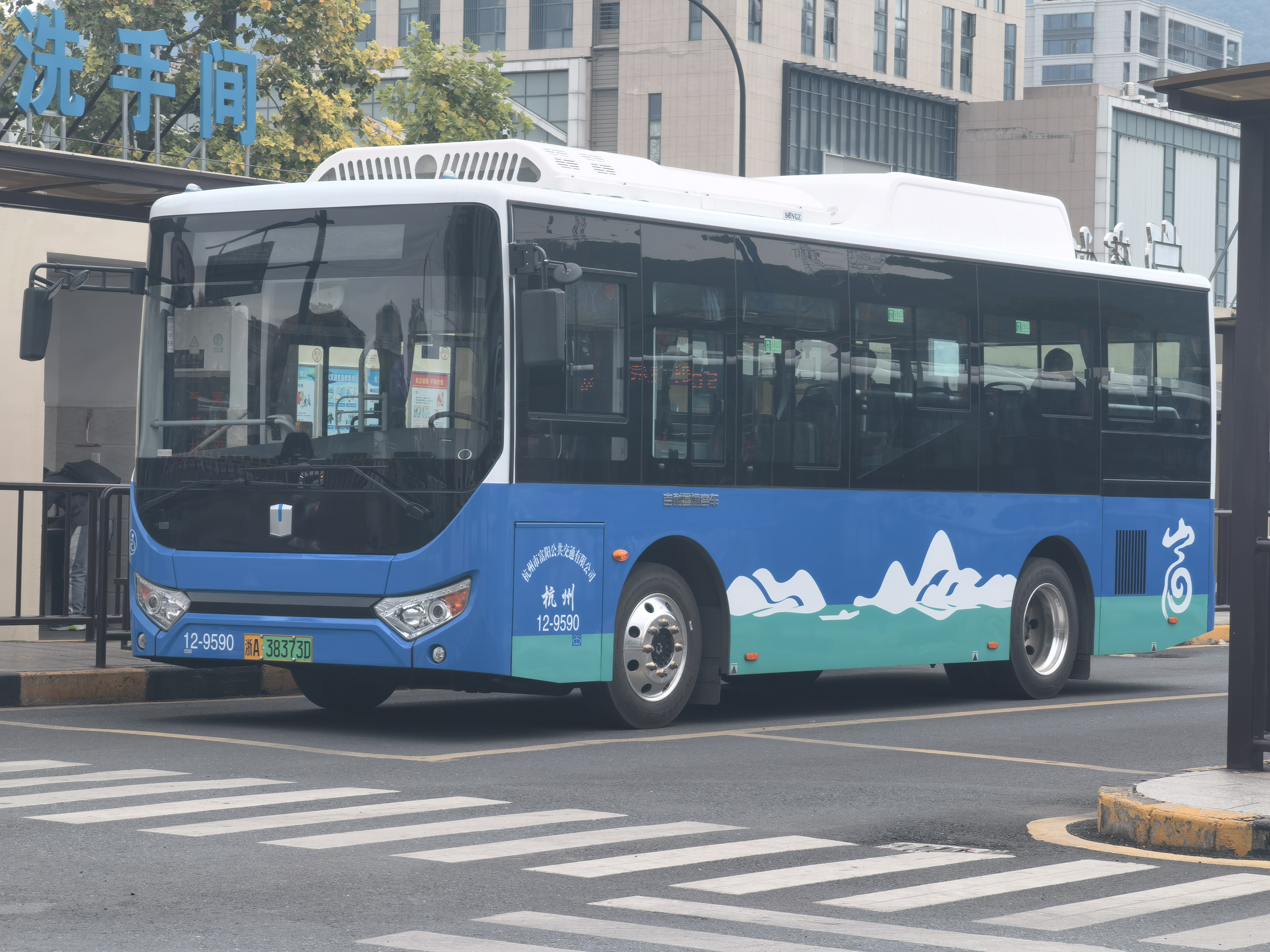
Farizon Xingji C8E

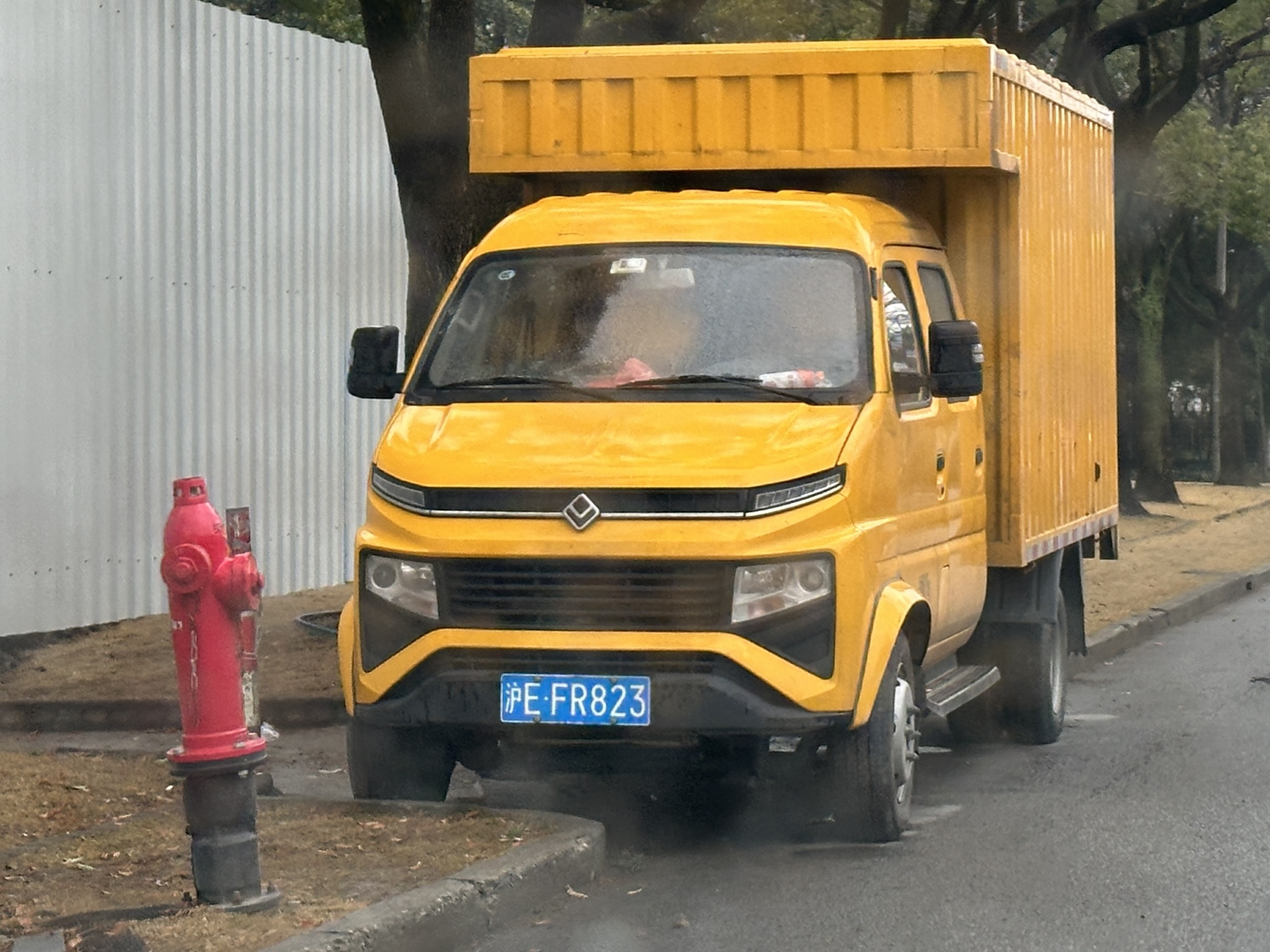
Ouling Fengrui F3

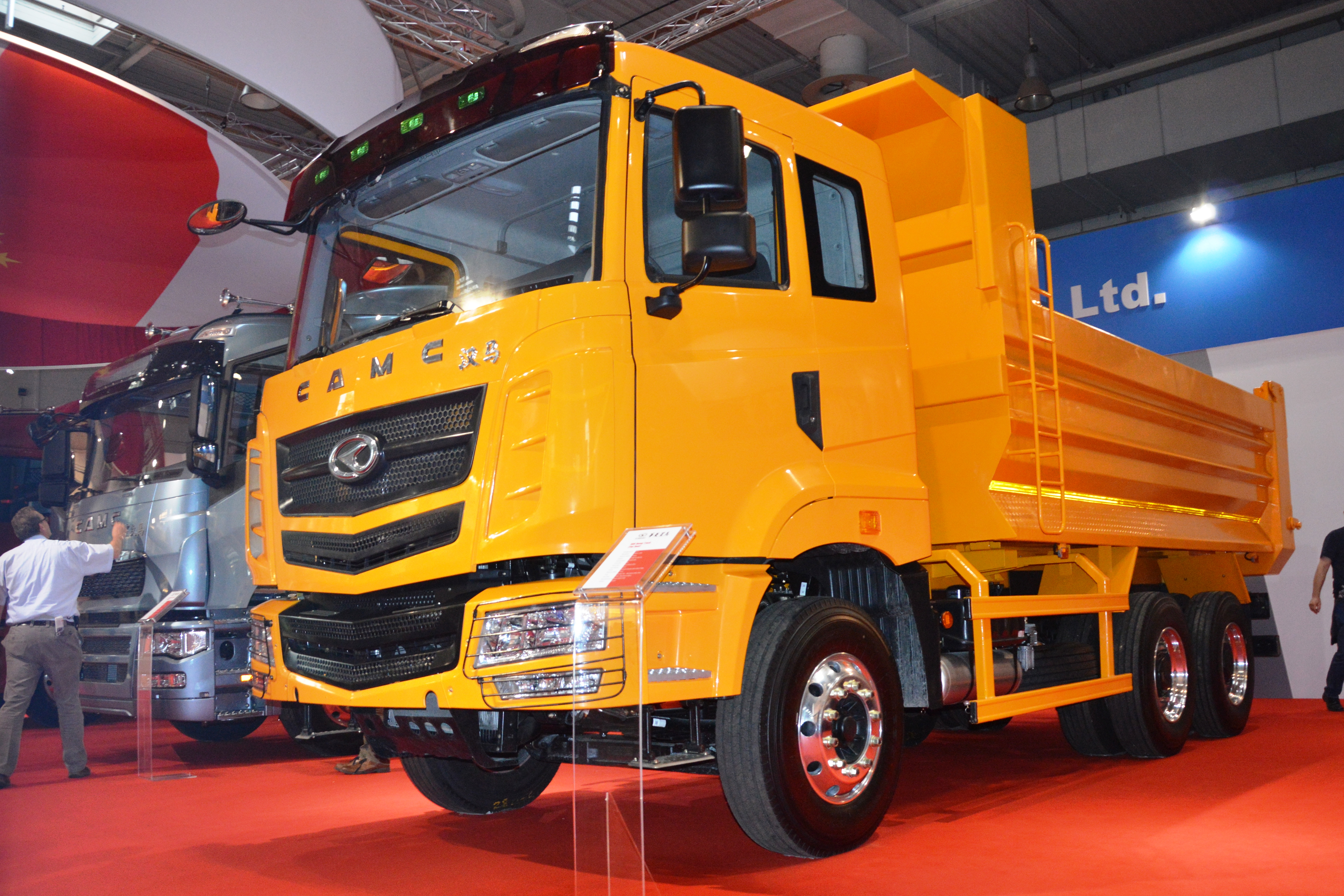
CAMC H08 dump truck

==== Smart ====
In 2019, Mercedes-Benz and ZGH revived the Smart brand as a global joint venture, targeted at producing battery electric vehicles in China and selling them globally. In 2022, the joint venture launched its first model, the Smart #1.

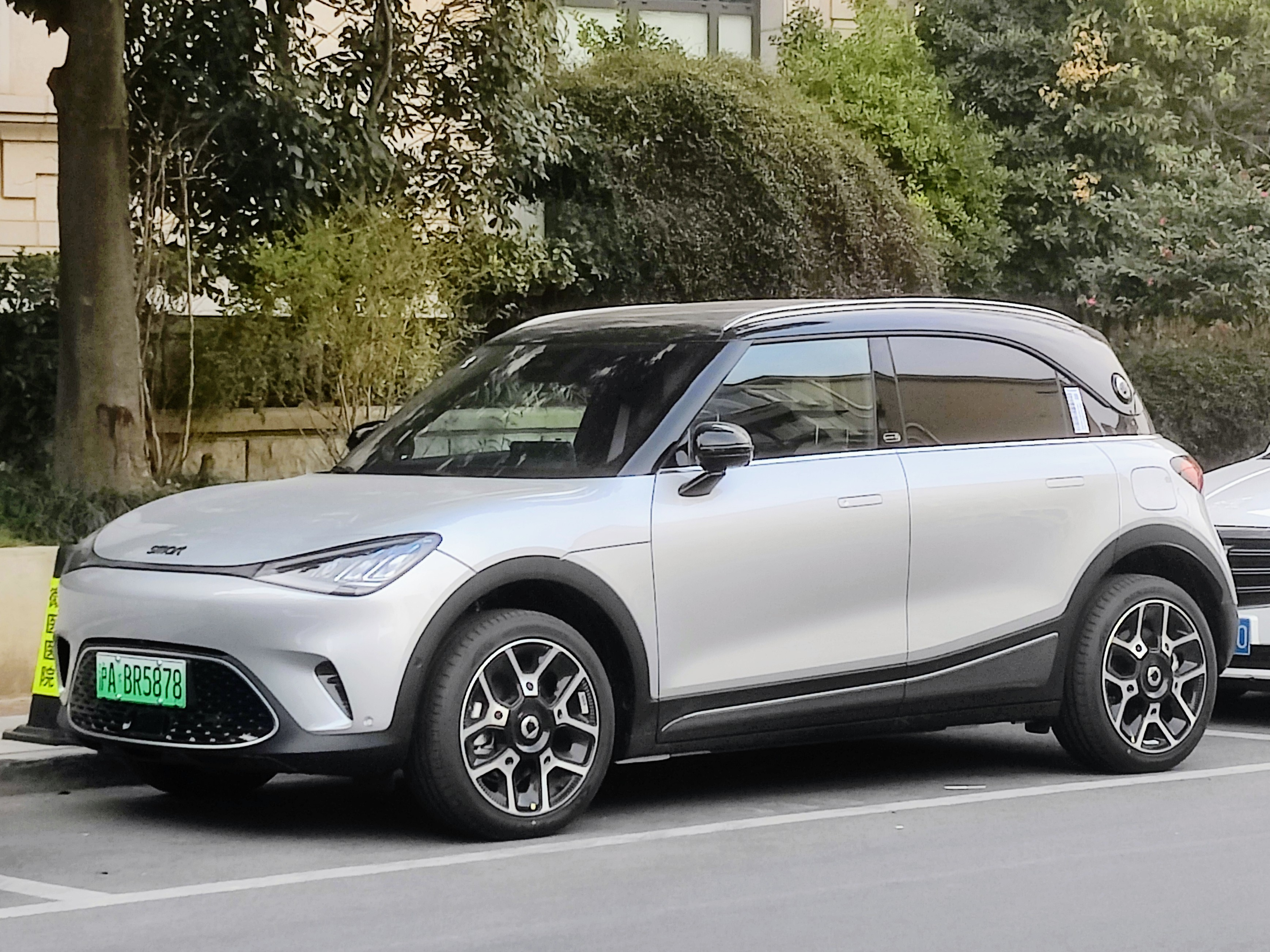
Smart #1

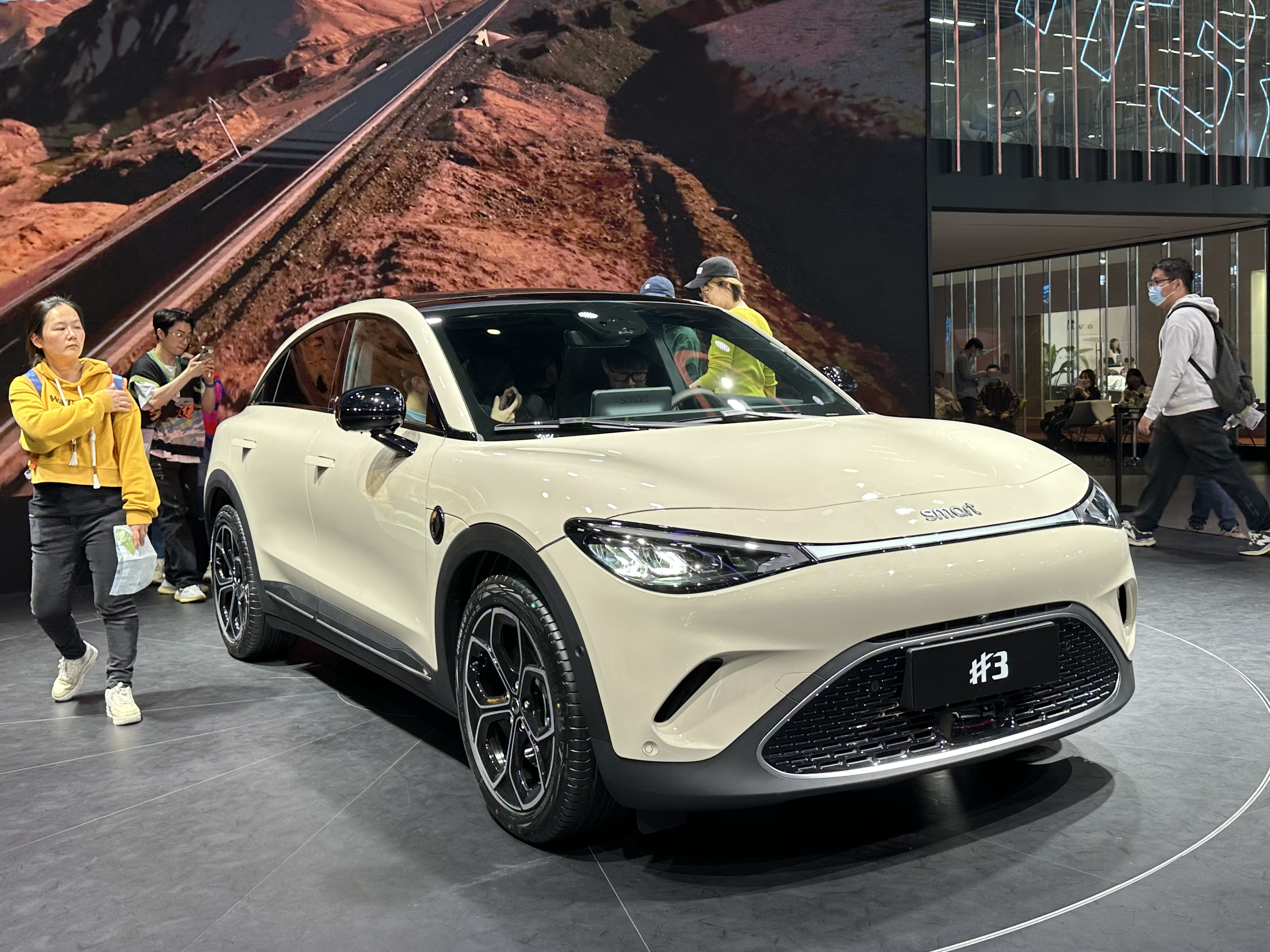
Smart #3

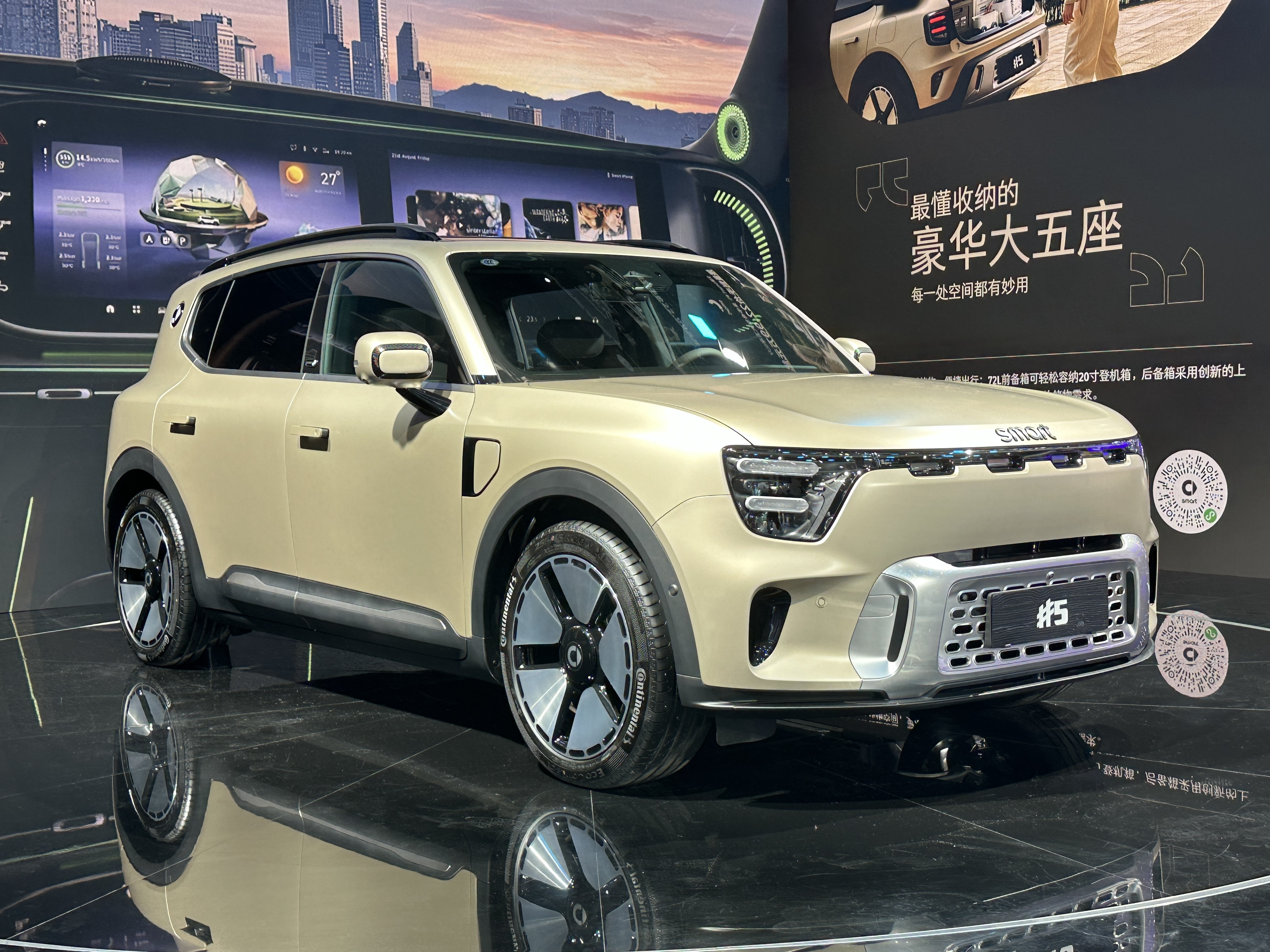
Smart #5

=== Discontinued automobile brands ===
==== Ji Yue / Jidu Auto ====
Jidu Auto (Chinese: 集度) is a joint venture between ZGH and Baidu that would be engaged in the production of electric vehicles in different segments starting in 2022. Jidu Auto is owned 55% by Baidu and 45% by Geely.

The Ji Yue (Chinese: 极越) brand was established in August 2023 as the second collaboration between ZGH and Baidu. Ji Yue is 65% owned by ZGH and 35% by Baidu, making it a subsidiary of ZGH. Due to Chinese government policies, Baidu, as the controlling company of Jidu, could not obtain the qualification to manufacture cars. Establishing Ji Yue allowed ZGH to be the controlling company, circumventing these restrictions. Jidu Auto has since become a technology solutions company focused on developing AI driving technology for Ji Yue and will no longer operate as an independent car brand. With the launch of the new Ji Yue brand, the previous Jidu Robo-01 was renamed Ji Yue 01, and the Ji Yue brand inherited the logo originally created for Jidu Auto.

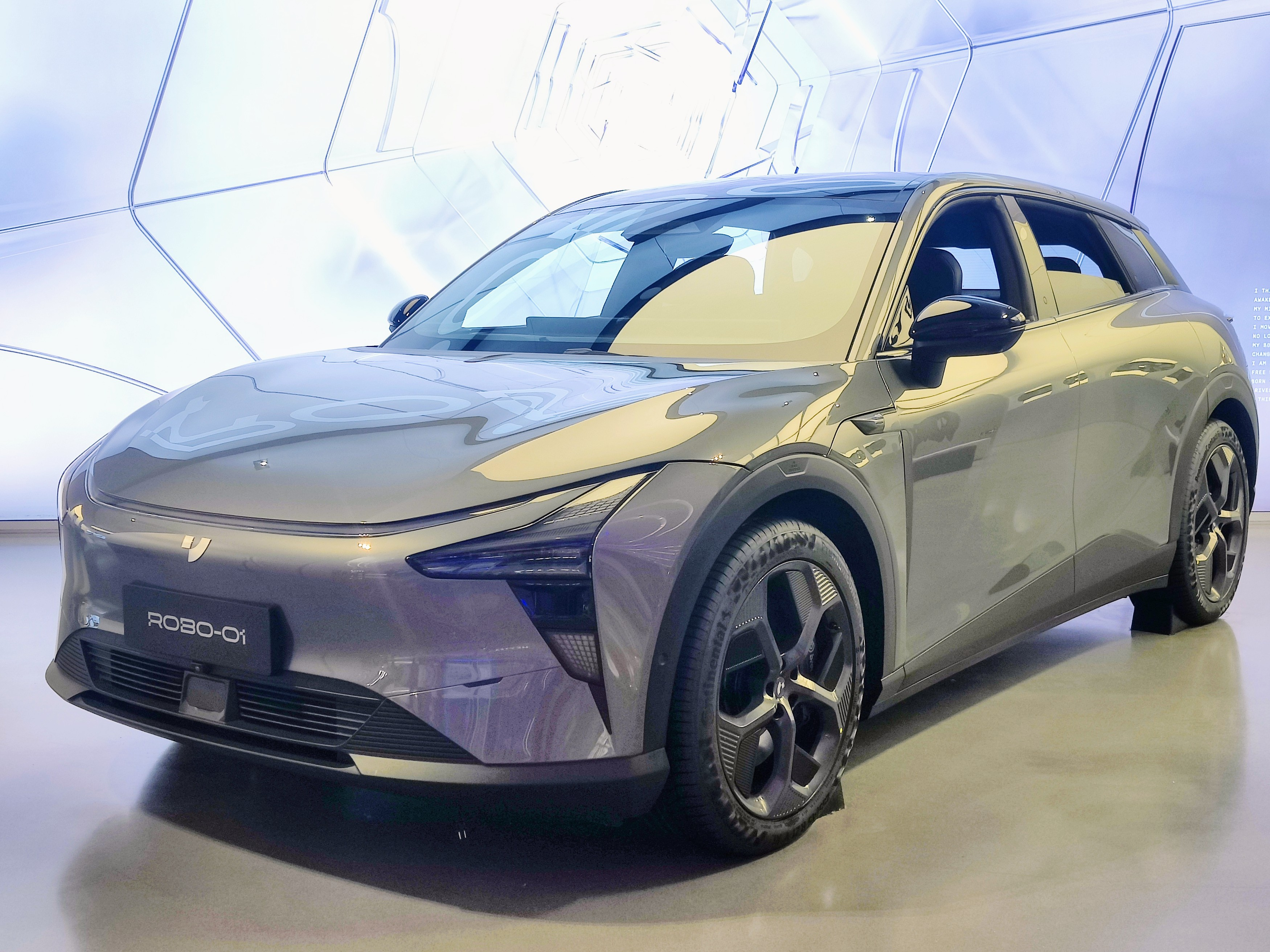
Ji Yue 01

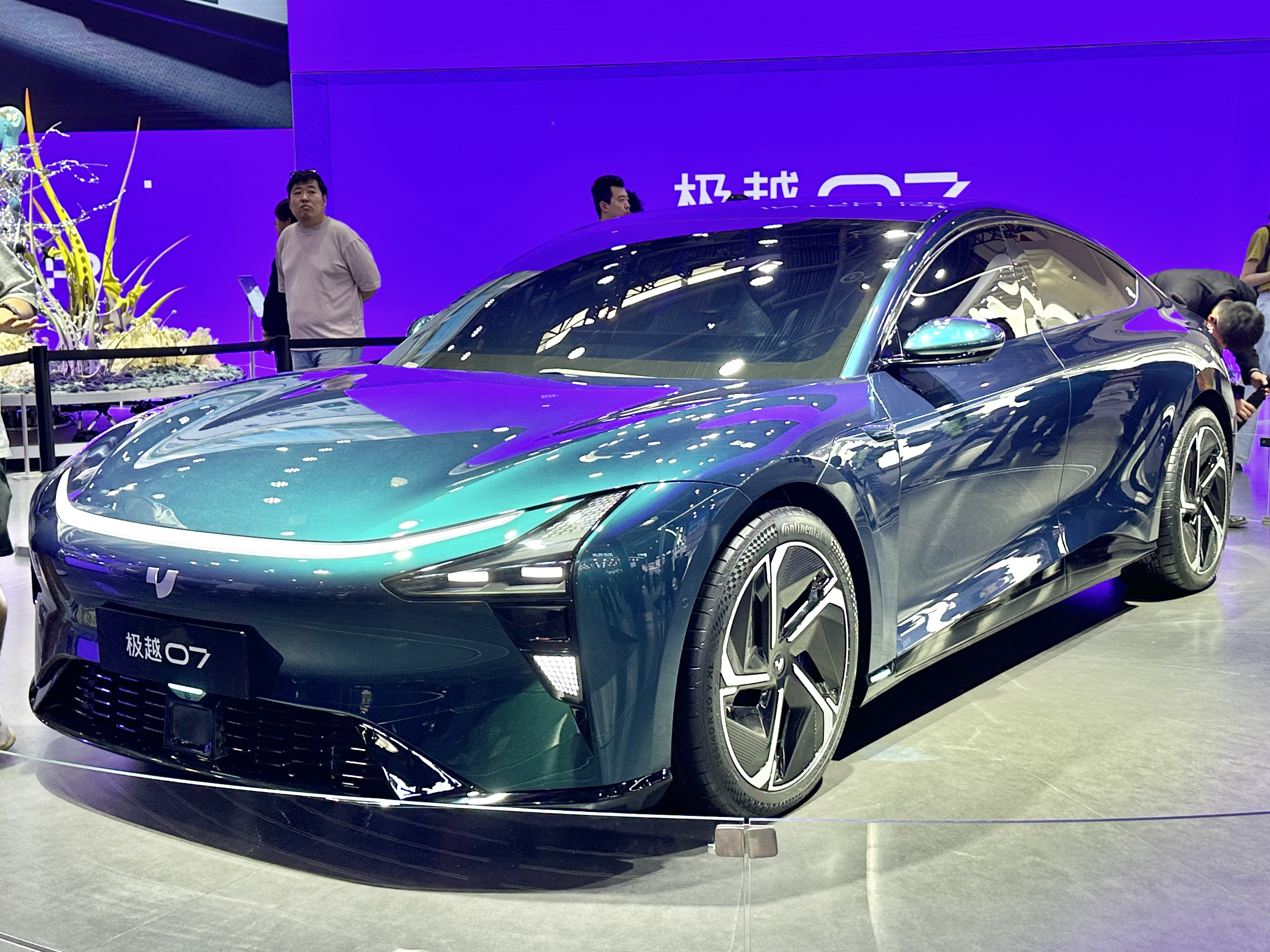
Ji Yue 07

==== Geely Geometry ====
Geely Geometry (Chinese: 吉利几何) is the battery electric vehicle range of Geely-based cars. Previously independent, the Geometry brand that was established in 2019 was consolidated into Geely Auto as an entry-level battery electric product series in March 2023. In October 2024, the brand was merged into Geely Galaxy, becoming a "smart boutique small car series" within Geely Galaxy.

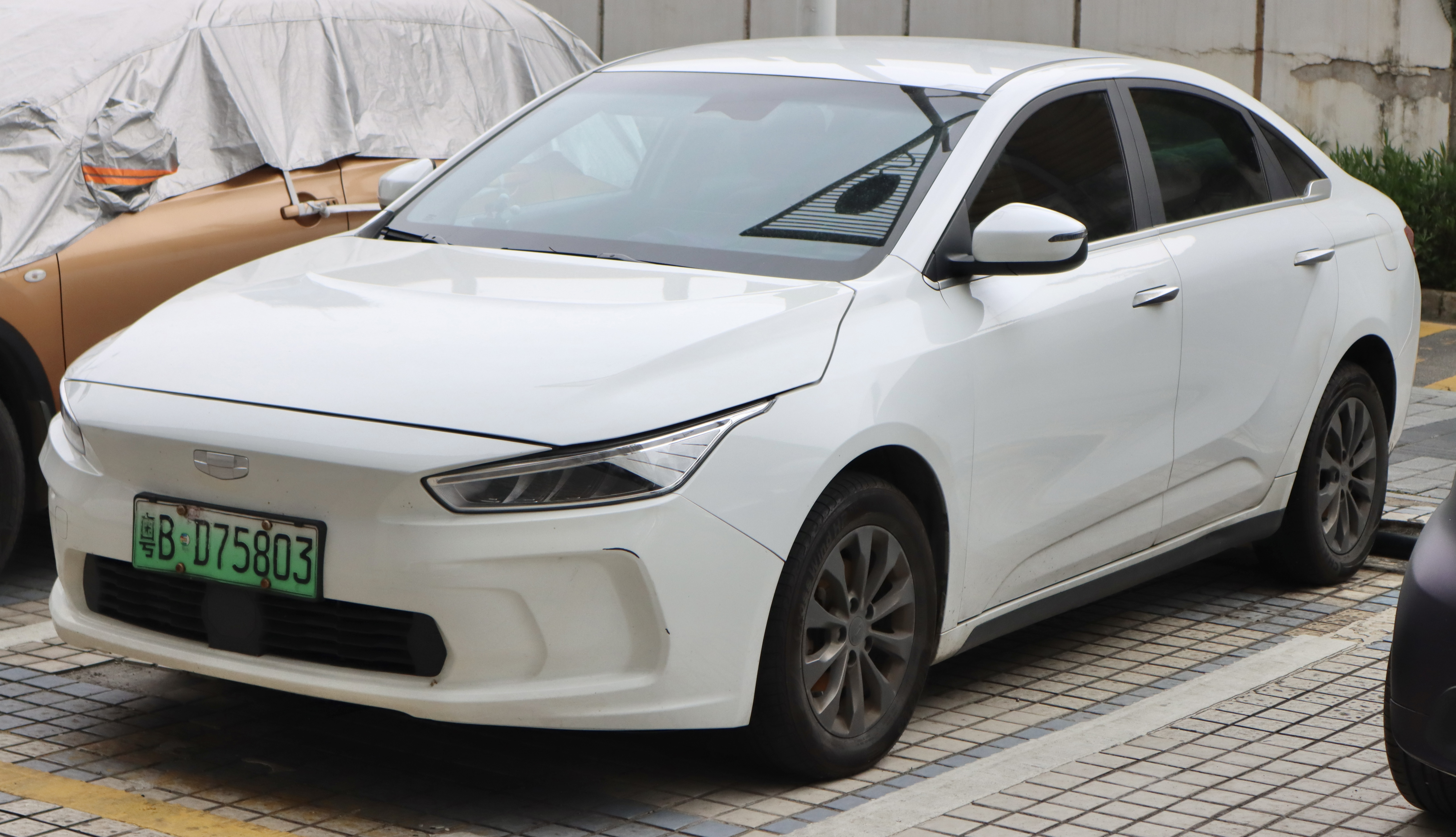
Geometry A

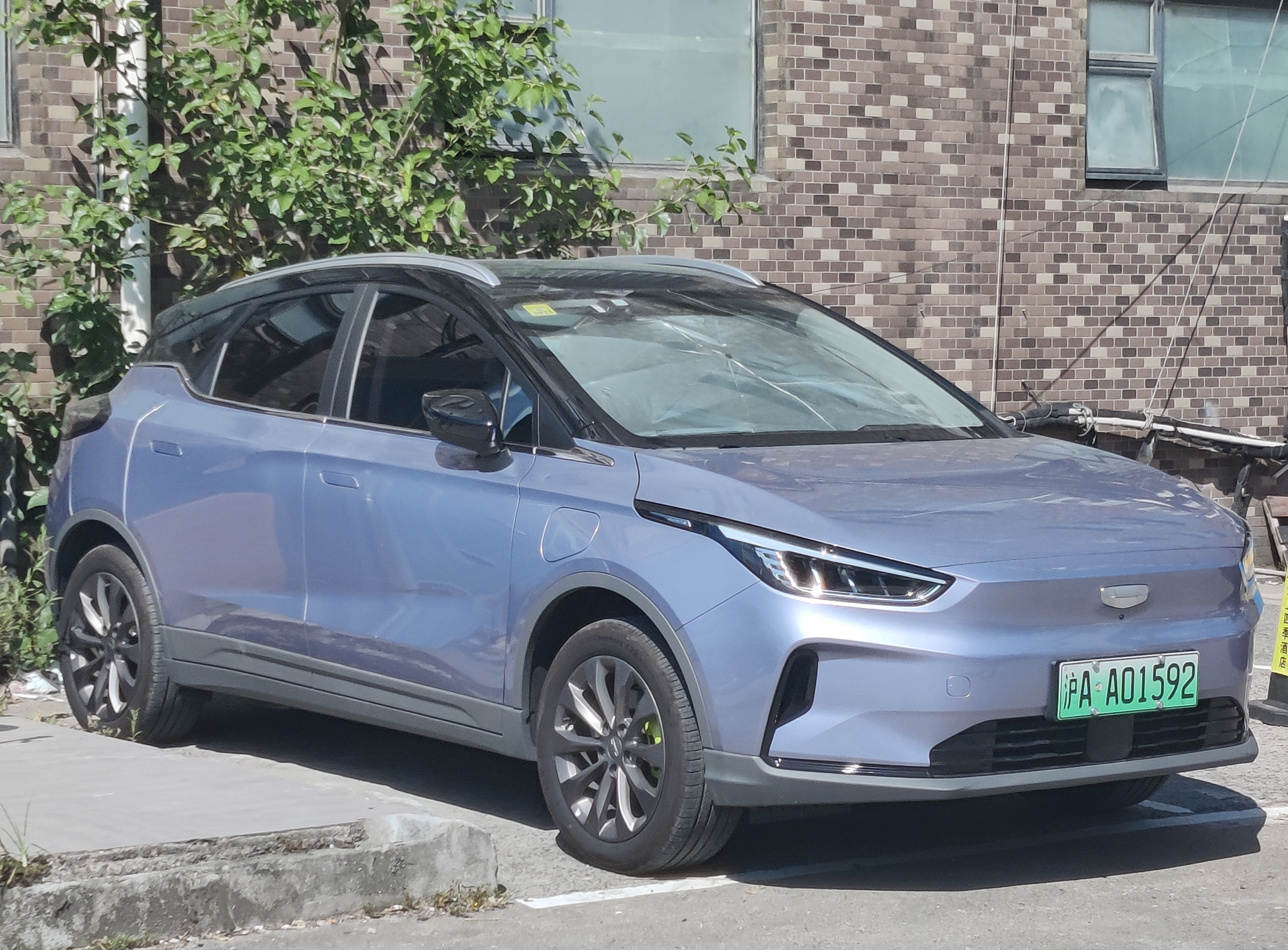
Geometry C

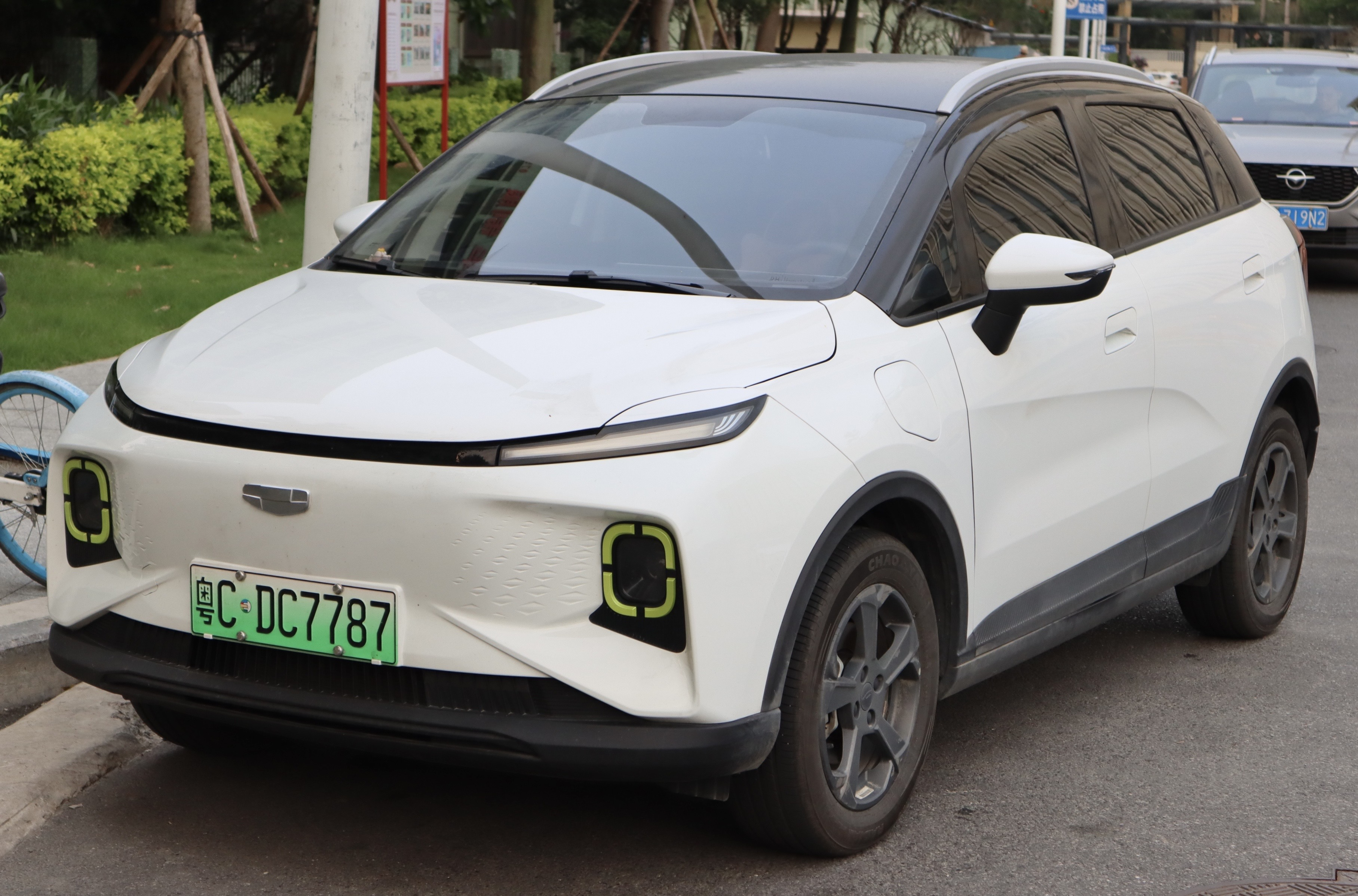
Geometry E

==== Emgrand ====
Emgrand (Chinese: 帝豪) was launched in 2009 as a medium- to high-end luxury brand. In 2014, Emgrand ceased to be a standalone brand, and Emgrand became a sub-brand of Geely, which itself adopted an updated version of the Emgrand logo.

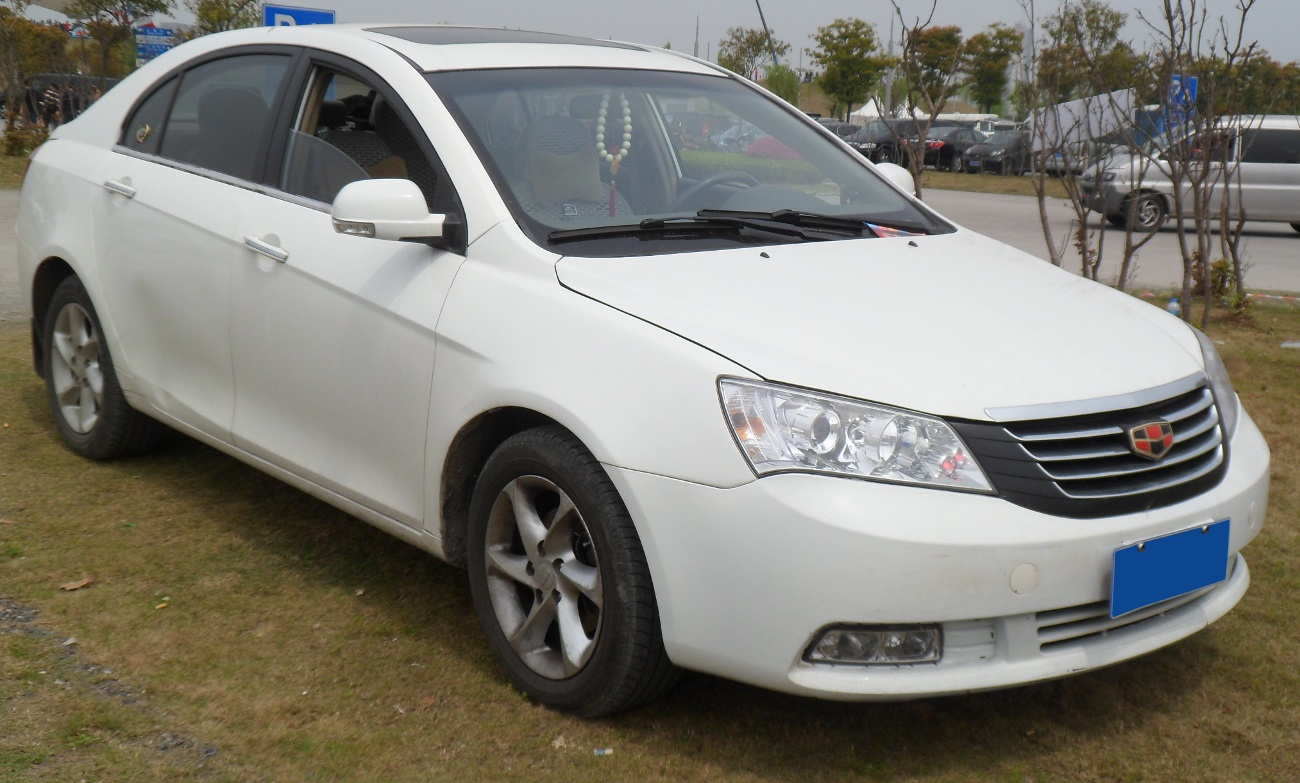
Emgrand EC7

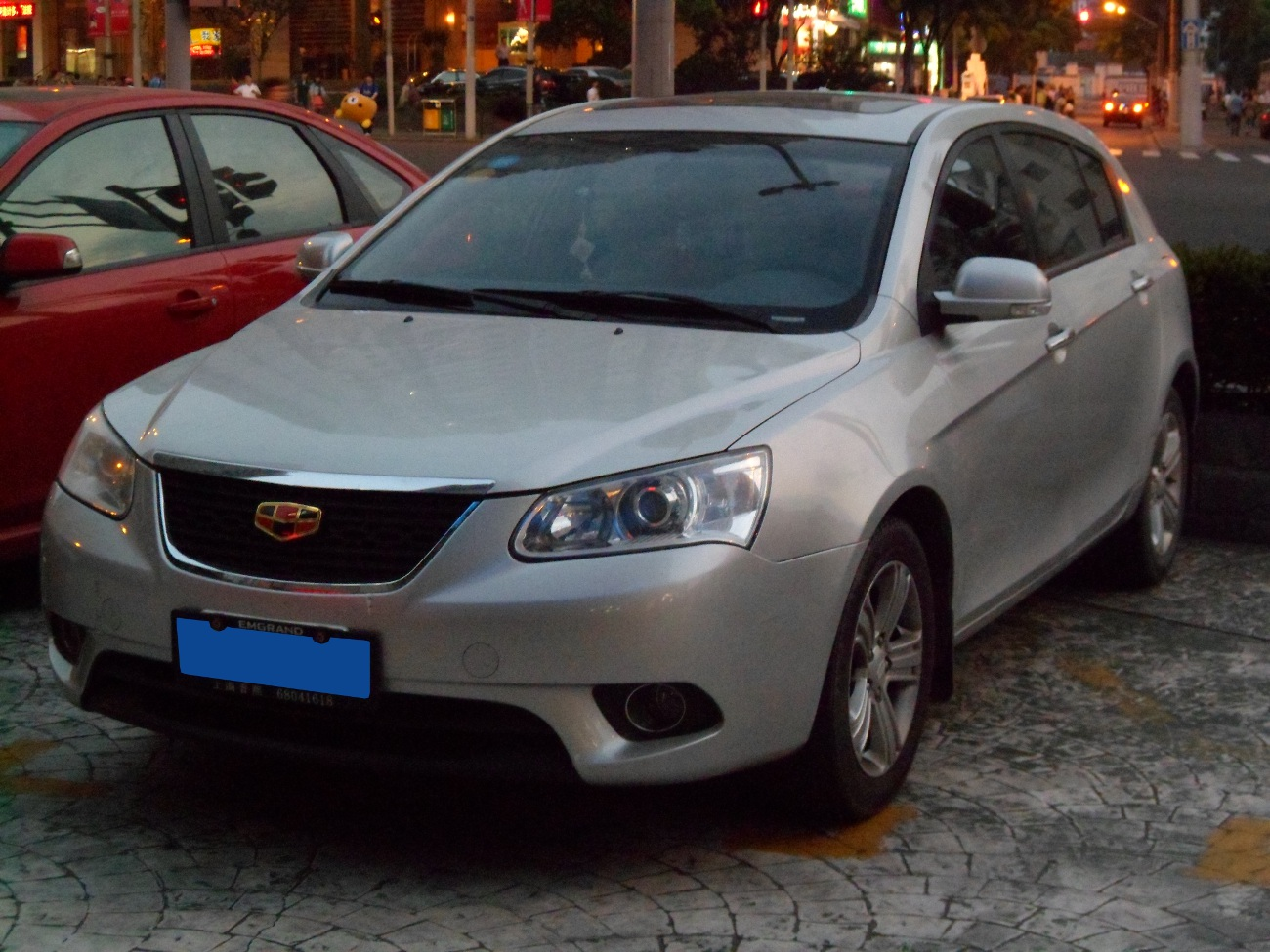
Emgrand EC7-RV

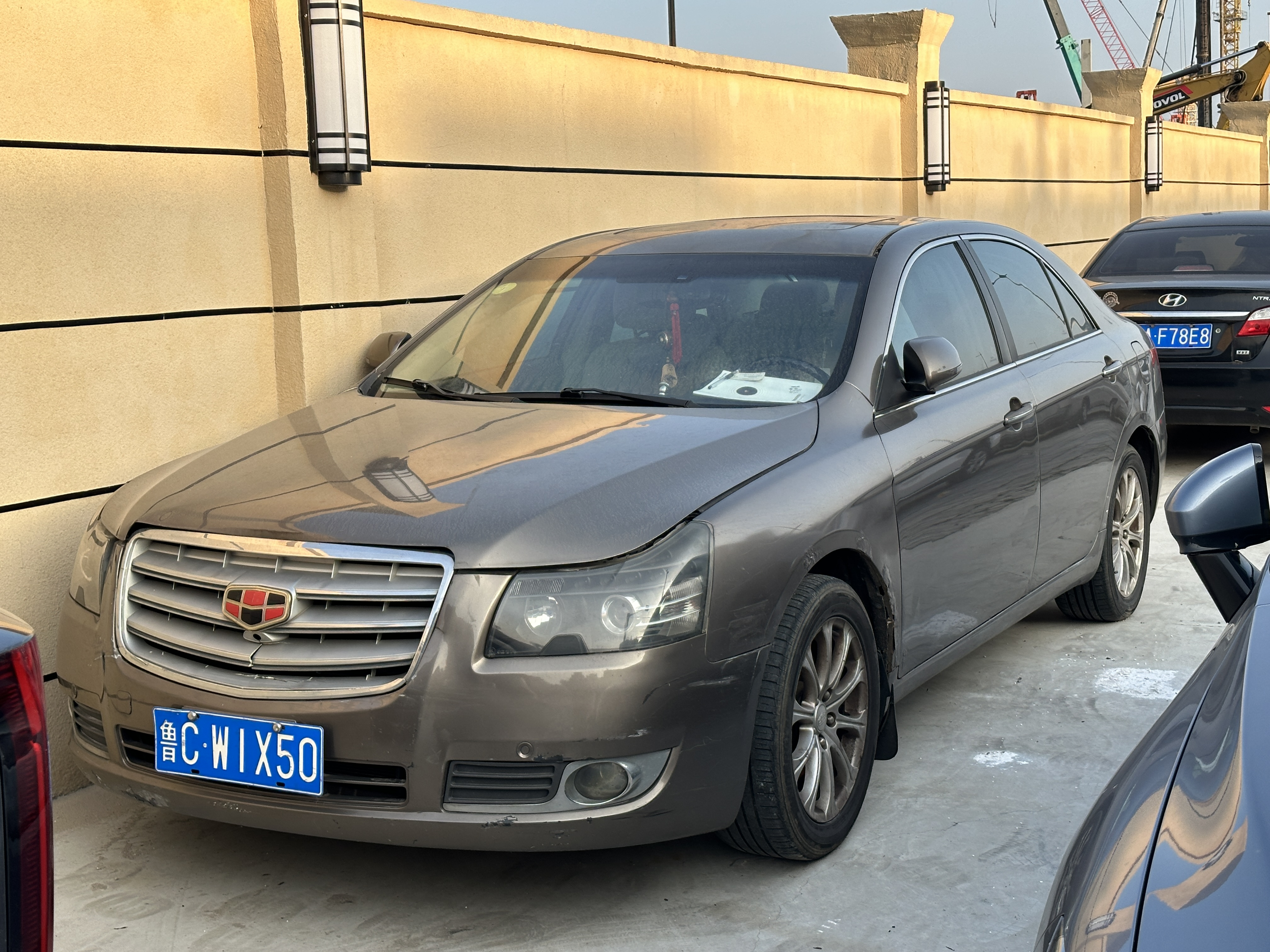
Emgrand EC8

==== Englon ====
Englon (Chinese: 英伦) was launched in 2010 to replace the Shanghai Maple brand. Geely claimed Englon emulated classic, British styled cars. Some of its cars were built by Geely subsidiary Shanghai LTI. As Geely fully acquired The London Taxi Company in 2013, the emblem of Englon also became the new logo of The London Taxi Company.

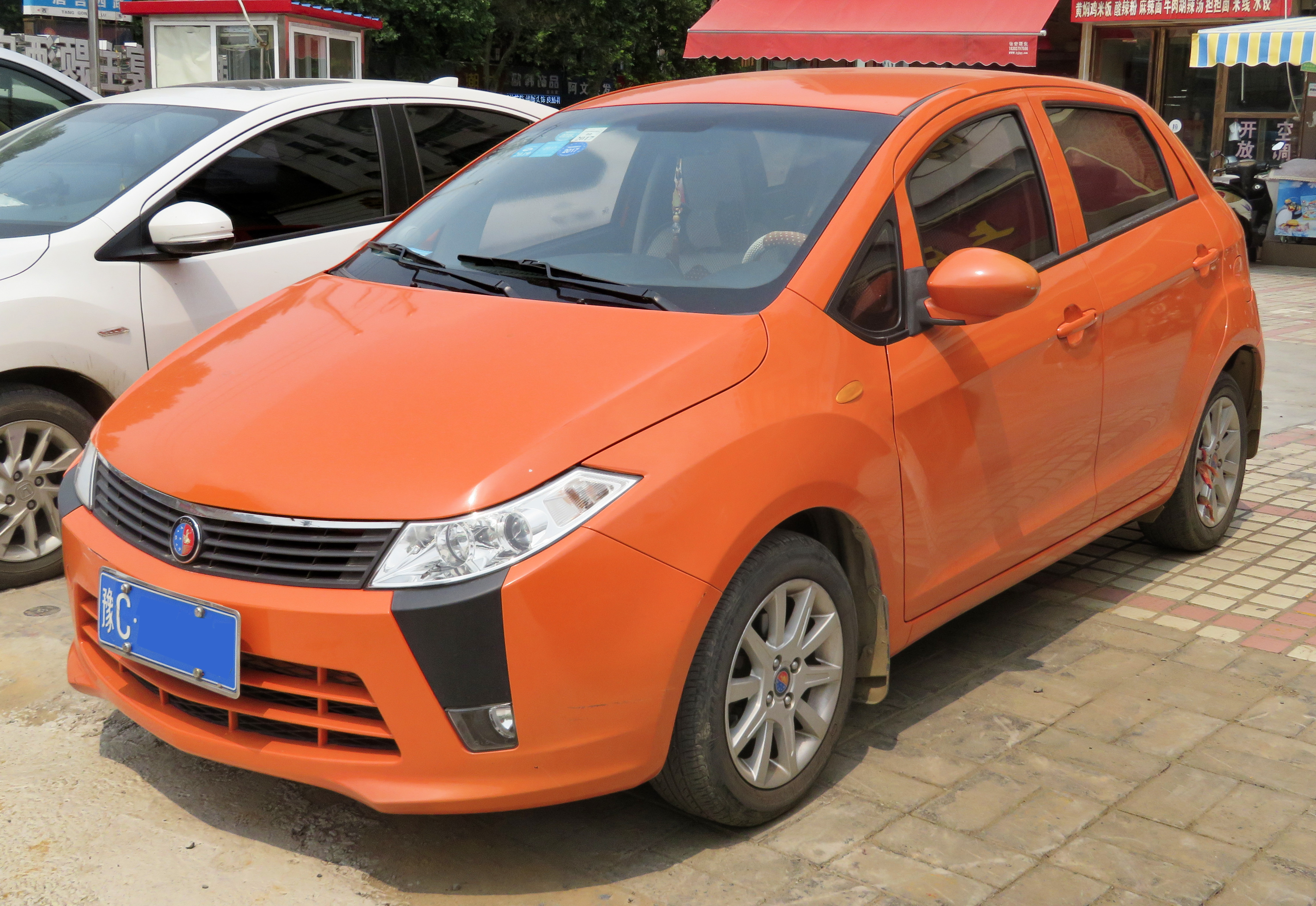
Englon SC5-RV

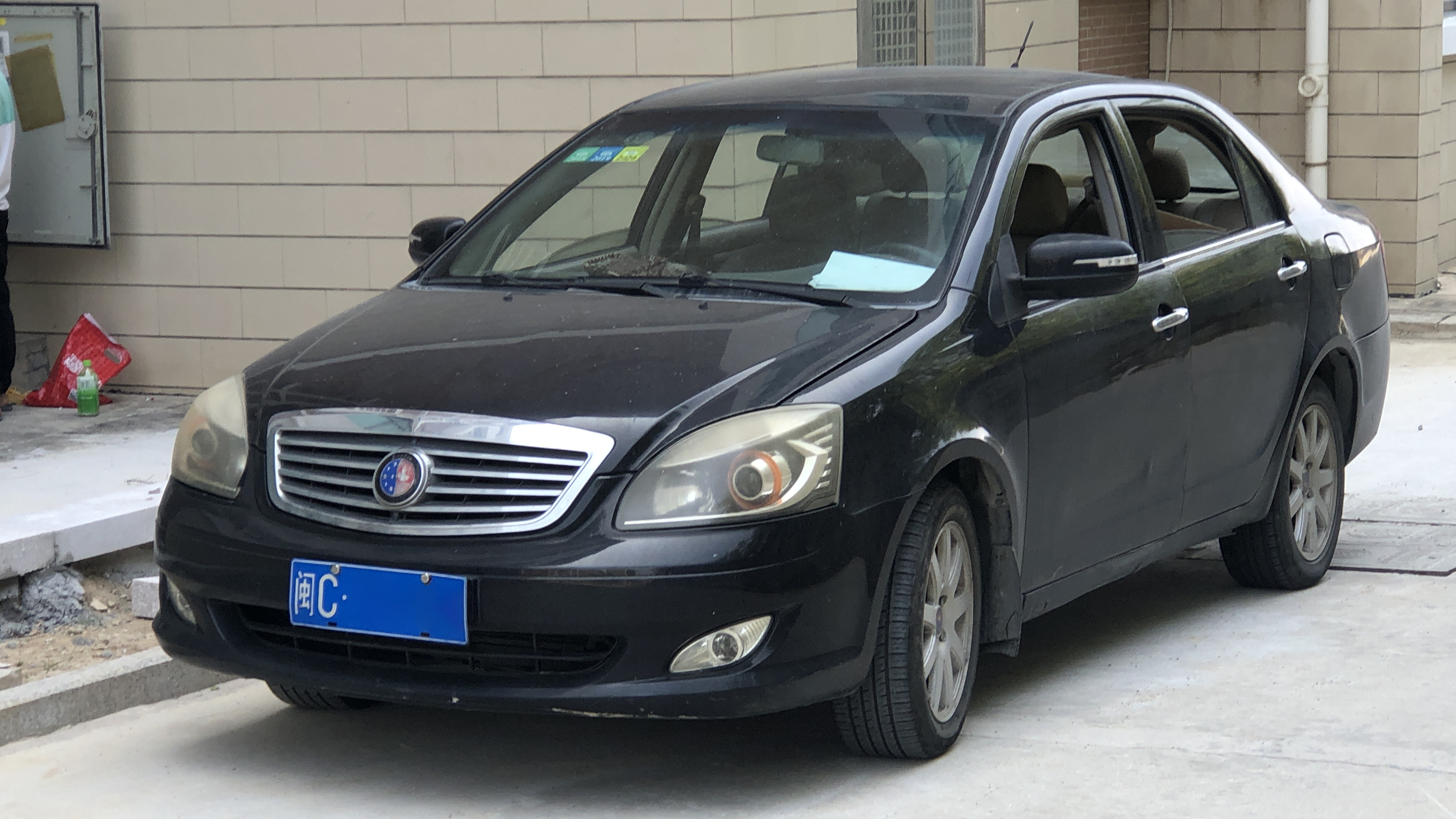
Englon SC7

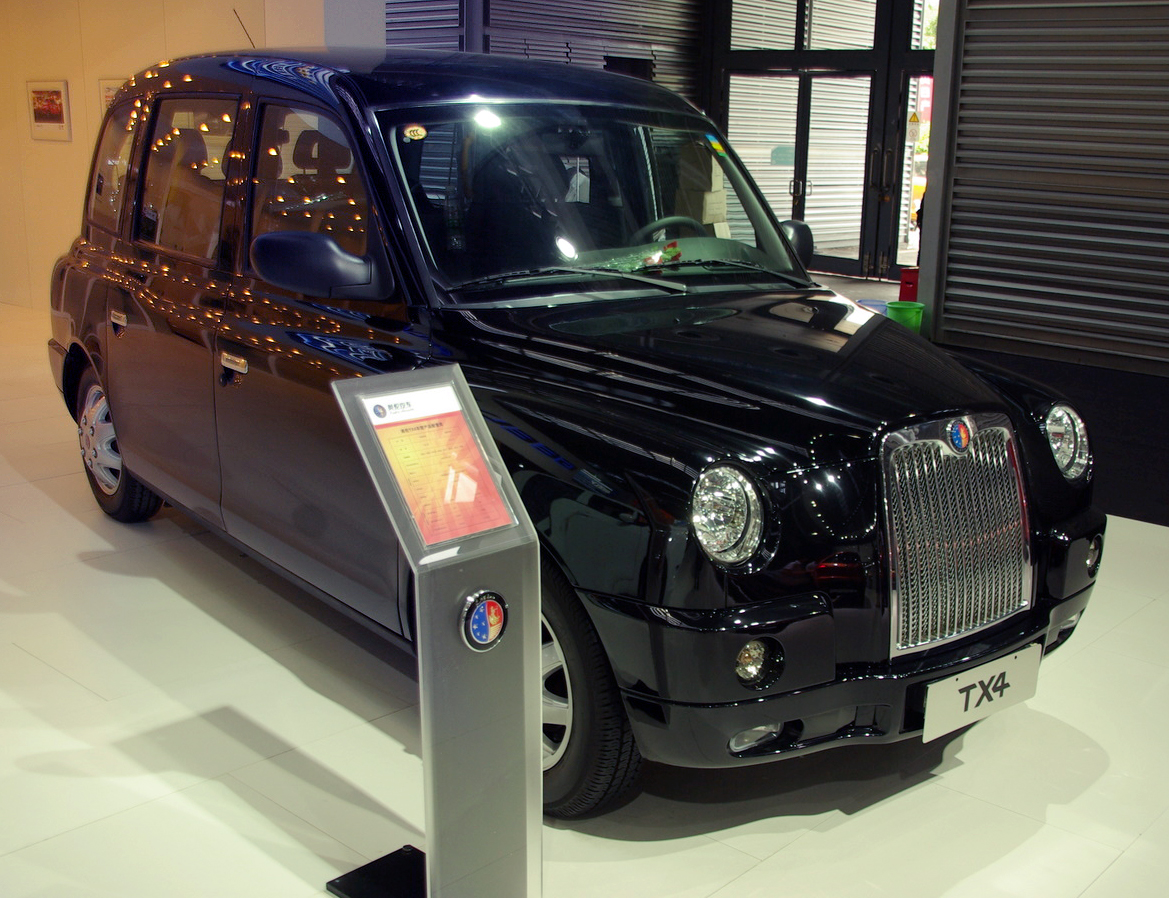
Englon TX4

==== Gleagle ====
Gleagle (Chinese: 全球鹰) was Geely's entry-level brand sold between 2010 and 2015. Some Gleagle cars, such as the Gleagle Panda, were available for sale on the internet in China via the Taobao Mall, a popular e-commerce site. While Geely would deliver the car to the customer's address, buying one of the Panda models on offer did necessitate a trip to a traditional dealer. This sub-brand was discontinued in 2015. Most Gleagle products continued to be sold directly under the Geely brand.

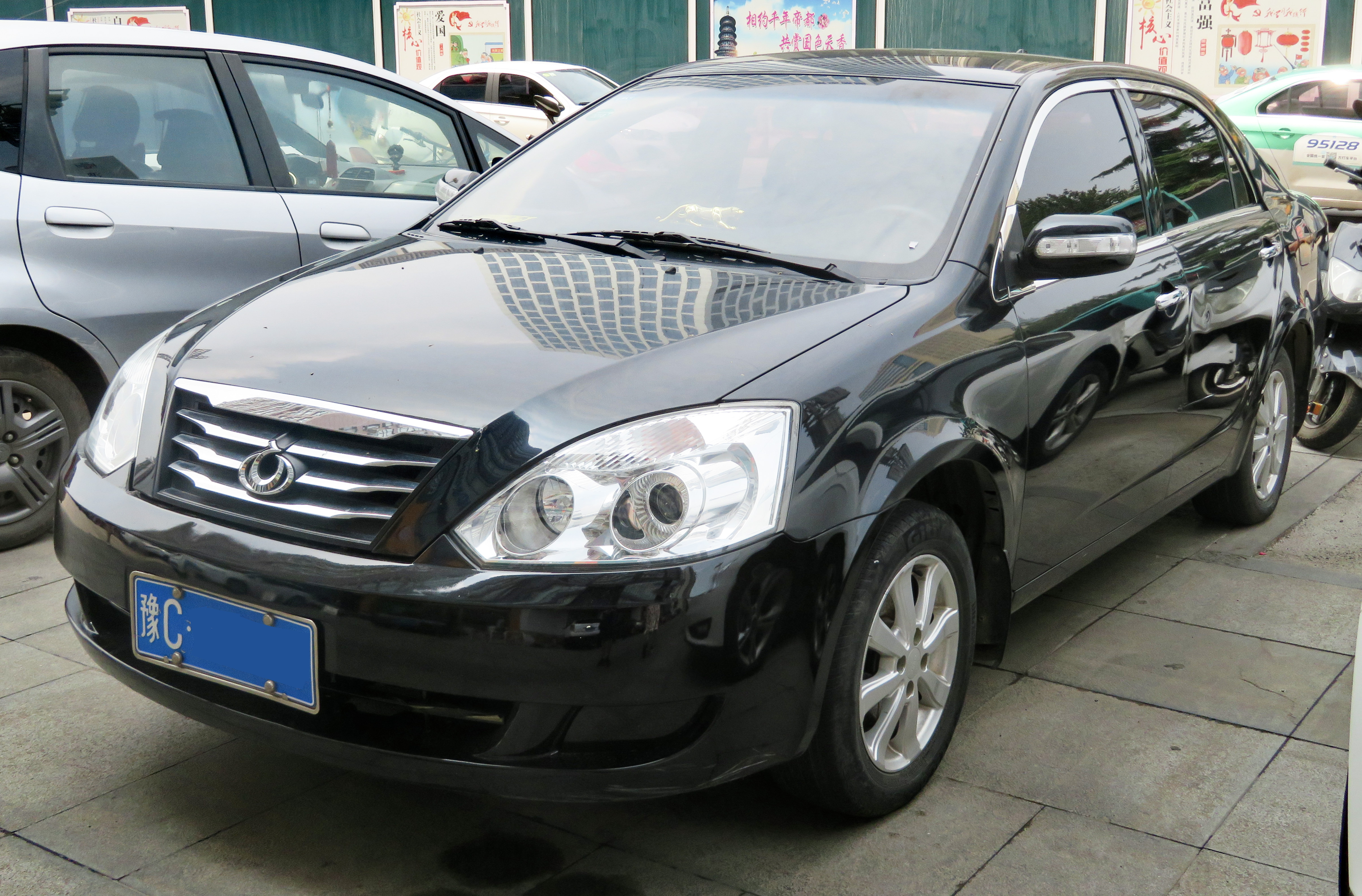
Gleagle GC7

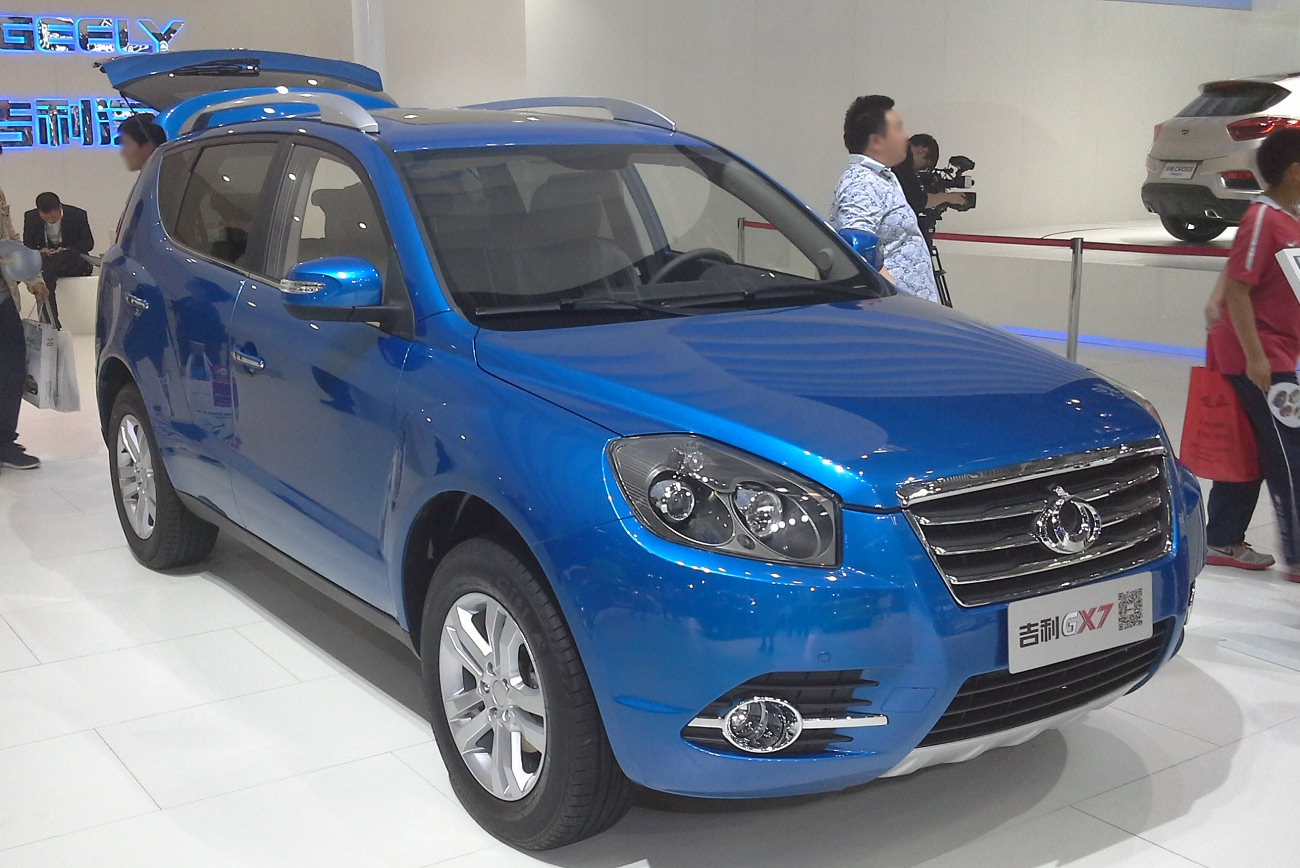
Gleagle GX7

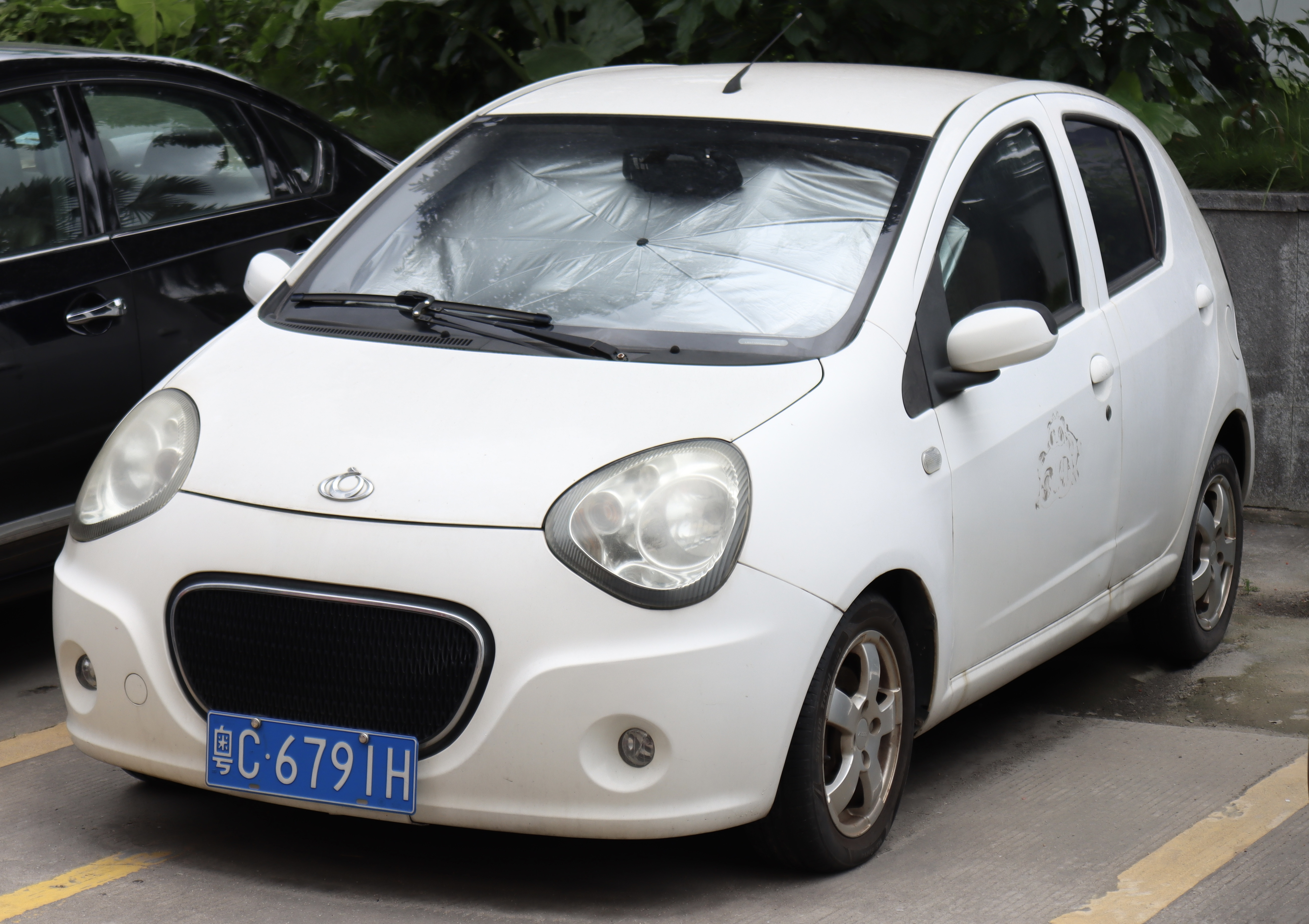
Gleagle Panda

==== Zhidou ====
Zhidou (Chinese: 知豆) Zhidou Auto or ZD Auto brand specialized in microcars. The brand was discontinued since 2021. In March 2022, real estate developer Yinyi Shares announced its participation in the restructuring of Zhidou Automobile. But it ended in nothing. Instead, Geely and Aima Technology Group restructured Zhidou from bankruptcy. Operation was reportedly restarted in 2024 by introduced the new electric microcar model called Zhidou Rainbow. Since then, the name Zhidou is also spelled as Zhido.

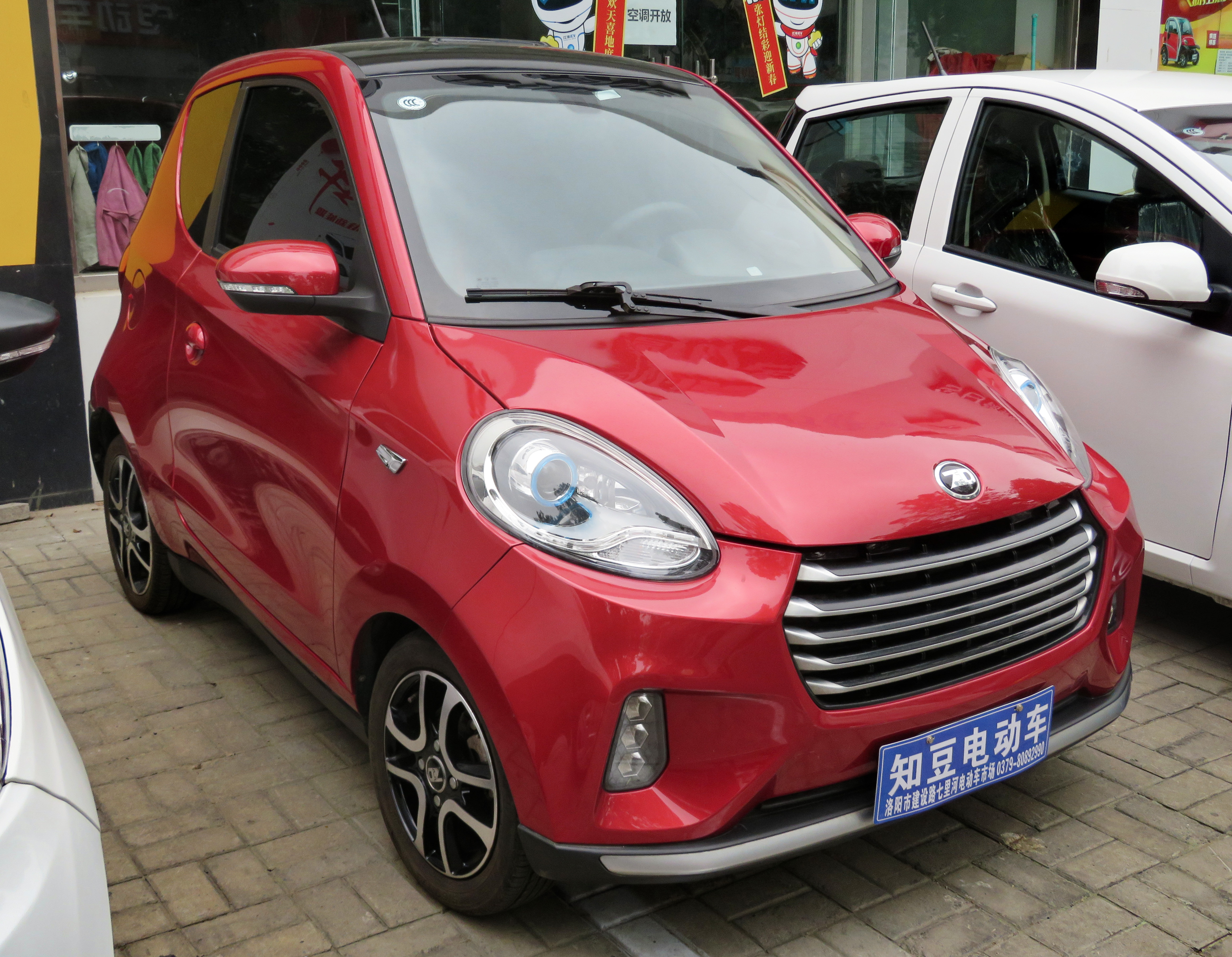
Zhidou D2S

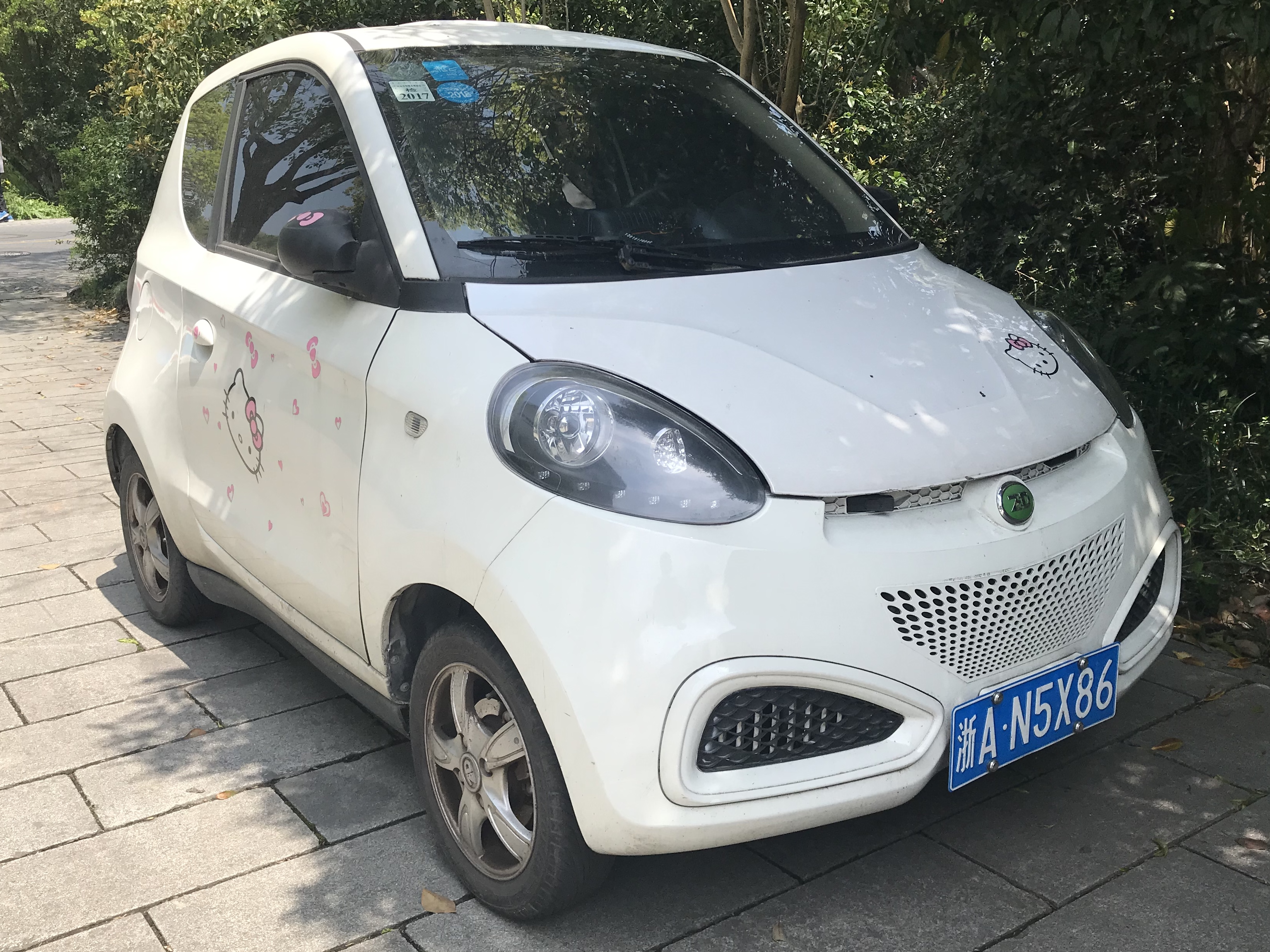
Zhidou D1

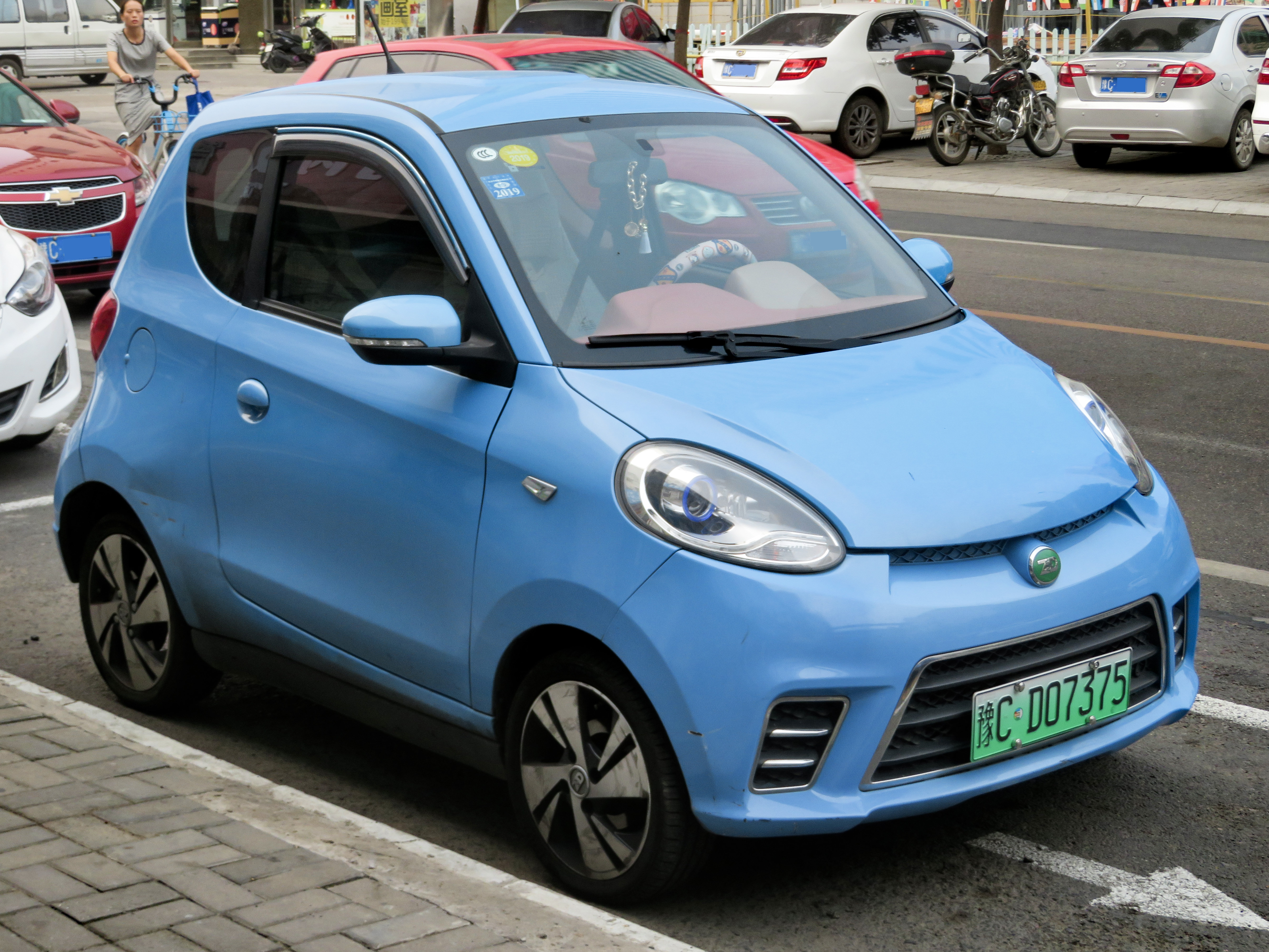
Zhidou D2

=== Motorcycle brands ===
==== Qianjiang Motorcycle ====
Qianjiang Motorcycle is one of the largest manufacturers of two-wheeled vehicles in China. Since September 2016, the majority shareholding (29.8%) of the company has been controlled by the Geely Group. The vehicles are sold under four brands: QJiang, QJMotor, Benelli, Keeway Motors and KSR Moto.

==== Benelli ====
Benelli is a subsidiary that produces motorcycles and scooters. Design, development and marketing activities are carried out at the Benelli QJ headquarters in Pesaro, Italy, with production occurring in Wenling, China, for sale globally.

==== Geely Ming Industrial/Jiming ====
Zhejiang Geely Ming Industrial Co., Ltd., common known as Geely Ming, or GM Motor, is a motorcycle manufacturer subsidiary founded in 1995 with registered office in Zhejiang province. The vehicles are sold under two brands: Jiming and Geely Motorcycle.

== International investments and holdings ==
Mercedes-Benz Group (9.69% stake)

- In February 2018, Geely's founder and chairman Li Shufu acquired a 9.69% stake of Mercedes-Benz Group through the Tenaciou3 Prospect Investment Limited, making it the company's largest single shareholder.

Aston Martin (17% stake)

- In September 2022, Geely acquired a 7.6% stake in Aston Martin Lagonda.
- In May 2023, Geely increased its stake to 17%, becoming the third-largest shareholder after the Yew Tree consortium and the Saudi Arabia Public Investment Fund.

Volvo Group (6.8% stake)

- In 2017, Geely acquired an 8.2% stake of Volvo AB, which is also about 15% of votes.
- In January 2024, Geely announced to reduce its holdings in Volvo Group by US$685 million. The stake has been lowered from 8.2% to 6.8%. Despite the reduction, Geely remains the second-largest shareholder in Volvo Group.

Renault Korea (34.02% stake)

- In 2022, Geely invested over US$200 million to acquire a 34.02% stake in a joint venture in South Korea between Renault and the Samsung Group. The company plans to produce vehicles based on the Geely's Compact Modular Architecture platform, initially intended for the Korean domestic market.

Renault Geely do Brasil (26.4% stake)

- In June 2025, Geely Auto, Geely Holding and Renault announced to establish a joint venture to manufacture electric vehicles in Brazil. The JV company would be owned 73.57% by Renault, 21.29% by Geely Auto, 5.11% by Geely Holding, and 0.03% by an independent third party.
- In November 2025, Geely formally acquired a 26.4% stake in Renault do Brasil, with Renault Group remaining the majority shareholder and continuing to consolidate the entity in its accounts. Renault do Brasil will produce Geely Auto branded vehicles alongside Renault vehicles at the Ayrton Senna plant in São José dos Pinhais, Paraná. On 19th November, Renault and Geely announced to invest 3.8 billion reais (US$714 million) to the joint venture and renamed it to Renault Geely do Brasil.

Ford España (34% stake)

- In July 2026, Geely and Ford announced to establish a manufacturing joint venture at Ford's Valencia plant in Spain. The joint venture will be hold 66 % by Ford and 34% by Geely plan to produce Ford-branded vehicles based on the Geely platform and Geely-branded vehicles.

Horse Powertrain (45% stake)

- In 2022, Geely and Renault established a joint venture at 50:50, to manufacture internal combustion engine (ICE) and hybrid powertrains for Renault, Nissan and Mitsubishi vehicles with Geely's technology.
- In 2024, Saudi Aramco acquired 10% of Horse Powertrain, with Geely and Renault's stake each diluted to 45%.

BelGee (33.47% stake)

- In 2011, BelGee was established by Geely and the Belarusian state-owned company BelAZ, to produce Geely and Geely-based vehicles. The company was 58.162% owned by BelAZ and 36.092% by Geely.
- In 2021, the joint venture was restructured. It was invested by government of Shenzhen and CITIC Group. The government of Belarus acquired all the share of BelAZ. After the restructuring, the company was 51.49% owned by Belarus state, 33.47% by Geely, 9.01% by government of Shenzhen, and 6.03% by CITIC Group.

Drivetrain Systems International (divested)

- In 2009, Geely bought Drivetrain Systems International Pty Ltd, a global transmission developer headquartered in Australia.
- In 2015, Geely sold DSI to a Chinese investment company Shuanglin, which continue to manufacture the DSI designed products in Xiangtan, Jining and Ninghai.

== Non-automotive businesses ==
=== Geely Technology Group ===
- Caocao Chuxing (曹操出行) – Caocao Chuxing is a ride-hailing service that was developed by Hangzhou Youxing Technology Company and majority owned by ZGH. It is the first Chinese new energy-focused mobility service.
- Terrafugia – Terrafugia was founded in 2006 targeting at roadable aircraft. The company was acquired in full by ZGH in 2017.
- Zhejiang Qianjiang Motorcycle Group Co – Qianjiang Motorcycle (钱江摩托) was majority acquired by ZGH in 2016. The company is one of the largest producers of motorcycles in China and owns several renowned brands including Italy's Benelli. It is also known for its lithium battery technology.
- Geespace plans to create a network of low earth orbit satellites that will send precise positioning information to self-driving cars.

=== Mitime Group ===
Mitime Group was established in 2004 and is affiliated to ZGH. It focuses on investment and operation management of higher education, sports, cultural tourism and other businesses. The group consists of three departments: Mitime Speedpark, Mitime Sports and Mitime Cultural Tourism.

- Mitime Speedpark – Investment and development of motor speedparks around the world. They have already constructed multiple race circuits in China and abroad and currently operate tracks in Ningbo, Chengdu, and North America.
- Mitime Motorsports – Mitime constructs and operates race tracks for automobiles, motorcycles, and karts around the world. Mitime also organizes motorsport events such as China F4 Championship.
- Mitime Tourism – Mitime facilitates tourism and manages hospitality services around its tracks.

=== Meizu ===
In June 2022, Geely acquired a majority stake of Meizu, a Chinese consumer electronics manufacturer based in Zhuhai, Guangdong.

=== Geely Talent Development Group ===
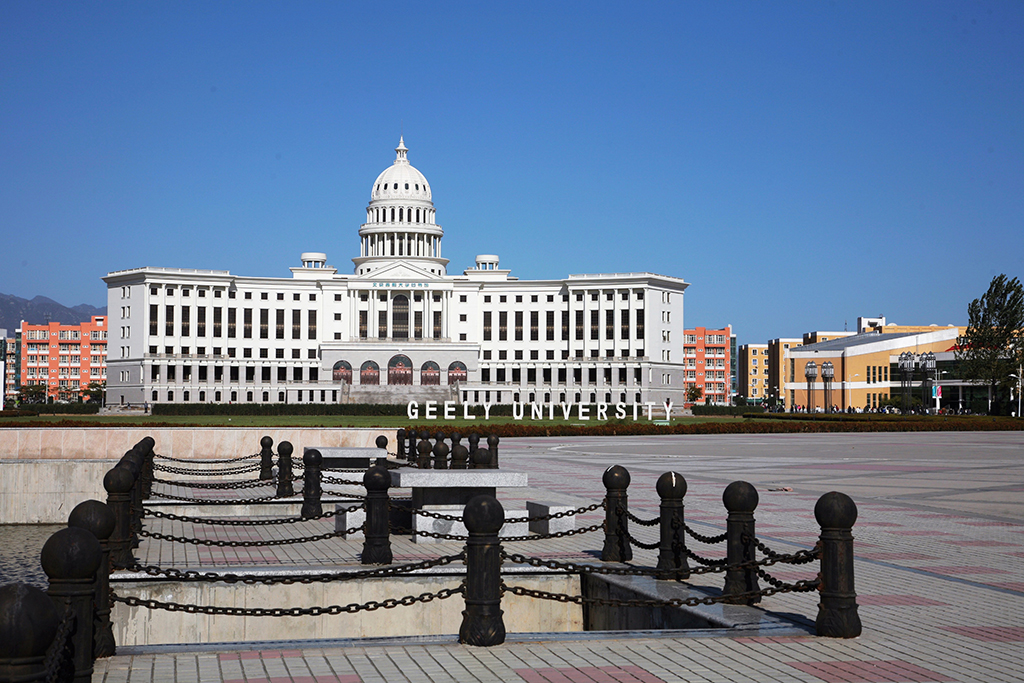
Beijing Geely University

Formerly named Mitime Education, a subsidiary of Mitime Group, the Geely Talent Development Group is the education branch of Geely to cultivate talents for the automotive industry. Geely has established 9 higher education institutions and more than 10,000 student graduate from Geely's schools each year.

- Geely University – a private university located in Chengdu
- University of Sanya – a private university located in Hainan
- Beijing Geely University – a private university located in Beijing
- Xiangtan Institute of Technology
- Zhejiang Automobile Vocational and Technical College
- Hunan Geely Automobile Vocations and Technical College

== Technologies ==
=== Vehicle platforms ===
Many of Geely's subsidiaries produce vehicles using shared architectures.

- SPA – Scalable Product Architecture platform (2014–present)
- SEA – Sustainable Experience Architecture (2021–present)
- GEA – Global Intelligent New Energy Architecture platform (2024–present)
- CMA – Compact Modular Architecture (2017–present)
  - SMA – Scalable Modular Architecture (2025–present)
- BMA – B-segment Modular Architecture (2018–present)

=== G-ASD (Qianli Haohan) ===
Launched by Geely in 2025, "Qianli Haohan" is a unified intelligent driving solution developed by Qianli Technology, that will be equipped in all future car models developed by Geely. Depending on the levels, it offers varying levels of automated navigation and automated parking capabilities. It was renamed to G-ASD (Geely Afari Smart Driving, Qianli Haohan) in 2026.

- NOA (Navigation on Autopilot): Automated driving assistance on highways or urban roads based on navigation routes.
- D2D (Door to Door): End-to-end automated driving from the starting point to the final destination.
- APA (Automated Parking Assist): System that automatically steers the vehicle into a parking space, with the driver typically controlling acceleration and braking.
- HPA (Home-zone Parking Assist): Automated parking function that memorizes and replicates a frequently used parking route, often for a home or office garage.
- VPD (Virtual Parking Driver): A system that can automatically navigate and park the vehicle in complex parking scenarios, often using more advanced sensors and planning.

=== Semiconductor ===
SiEngine StarEagle SE1000 on EX5. SiEngine mass production of 7nm with 2048 TOPS. AD1000 (high end) and AD800 (entry level).

== Sales ==
=== Figures ===
Geely domestic sales in China, 2003–2020
Calendar year	Sales	Growth	Market share
2003	73,779	N/A	▲3.44%
2004	98,283	▲33.21%	▲3.99%
2005	143,279	▲45.78%	▲4.45%
2006	205,346	▲43.32%	▲4.89%
2007	219,512	▲6.90%	▼4.16%
2008	221,786	▲1.04%	▼4.08%
2009	329,018	▲48.35%	▼3.98%
2010	414,465	▲25.97%	▼3.70%
2011	432,752	▲4.41%	▼3.52%
2012	491,445	▲13.56%	▲3.72%
2013	549,393	▲11.79%	▼3.37%
2014	425,773	▼ -22.50%	▼2.31%
2015	532,384	▲25.04%	▲2.64%
2016	778,896	▲46.30%	▲3.30%
2017	1,251,656	▲60.70%	▲5.16%
2018	1,382,119	▲10.42%	▲5.96%
2019	1,255,480	▼ -9.16%	▼5.93%
2020	1,134,433	▼ -9.50%	▼5.77%

Geely Group sales
Year	Total	Geely Automobile Holdings							Qianli	Volvo	Polestar	Proton	Farizon	Lotus	Smart	Ji Yue	Zhidou
Year	Total	Geely	Geely Galaxy	Geely Geometry	Zeekr	Lynk & Co	Radar	LEVC	Livan/Maple	Volvo	Polestar	Proton	Farizon	Lotus	Smart	Ji Yue	Zhidou
2010	425,194	425,194	-	-	-	-	-	-	discontinued	-	-	-	-	-	-	-	-
2011	857,006	452,161	-	-	-	-	-	-	discontinued	404,735	-	-	-	-	-	-	-
2012	905,083	527,918	-	-	-	-	-	-	discontinued	377,165	-	-	-	-	-	-	-
2013	979,691	617,484	-	-	-	-	-	-	discontinued	362,207	-	-	-	-	-	-	-
2014	878,818	499,165	-	-	-	-	-	-	discontinued	379,653	-	-	-	-	-	-	-
2015	1,025,287	578,517	-	-	-	-	-	-	discontinued	421,374	-	-		-	-	-	25,395
2016	1,333,077	809,079	-	-	-	-	-	-	discontinued	503,706	-	-	1,961	-	-	-	20,292
2017	1,938,057	1,273,837	-	-	-	6,012	-	-	discontinued	536,905	-	70,991	6,228	1,600	-	-	42,484
2018	2,276,846	1,401,819	-	-	-	120,414	-	1,293	discontinued	666,586	-	64,744	5,024	1,630	-	-	15,336
2019	2,194,145	1,245,168	-	12,662	-	128,066	-	2,507	discontinued	694,831	-	100,183	7,313	1,320	-	-	2,095
2020	2,150,134	1,166,920	-	10,300	-	175,456	-	1,118	2,620	667,159	9,853	109,716	5,265	1,378	-	-	349
2021	2,189,409	1,046,186	-	55,320	6,007	220,516	-	392	4,945	698,693	21,940	114,708	18,980	1,710	-	-	12
2022	2,312,613	975,391	-	149,389	71,941	180,127	undisclosed	2,508	56,140	615,121	51,500	141,432	59,211	641	4,794	-	discontinued
2023	2,790,000	1,034,737	83,497	191,346	118,685	220,250	undisclosed	undisclosed	38,001	708,716	54,600	154,611	84,312	6,970	67,024	774	discontinued
2024	3,336,534	1,174,563	494,440		222,123	285,441	undisclosed	undisclosed	59,094	763,389	44,851	152,352	undisclosed	12,134	49,669	13,281	discontinued
2025	4,116,321	1,214,132	1,235,807		224,133	350,495	undisclosed	undisclosed	106,270	710,042	60,000	162,601	162,019				discontinued

== Other activities ==
In 2015, the manufacturer announced that it would invest $45.5 million over three years in the Icelandic company Carbon Recycling International to "collaborate on the deployment of renewable methanol fuel production technologies and vehicles running 100% on methanol in China, Iceland, and other countries".

== See also ==
- Automobile manufacturers and brands of China
- List of automobile manufacturers of China
- List of foreign brand vehicles developed and manufactured by automobile companies of China
- Automotive industry in China
- List of automotive manufacturers by production
