= Electric vehicle industry in China =

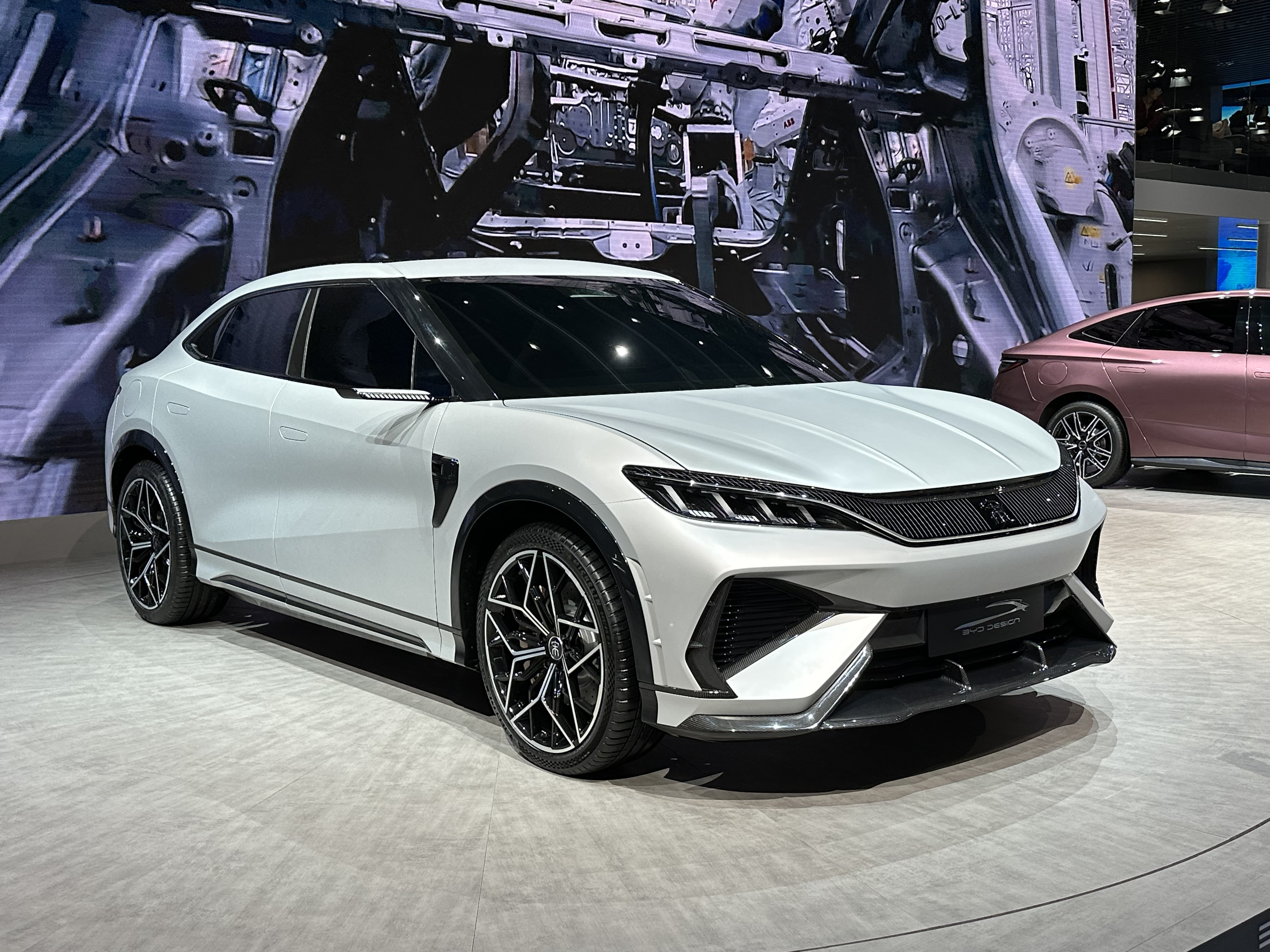
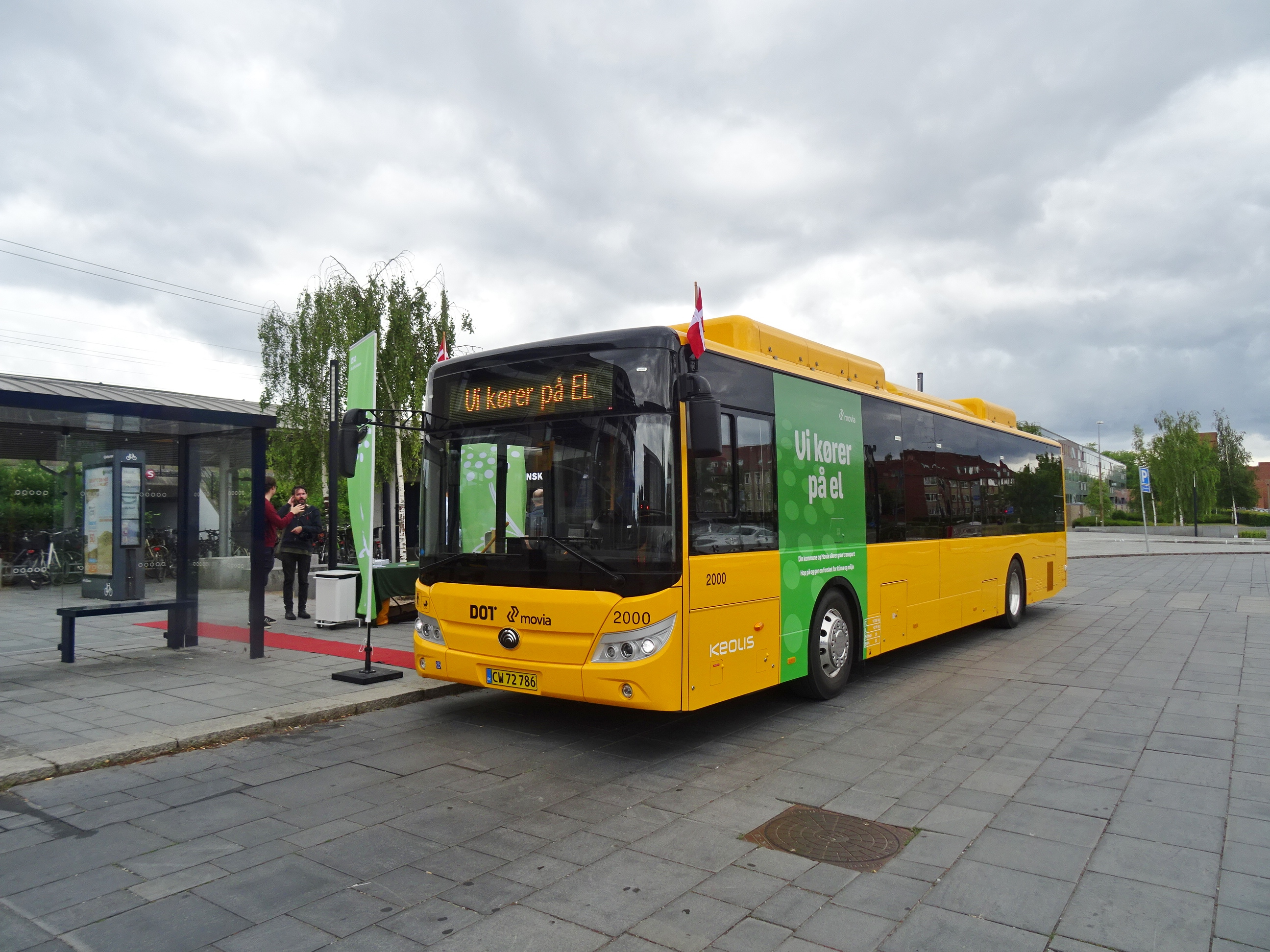
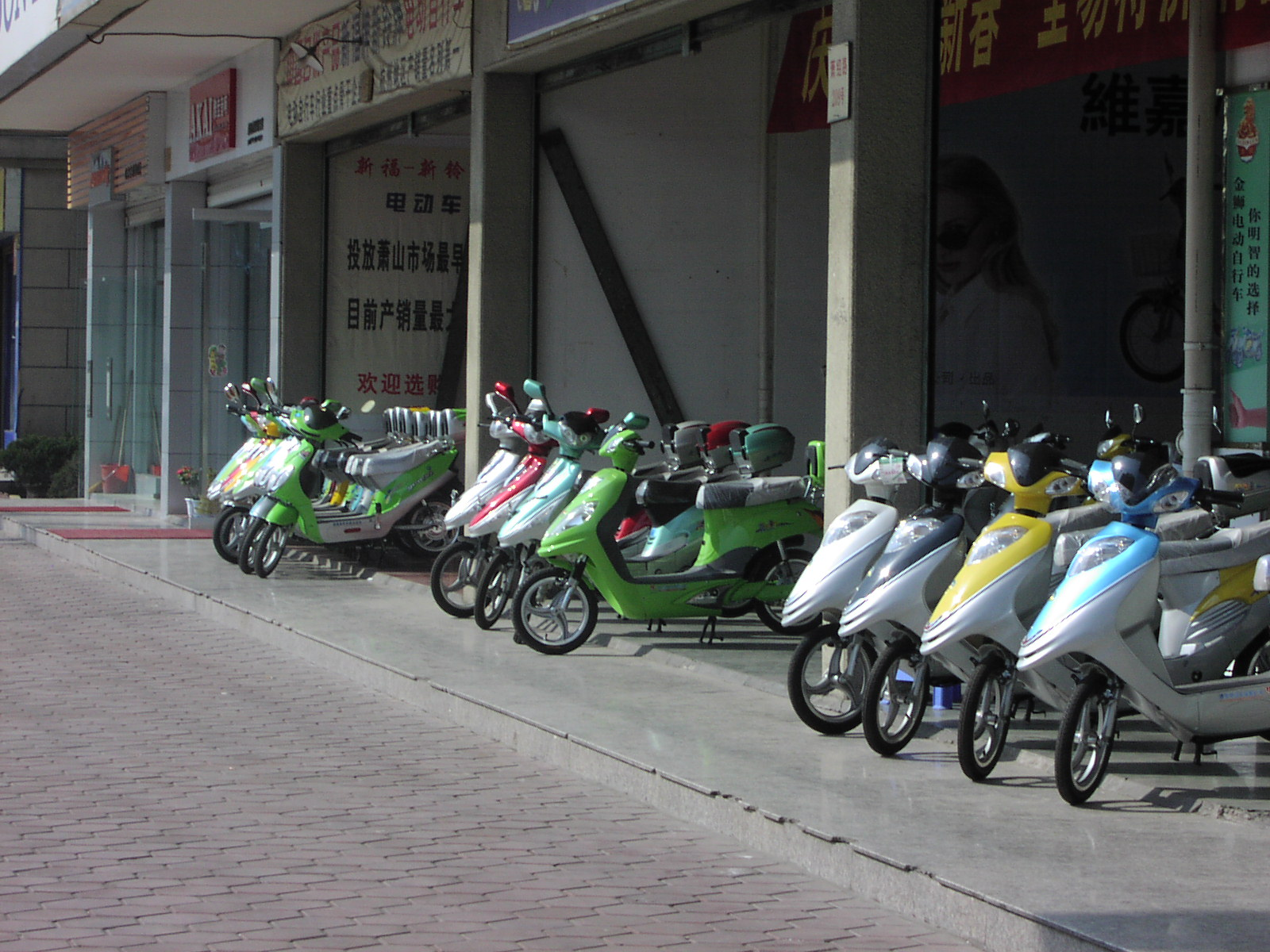
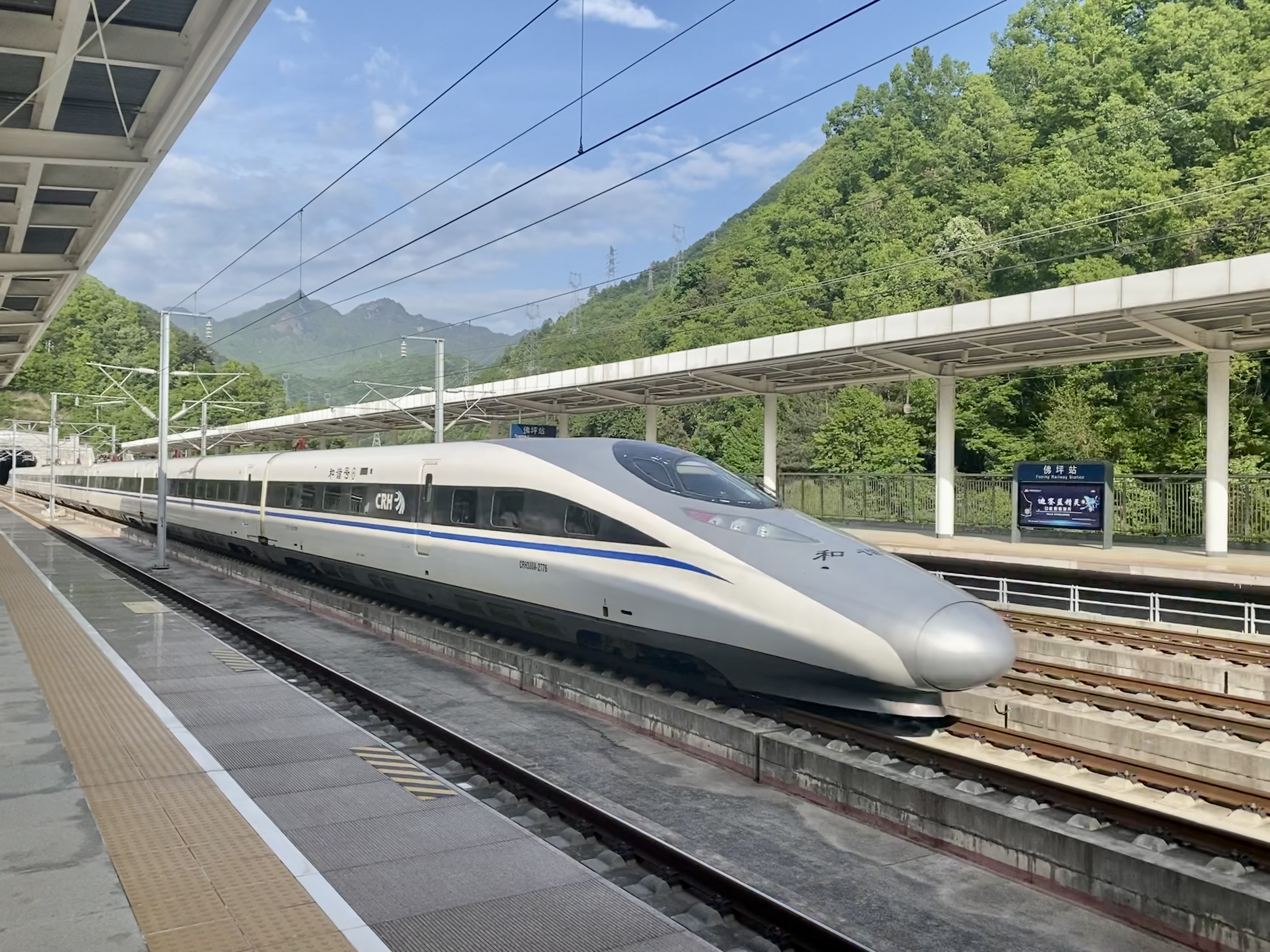
Electric vehicles produced in China (left to right, from top):
- BYD Song, BYD is the world's largest producer of electric vehicles.
- Yutong electric bus.
- Electric scooters and electric bikes are a common form of transportation in China.
- Electric high speed train.

China has the largest electric vehicle industry in the world, accounting for more than 70% of global production of electric vehicles (EVs) and 67% of global sales in 2024 and more than 2.62 million exports in 2025. In 2025, CAAM reported China had sold 16.49 million passenger electric vehicles, In 2024, 60% of EV sales were battery electric vehicles (BEVs) and 40% were plug-in hybrid electric vehicles (PHEVs). China also dominates the electric bus and light commercial vehicle market, reaching over 500,000 buses (95% of global stock) and recording new sales of 447,000 commercial EVs in 2023. In 2025, 51% of sales of vehicles in the automobile market in China were electric vehicles.

Plug-in electric vehicle (BEV and PHEV) sales were 47.9% of the overall automotive sales in China in 2024. This is a significant increase from 2020, when plug-in electric vehicles accounted for only 6.3% of total sales. The plug-in market in China was dominated by Chinese companies, with BYD Auto and SAIC Motor occupying the top two spots, and 5 out of the top 7 spots.

The electric battery industry is closely related to the EV industry as EV batteries constitute around 1/3 of the cost of EVs and around 80% of lithium-ion batteries in the world are used in EVs. The industry also has significant Chinese presence, with major players including world's largest CATL, BYD FinDreams, CALB, Gotion, SVOLT and EVE Energy.

== History ==
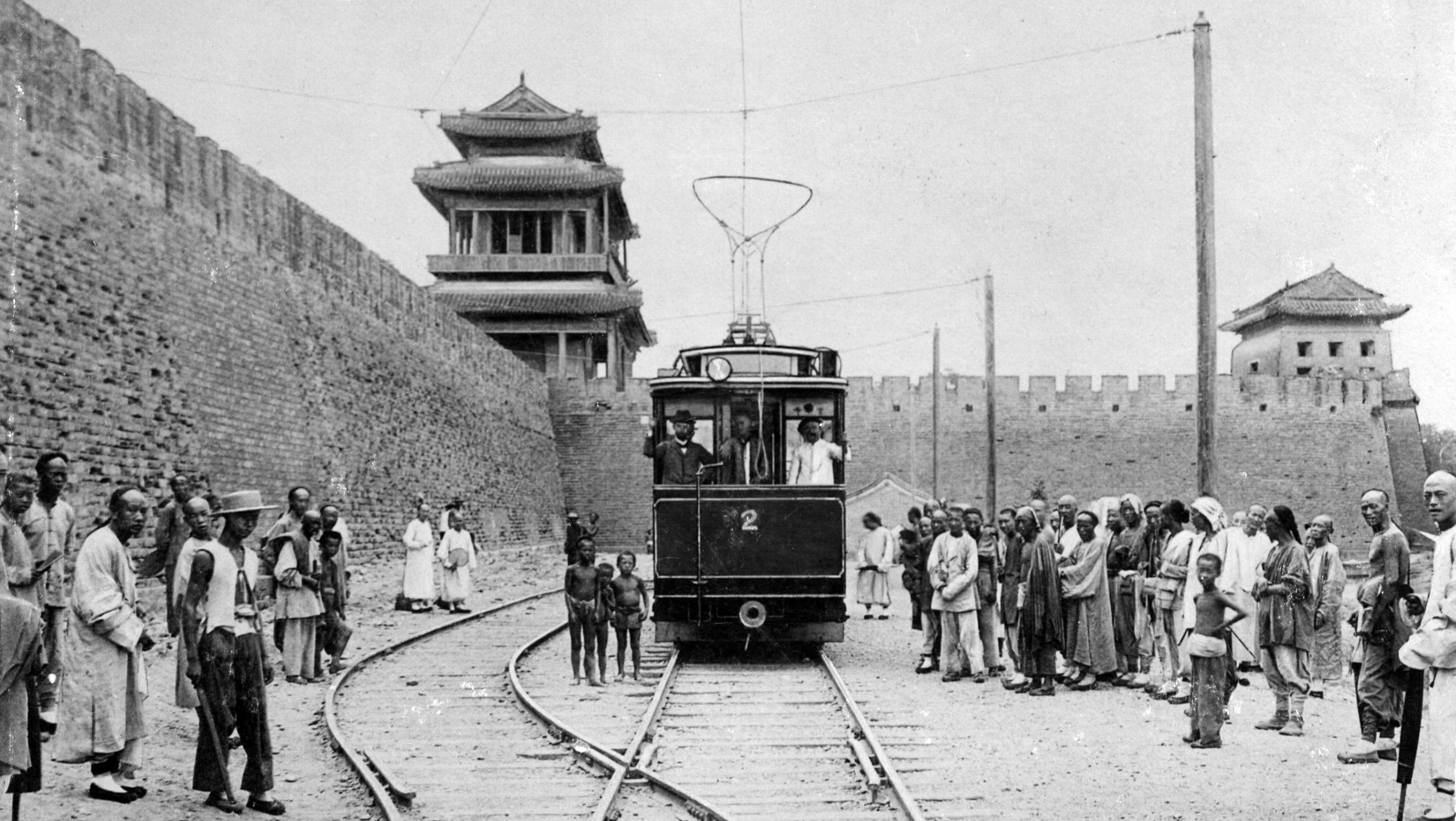
An early electric tramway car in China

Just as electric transportation was an early form of transportation in many parts of the world, China also would have transportation that would be powered electrically, such as electric trams. China would later invest in subways throughout the country and China's first subway was constructed in Beijing in January 1970, nearly one hundred years after its initial development in London.

By 1984, 66 major subway systems existed worldwide. Urban rail transit helped ease the immense pressure caused by urban traffic congestion, while allowing commuters to travel at great speed and convenience. Tianjin was the second city to have an urban rapid transit system and Shanghai was the third, the latter opening its Metro in 1995 that incorporated both subway and light railway lines.

== Electric vehicle manufacturers ==
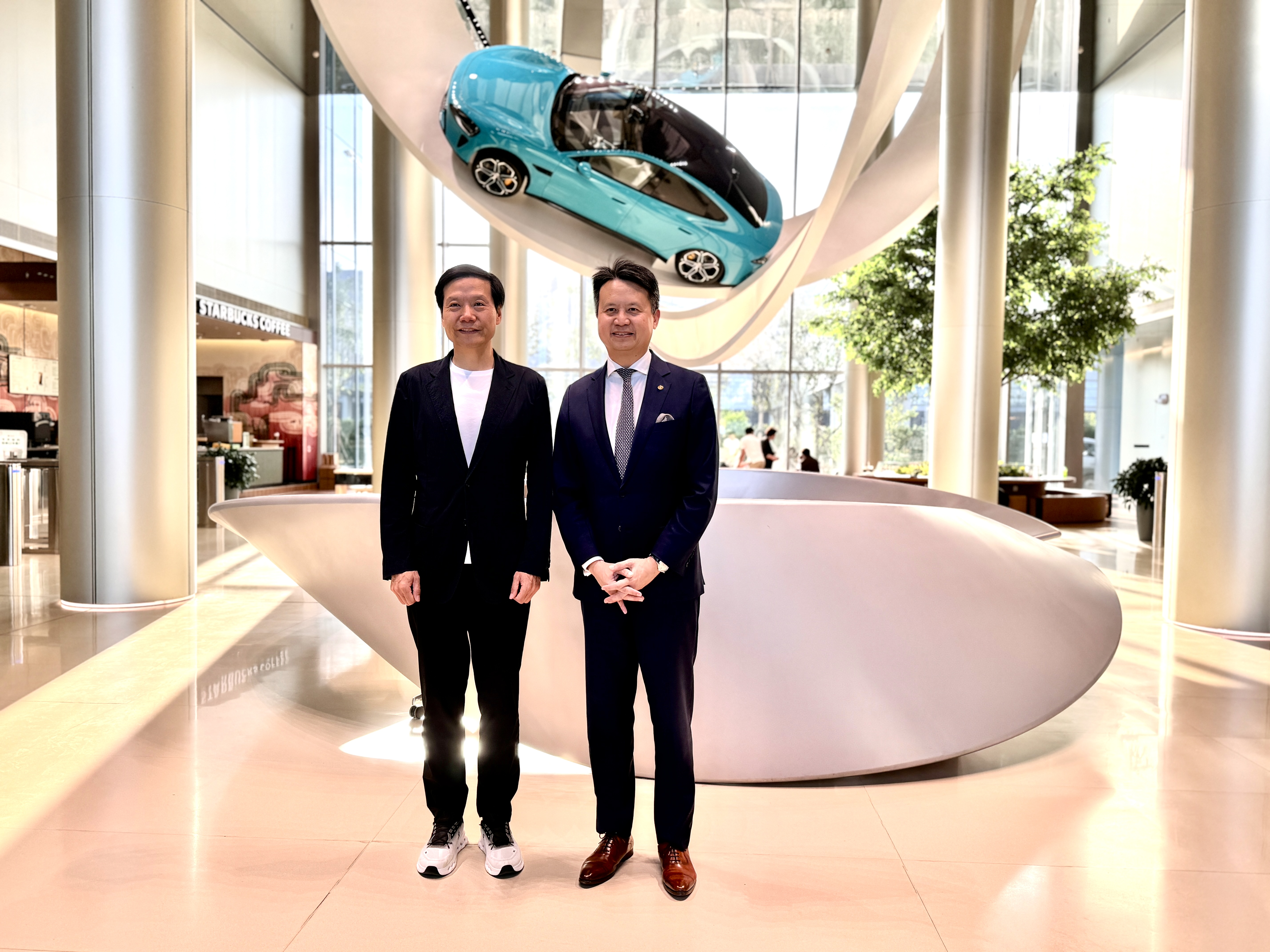
WIPO Director General Daren Tang (right) and Xiaomi Founder and CEO Lei Jun (left) at Xiaomi's electric vehicle factory in Beijing

Plug-in electric vehicle (BEV and PHEV) sales was 15% of the overall automotive sales in China in 2021. NEV adoption rapidly increased to a record 28% in March 2022, and according to BYD chairman Wang Chuanfu could reach 35% by end of 2022, exceeding the government goal of 20% by 2025. The plug-in market in China was dominated by Chinese companies, with BYD Auto and SAIC Motor occupying the top two spots, and 5 out of the top 7 spots.

It is difficult to estimate the comparative size of EV companies in China as foreign companies such as Tesla and VW have significant sales and manufacturing in China, while Chinese companies such as BYD have significant overseas sales. Some Chinese companies also have foreign-based subsidiaries such as Geely, which owns Polestar and Lynk & Co.

According to Bloomberg, there were 500 Chinese electric car manufacturers in China in 2019. After fierce competition, only 100 manufacturers remained by 2023. According to Wired, as many as 300 manufacturers, both domestic and international, were offering electric vehicles in China in 2023.

=== Foreign companies ===
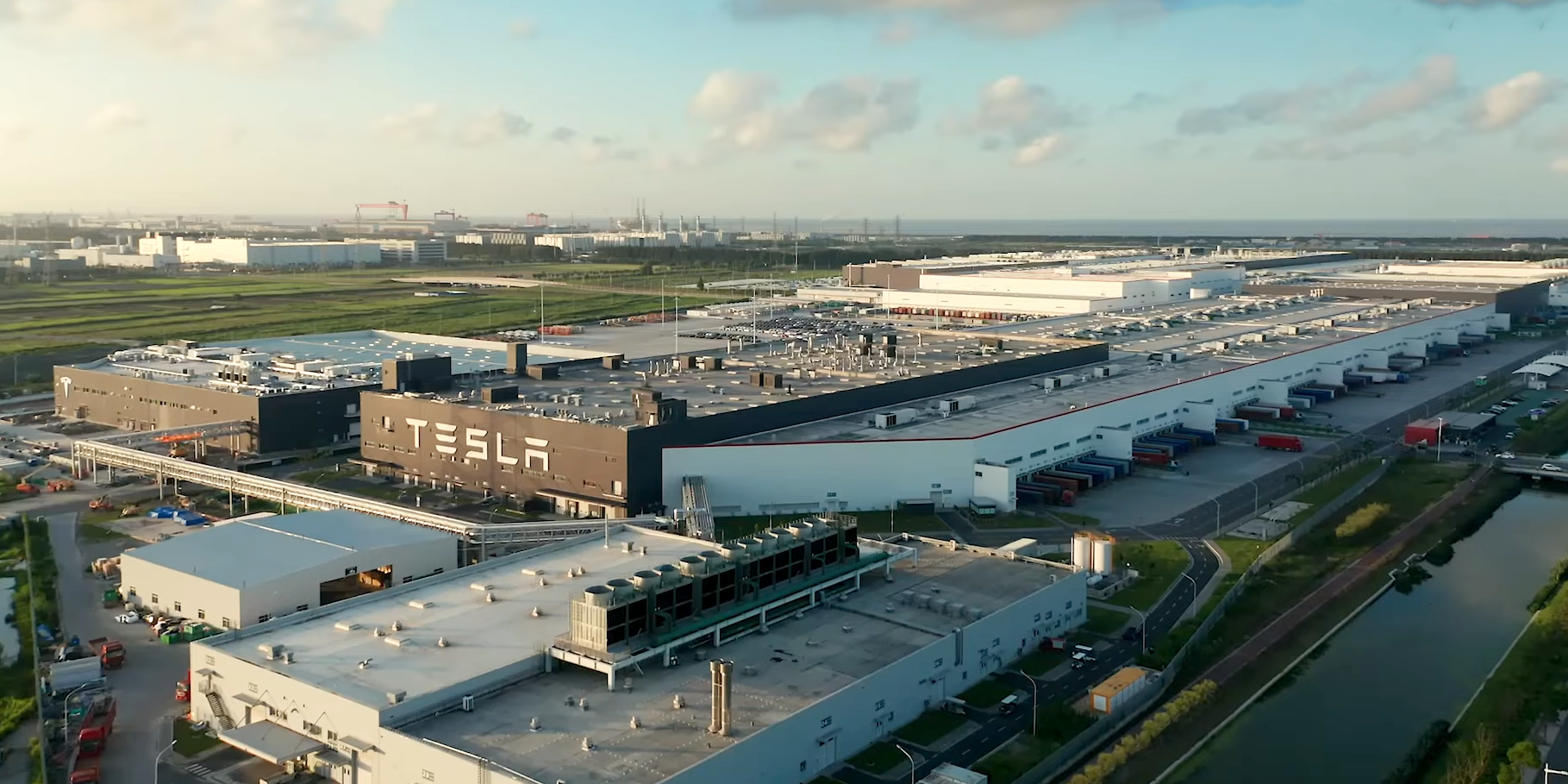
Tesla Gigafactory in Shanghai

Tesla opened its first "Gigafactory" outside the United States in Shanghai, China, in 2019. Giga Shanghai was the first automobile factory in China fully owned by a foreign company, and was built in less than 6 months, becoming Tesla's main export hub. In November 2021, total production was 56,965 vehicles and capacity was estimated to be nearing 700,000 vehicles per year, becoming the largest of the Tesla factories. There is an expansion planned to increase capacity to up to 1.1 million in 2022, and possibly 2 million in the future, becoming the company's largest plant by far.

Volkswagen manufactures electric vehicles in China through joint ventures such as Volkswagen Anhui (formerly JAC-VW), SAIC-VW (Anting), FAW-VW (Foshan), producing vehicles based on the Volkswagen MEB platform. Capacity is expected to reach a total of 1 million by 2023, around 20% of Volkswagen's total automotive production in China.

On 26 July 2023, the Volkswagen Group announced its investment of $700 million in XPeng for purchasing 4.99% stake of the company. The VW Group will collaborate with XPeng to develop two VW brand electric models for the mid-size segment in the Chinese market in 2026. In February 2024, XPeng and Volkswagen Group signed a technology cooperation and joint development agreement on platform and software.

On 26 October 2023, Stellantis acquired "approximately 20%" of Chinese electric vehicle manufacturer Leapmotor in a transaction worth €1.5 billion. Under the terms of the agreement, Stellantis gained exclusive rights to sell, export, and manufacture Leapmotor products outside of China under the newly established joint venture Leapmotor International, of which Stellantis holds 51% of the capital.

=== Domestic companies ===
As of at least 2024, the Chinese EV industry is in a strong competitive position in the developing world market, including southeast Asia. Many southeast Asian countries have made policy changes in an effort to attract investment from Chinese automakers.

==== BYD Auto ====
BYD Auto Co., Ltd. is the automotive subsidiary of the Chinese multinational BYD Co Ltd, headquartered in Xi'an, Shaanxi Province. It was founded in January 2003, following BYD Company's acquisition of Qinchuan Automobile Company in 2002. The company produces cars, buses, trucks, electric bicycles, forklifts and rechargeable batteries. The current model range of automobiles includes electric vehicles, plug-in hybrid vehicles and petrol engine vehicles.

It is the fourth largest plug-in electric vehicle (BEV and PHEV) company and fourth largest BEV company in the world, with 9.1% and 7% global market share respectively in 2021. The company is undertaking rapid expansion, with sales hitting over 100,000 per month in March 2022, and is expecting to sell between 1.5 million to 2 million plug-in EVs in 2022, around 3 to 4 times the volume in 2021, possibly overtaking current world leader Tesla.

The company also has a battery division, which is the world's fourth largest producer of EV batteries with a market share of 14.4% as of January 2024.

==== SAIC Motor ====
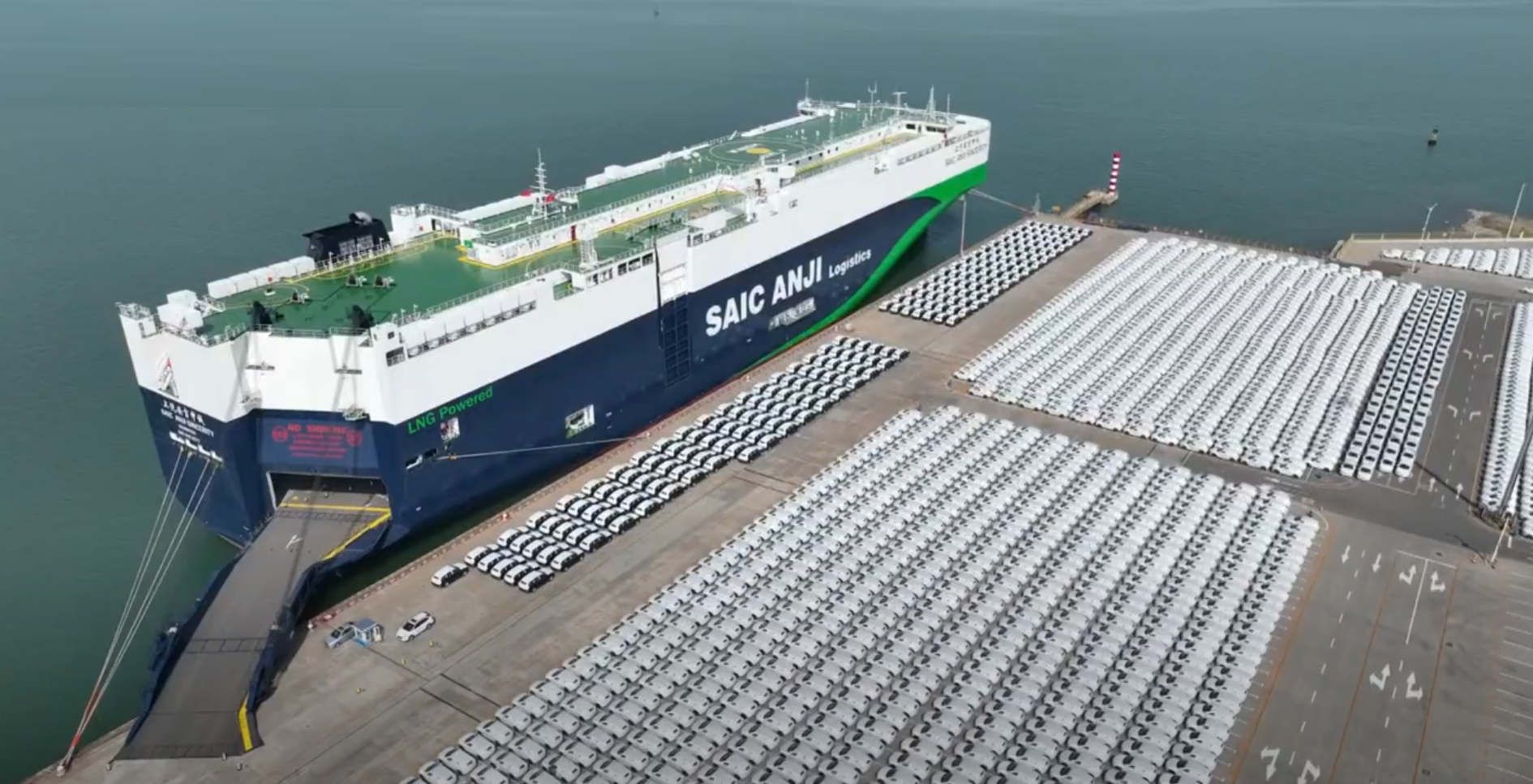
Anji, a transport ship for vehicles made by SAIC

SAIC Motor Corp., Ltd. (formerly Shanghai Automotive Industry Corporation) is a Chinese state-owned automobile manufacturer headquartered in Anting, Shanghai. Founded in 1955, it is currently the largest of the "Big Four" state-owned Chinese car manufacturers, ahead of FAW, Dongfeng and Changan, with car sales of 5.37 million, 3.50 million, 3.28 million and 2.30 million in 2021 respectively.

The company produces and sells vehicles under its own branding, such as Maxus, MG, Roewe, Baojun (under SGMW), Wuling (under SGMW), Feifan, as well as under foreign-branded joint ventures such as SAIC-Volkswagen and SAIC-General Motors. In 2021, domestic-branded cars took 52% of sales. It also produces electric vehicles under some of the previously listed brandings, including dedicated EV brands such as Feifan.

It is currently a Fortune Global 100 company, ranked 60 on the list. Including SGMW, it is also the third largest plug-in electric vehicle (BEV and PHEV) company and second largest BEV company in the world, with 10.5% and 13% global market share respectively in 2021, selling under brand names such as Wuling, Baojun, Maxus, MG, Roewe and Feifan.

==== Great Wall Motor ====
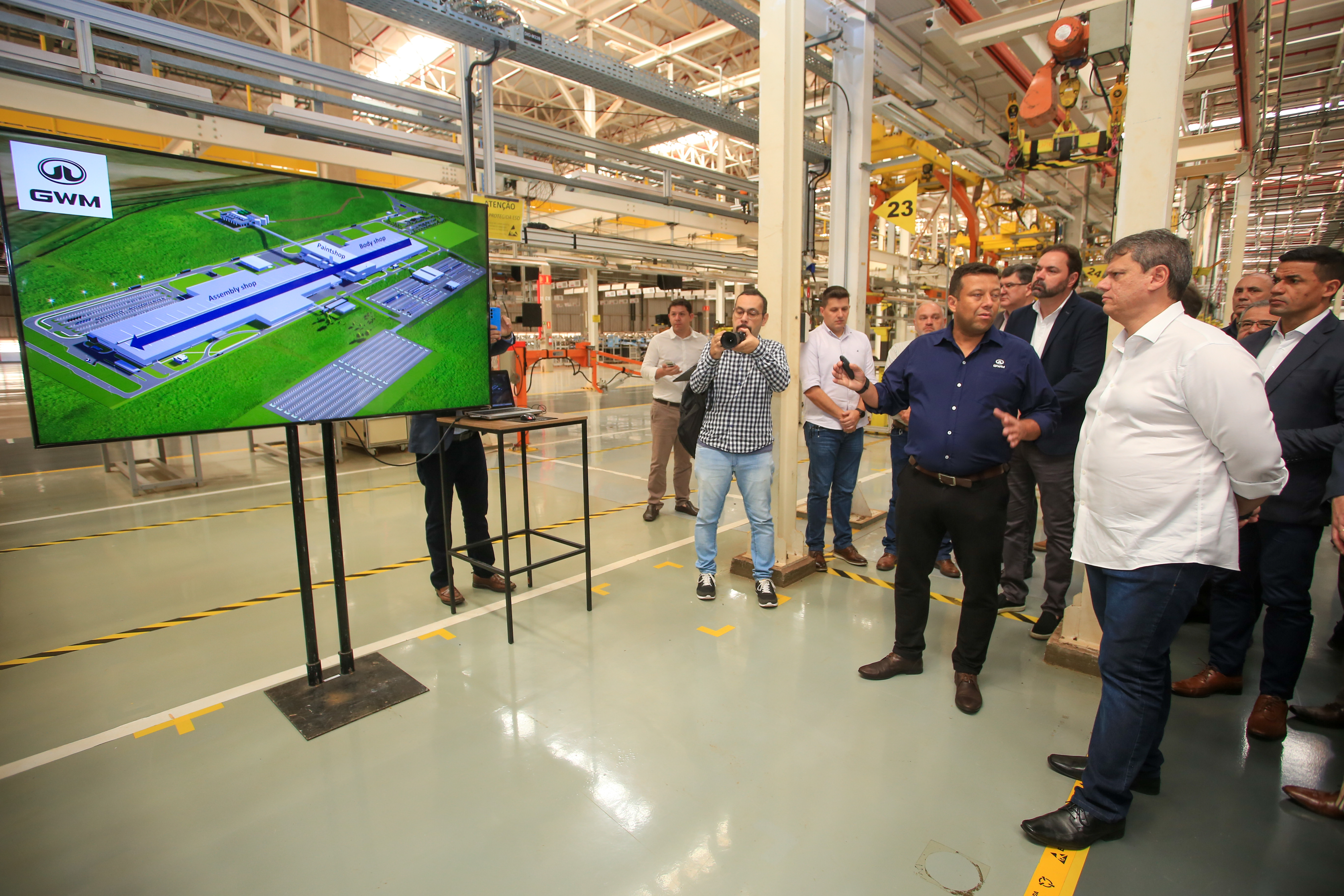
Exports and new factories are a part of the expansion of the manufacturer.

Great Wall Motor Co., Ltd. (GWM) is a Chinese privately owned automobile manufacturer headquartered in Baoding, Hebei. Founded in 1984, it is currently the eighth largest automobile manufacturer in China, with 1.281 million sales in 2021.

The company produces and sells vehicles under its own branding, such as GWM, Haval, WEY, TANK, POER, ORA. It also produces electric vehicles under some of the previously listed brandings, including dedicated EV brands such as ORA.

Named after the Great Wall of China, the company is China's largest producer of sport-utility vehicles (SUVs) and pick-up trucks. In 2021, it was the third largest Chinese plug-in electric vehicle manufacturer in the Chinese market, with 4% of market share, selling under brand names such as Ora and Haval.

==== GAC Group ====
Guangzhou Automobile Group Corp., Ltd. (GAC Group) is a Chinese state-owned automobile manufacturer headquartered in Guangzhou, Guangdong. Founded in 1954, it is currently the fifth largest automobile manufacturer in China, with 2.144 million sales in 2021.

The company produces and sells vehicles under its own branding, such as Trumpchi, Aion, Hycan as well as under foreign-branded joint ventures such as GAC-Toyota, GAC-Honda, GAC-FCA (Jeep) and GAC-Mitsubishi. It also produces electric vehicles under some of the previously listed brandings, including dedicated EV brands such as Aion and Hycan.

In 2021, it was the fourth largest Chinese plug-in electric vehicle manufacturer in the Chinese market, with 4% of market share. It sold over 20,000 units of EVs in March 2022.

==== Geely ====
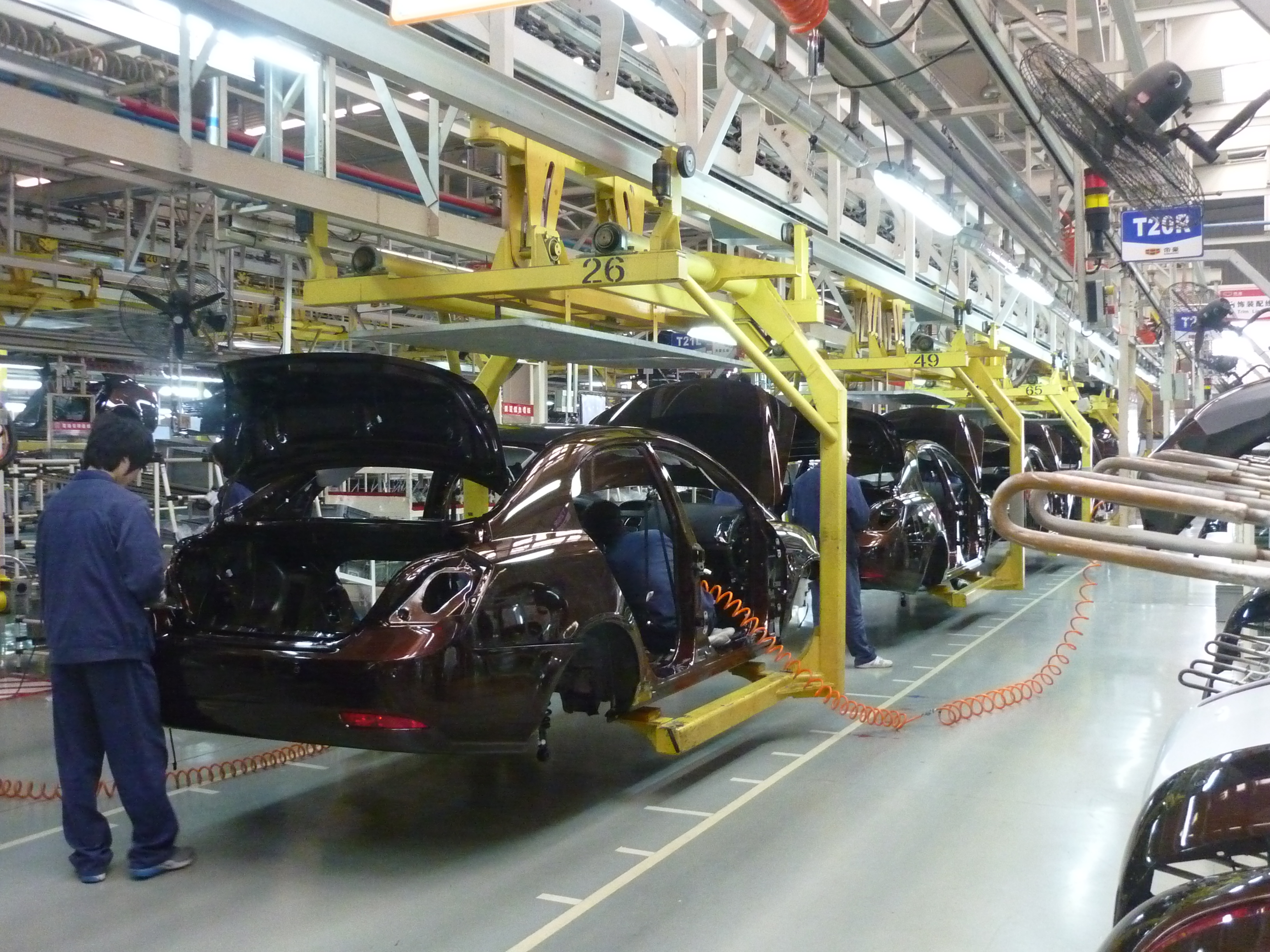
Geely assembly line in Beilun, Ningbo

Zhejiang Geely Holding Group Co., Ltd (ZGH), commonly known as Geely, is a Chinese multinational automotive company headquartered in Hangzhou, Zhejiang. The company is privately held by Chinese billionaire business magnate Li Shufu. It was established in 1986 and entered the automotive industry in 1997 with its Geely Auto subsidiary. Geely Auto is currently the seventh largest automobile manufacturer in China, with 1.328 million sales in 2021.

The company produces and sells vehicles under its own branding, such as Geely Auto, Geometry, Maple, Zeekr, under foreign-located subsidiaries, such as Volvo Cars, Polestar, Lynk & Co, Proton, Lotus as well as commercial only vehicles under the London EV Company, Ouling Auto and Yuan Cheng Auto (Farizon Auto) brands. It also produces electric vehicles under some of the previously listed brandings, including dedicated EV brands such as Geometry, Maple, Zeekr and Polestar.

The group sold over 2.2 million cars in 2021. The company sold over 17,926 plug-in electric vehicles in January 2022.

==== Other companies ====
- Aiways
- Chery
- Changan Automobile
- Nio
- XPeng
- Li Auto
- Neta (Hozon Auto)
- Leapmotor
- AITO
- Xiaomi Auto
- Wuling
- Zeekr

Chinese major EV venture brands sales
Year	Nio	Xpeng	Neta	Leapmotor	Li	Seres
2018	11,348	482	1,206	-	-	-
2019	20,565	16,608	11,212	1,000	1,000	-
2020	43,728	27,041	15,509	10,266	33,457	-
2021	91,429	98,155	69,674	43,121	90,491	-
2022	122,486	120,757	152,073	111,168	133,246	76,180
2023	160,038	141,601	127,496	144,155	376,030	106,703

=== Longest ranges ===
In 2024, Chinese EVs and ranges (average 500 km (310 mi) and 100 kWh, trend to 1,000 km (620 mi) in the lead position):

- 9. Weltmeister W6: 562 km (349 mi) on a single charge with its 88.5 kWh battery pack.
- 8. Hozon Neta S: 571 km (355 mi) with 77.4 kWh.
- 7. Zeekr 001: 579 km (360 mi) powered by 100 kWh.
- 6. Tesla Model S: 602 km (374 mi).
- 5. XPeng P7: 608 km (378 mi), 96.7 kWh.
- 4. Arcfox Alpha S: 649 km (403 mi), 95 kWh.
- 3. GAC Aion LX Plus: 676 km (420 mi), 144.4 kWh.
- 2. BYD Han EV: 684 km (425 mi), 100 kWh.
- 1. NIO ET7: 1,044 km (649 mi), 150 kWh semi-solid state battery pack.

== Battery manufacturers ==
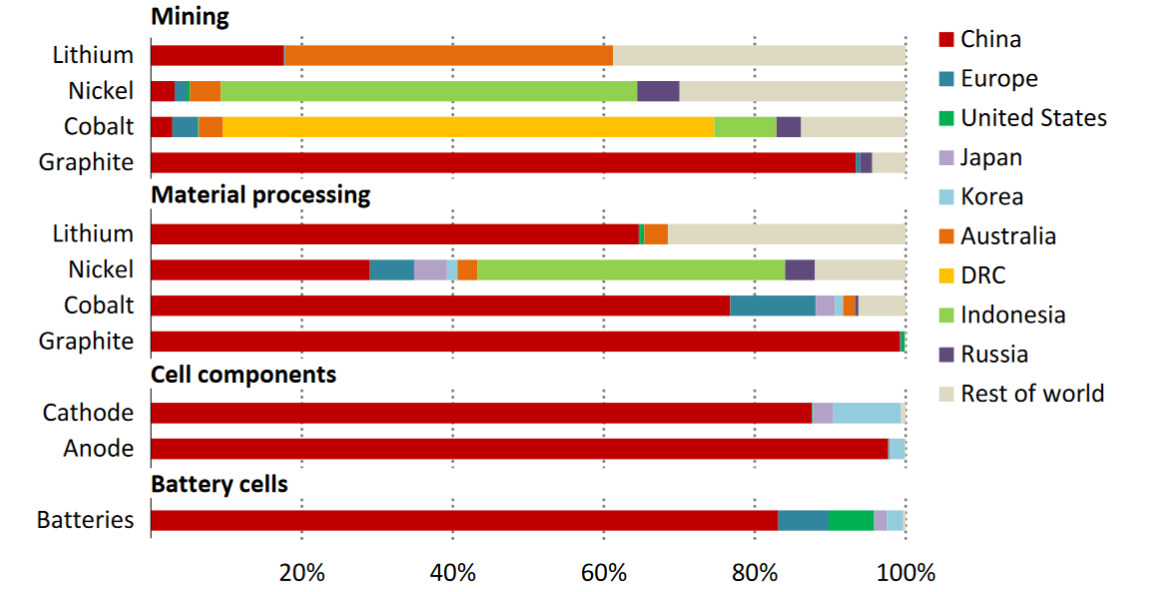
Geographical distribution of the global battery supply chain, 2024

The battery industry is closely related to the EV industry as batteries constitute around 1/3 of the cost of EVs and around 80% of lithium-ion batteries in the world are used in EVs. It is estimated to be worth around $30 billion 2021 and expected to grow to around $127 billion by 2027, with demand expected to reach 3000 Gwh by 2030. Globally, manufacturing capacity is expected to increase to more than 5,500 GWh by 2030, including 3,000 GWh of capacity announced by Chinese manufacturers to date.

As of 2021, total demand of the market was 296.8 GWh, over double of the amount in 2020. As of Q1 2021, LFP type battery market share reached 24.1%, with Chinese manufacturers holding a near monopoly, and is expected to rise further to surpass NCM type batteries in 2028.

=== Domestic companies ===
==== CATL ====
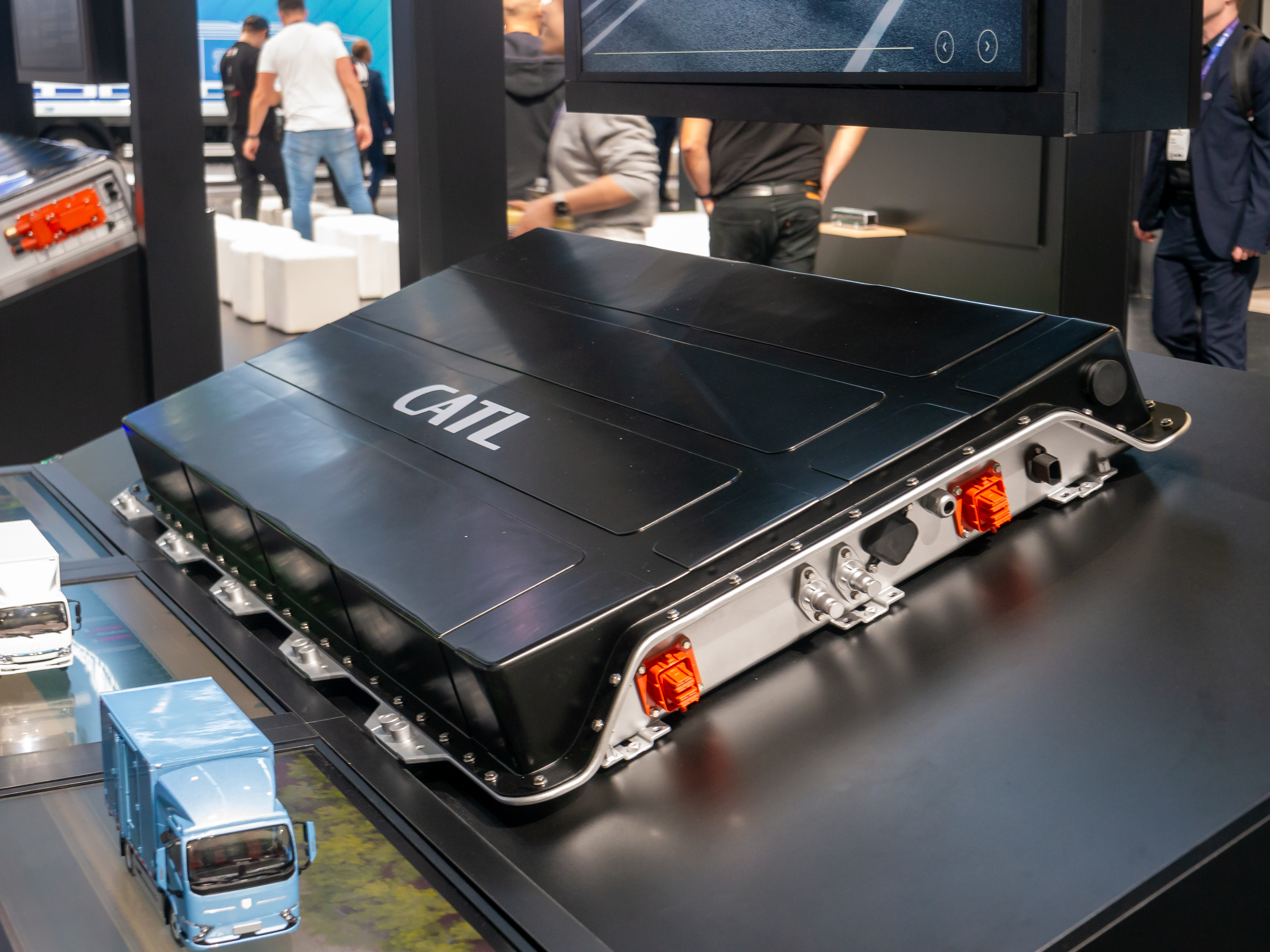
CATL batteries power many electric vehicles in China and internationally.

Contemporary Amperex Technology Co, (CATL) is a Chinese battery manufacturer and technology company founded in 2011 that specializes in the manufacturing of lithium-ion batteries for electric vehicles and energy storage systems, as well as battery management systems (BMS). With a market share of 32.6% in 2021, CATL is the biggest lithium-ion battery manufacturer for EVs in the world, producing 96.7 GWh of the global 296.8 GWh, up 167.5% year on year. The company has a manufacturing capacity target of >500 GWh by 2025 and >800 GWh by 2030.

==== Other companies ====
Companies listed include all battery manufacturers, some of which may not be involved in EV battery manufacturing.

- BYD
  - 26.3 GWh (up 167.7%) and 8.8% share. Manufacturing capacity target of 670 Gwh by 2025
- CALB
  - 7.9 GWh (up 130.5%) and 2.7% share. Manufacturing capacity target of 500 Gwh by 2025 and 1000 Gwh by 2030.
- Gotion
  - 6.4 GWh (up 161.3%) and 2.1% share. Manufacturing capacity target of 300 Gwh by 2025. Around 26% owned by Volkswagen.
- SVOLT
  - 3.1 GWh (up 430.8%) and 1.0% share. Manufacturing capacity target of 600 Gwh by 2025. Spun off from battery unit of Great Wall Motor.
- EVE Energy
  - Manufacturing capacity target of 200 Gwh by 2025.
- Sunwoda
  - Manufacturing capacity target of >100 Gwh by 2025.
- REPT Battero
  - Manufacturing capacity target of 200 Gwh by 2025.
- Farasis Energy
  - Manufacturing capacity target of >100 Gwh by 2025. Backed by Mercedes-Benz.

==== Battery companies by EV battery market share ====
Rank	Company	Market share % (2023)
1	CATL	36.8
2	BYD	15.8
3	CALB	4.7
4	Gotion	2.4
5	EVE Energy	2.3
6	Sunwoda	1.5

=== Foreign companies ===
South Korean companies LG Energy Solution, SK On, and Samsung SDI all operated battery facilities in China as of 2025. SK On established joint ventures with Beijing Automotive Group and EVE Energy.

== Other developments ==
=== Energy storage ===
E-vehicles use only electric motors and gearboxes, and have few parts requiring maintenance. Compared to traditional vehicles and excluding the battery, they are cheaper and easier to build. However, building battery with sufficient capacity and discharge-cycles is a challenge.

BYD Company is a Chinese company that builds rechargeable batteries using a new technology that, according to the company, makes them safer than other lithium-ion models. In 2005, it became the world's leading small battery company and is one of the world's largest manufacturers of rechargeable batteries. It is emerging as a leader in the technology sector.

Tianjin Lishen Battery Joint-Stock Co. Ltd. is another China based battery manufacturer. The company has a partnership with Coda Automotive, a California based company, to develop a Coda electric vehicle and ultimately, batteries for use in electricity generation. The focus of the latter will be to provide energy storage for wind and solar energy generation.

=== Energy infrastructure ===
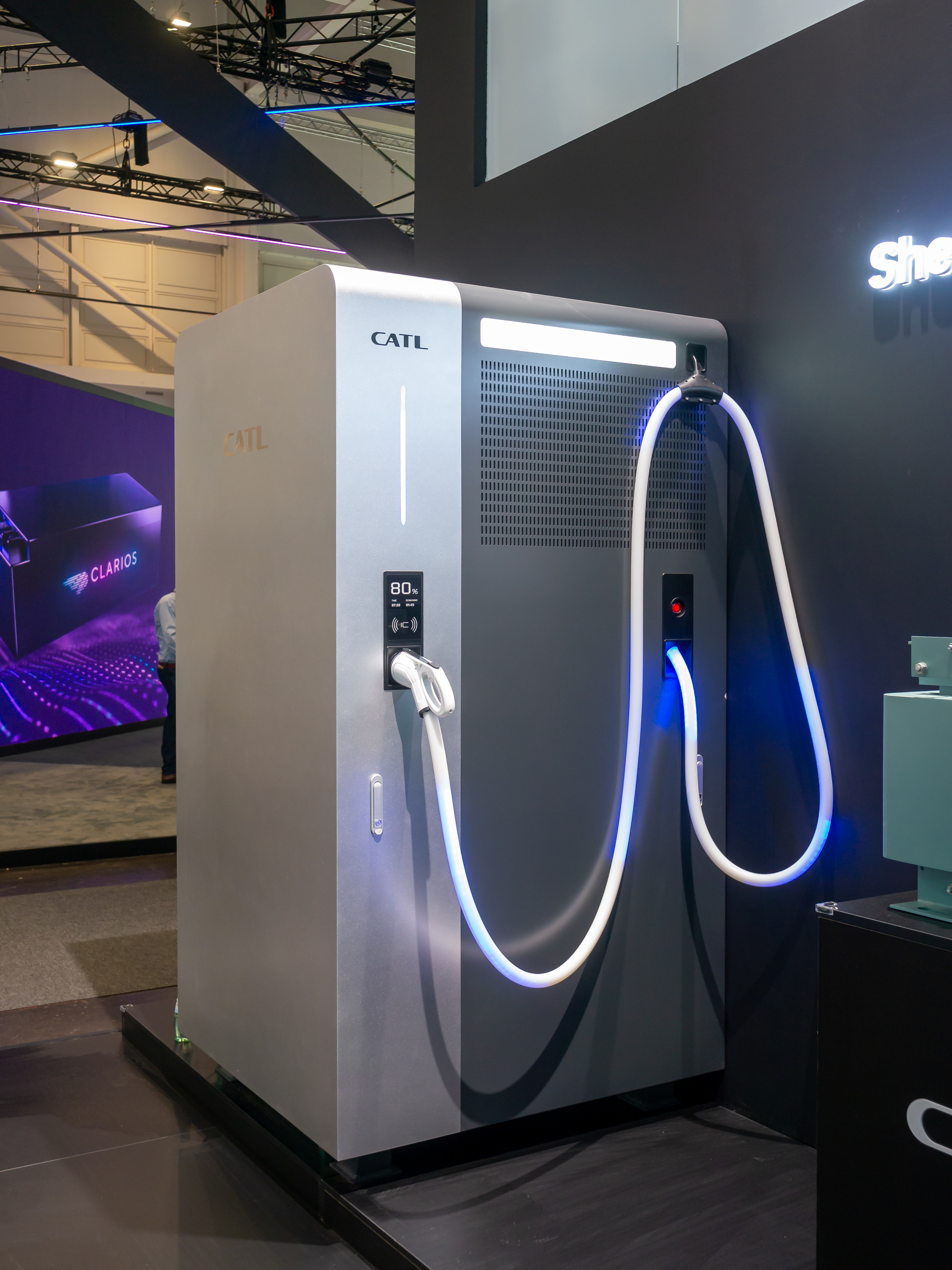
Electric vehicle charging stations are just one part of the energy infrastructure that is being built throughout the country.

While the shape of this industry is still emerging, electricity generation and the infrastructure to deliver energy appear to be the areas with the highest potential and relevancy to manage future energy use. According to consulting group Oliver Wyman, "some utilities are already engaging a specific area of the value chain, setting priorities for near-term, medium-term, and long-term initiatives. They have begun to model different market and business impact scenarios, with the goal of identifying the biggest upsides and pitfalls."

Utilities have begun to develop focused strategies in areas where they are well positioned to serve the electric-vehicle value chain. At the moment, a variety of business design ideas are competing to shape the new marketplace. China has invested a great deal into this fundamental component of the value chain, and some of the principal facilitators are as follows:

==== State Grid Corporation of China ====
The State Grid Corporation of China (SGCC), commonly known as the State Grid, is a Chinese state-owned electric utility corporation. It is the largest utility company in the world. As of March 2024, State Grid is the world's third largest company overall by revenue, behind Walmart and Amazon, and is also the largest government-owned company by revenue. In 2023 it was reported as having 1.3 million employees, 1.1 billion customers and revenue equivalent to US$546 billion.

==== Jiangxi Ganneng. Co ====
An electricity provider, year-end 2009, the company finished approximately six billion kilowatt-hours of on-grid electricity, and had an attributable installed capacity of 1.5 million kilowatts, including 1.4 million kilowatts of thermal power and 100,000 kilowatts of hydropower.

==== NARI Technology ====
NARI Technology develops, manufactures and sells software and hardware products serving the power industry, and also provide system integration services. It also provides software and hardware services and system integration services for things such as power grid dispatching automation products, electricity market commercial operating systems, and electrical control automation products.

==== XJ Electric Co. ====
This company is primarily engaged in research, development, manufacture and distribution of automation, protection and controlling products for electric power systems. Specifically, it provides power grid and power generation equipment, transformers, electrical systems, electric power distribution network products, electrified railway products and direct current (DC) power distribution systems.

=== Encouraging policy ===
China has promoted the development of the electric vehicle (EV) industry through a series of encouraging policy measures to reduce petroleum fuel consumption and greenhouse gas emissions. Still, the market for electric cars is small. Against this backdrop, the Chinese government began phasing out EV subsidies in 2018 with the goal of eliminating them by 2022. (In 2017, the government battery subsidies fell by 30%.) In recent years, the Chinese government has introduced a series of incentive policy measures to promote the development of the electric vehicle industry, such as consumer subsidies, various tax exemptions, toll-free, charging infrastructure construction, research and development grants, etc. (R & D) electric vehicle manufacturers. In February 2024, China approved a joint venture between subsidiaries of BMW and Mercedes-Benz. They would work on building a rapid charging network in the country.

=== Export ===
In 2024 the European Union raised tariffs on EVs imported from China following an anti-subsidy probe, prompting China to lodge a complaint with the World Trade Organization.

In 2024, the United States and Canada imposed a 100% tariff on all EVs imported from China. In 2026, Canada reduced the tariff to 6.1% for up to 49,000 vehicles.

== Controversy ==
=== Sales registration inflation ===
In China, the practice of selling "zero-mileage used cars"—brand new vehicles registered and resold as second-hand—emerged as a strategy for automakers to inflate sales data and reduce inventory.

According to a July 2025 investigative report by Reuters and the China Securities Journal, electric vehicle brands Zeekr, owned by Geely, and Neta, owned by Zhejiang Hozon New Energy Automobile, inflated their sales figures by exploiting China's vehicle insurance registration system. Both companies arranged for cars to be insured before being delivered to buyers, enabling them to report these units as sold under Chinese industry standards, which define a sale based on insurance registration.

== See also ==
- Economy of China
- Electric Vehicle Company
- New energy vehicles in China
- List of electric vehicle battery manufacturers
- List of battery electric vehicles
- Electric vehicle conversion
- Electrification
- Hybrid electric vehicle
- Motorized bicycle
- Climate change in China
- Pollution in China
- Renewable energy in China
- Sustainable business
- Sustainable transport
- China Shock 2.0
