= Exergonix, Inc. =

- Industry: Energy Storage
- Headquarters: Lee’s Summit, MO, US
- Key people: Don Nissanka — CEO
- Website: exergonix.com

Exergonix Inc is an energy storage company based in Kansas City, Missouri. It was founded in 2010, after spinning out of Kokam America, Inc., which was acquired by Dow Chemical Company in 2009. Exergonix develops grid energy storage to supply peak-shaving, demand management, and smart grid capabilities to the grid and microgrid.

The company designs and builds renewable energy services for a wide range of applications, including storage for solar and wind power, utility management, the military, telecommunications cell towers, and emergency backup.

== Background ==
=== History ===
According to the company president’s statement to the United States Senate Committee on Commerce, Science, and Transportation in 2012, the company’s mission is to make renewable energy cost-effective and will allow nations around the world to implement a worldwide, workable, smart, and decentralized utility grid.

The facility sits atop 83 acres of land on Missouri Route 291 and U.S. Route 50, previously owned by Pfizer, Inc. Valued at $90 million, the company raised another $2 million from a local angel investor group, and a $1.4 million package from the City of Lee’s Summit, Missouri. Also, from Senators Kit Bond and Jim Talent, the company further secured $8 million in federal funding from a defense spending bill to bring a new manufacturing plant to Missouri. In 2011, the "Green Energy Park" was dialed back to $50 million, after $100 million in federal money fell through. The CEO had approached state legislators to seek $650 million for a manufacturing plant in the same area.

=== Funding ===
The CEO approached the United States Department of Defense with new battery technology and although the agency was interested, its budget was committed. Senator Kit Bond was then approached with the request to include the money in the department's budget.

Nissanka said: "I would say that the reason we got the money has nothing to do with a high-power lobbyist, we got it because of our technology. Earmarks, unfortunately, are the only way you can drive new technology into the market." Nissanka provided testimony during Senator Roy Blunt’s attempt at Revitalize American Manufacturing and Innovation Act of 2013.

Exergonix received $2 million to build and install a 1-megawatt utility storage at Whiteman Air Force Base in Knob Noster, Missouri, in order to demonstrate the ability of the US military to provide safe and effective energy security compounded with renewable energy. The battery technology offered an improved cycle life, lighter weight, wider operating temperature range, and true maintenance-free design. Applications include many aerospace and defense uses, such as weapon platforms, aircraft, and future land warrior programs.

== Energy storage projects ==
In 2010, as part of Emanuel Cleaver’s Green Impact Zone in Kansas City, Exergonix, along with Siemens, Electric Power Research Institute, Landis+Gyr, Intergraph, Tendril, City of Kansas City, and the Mid-America Regional Council, launched a pilot project for SmartGrid development under the Office of Electricity Delivery and Energy Reliability with funding from the American Recovery and Reinvestment Act of 2009 in partnership with Kansas City Power and Light. The project aimed to generate greater energy efficiency, reduce costs, improve reliability, provide more transparent and interactive information, and improve the environmental footprint.

President Barack Obama expressed bright futures talking to Smith Electric Vehicles’s US branch about clean technology jobs, where Kokam America was the battery supplier, and CEO Don Nissanka (also formerly Kokam America President and CEO) was on the board. Besides Smith Electric, Nissanka had customers in the EV market, but he declined to disclose any of their names. He was also on the 18-member Automotive Jobs Task Force, appointed by Governor Jay Nixon in 2009.

"The future is here for us in terms of the battery technology," said Nissanka.

Nissanka also initiated the “Missouri Innovation Campus” (MIC), which was Obama’s travel stop for a speech at University of Central Missouri.

“I think the president is right on; I think the administration has done a good job of putting enough money into this economy right now. We’re in a depression, and we needed this money to fuel the economy and fuel the jobs. I see it happening. It's happening around the country.”

According to InformationWeek, the company, along with a handful of other battery storage firms, shares Tesla’s ambition of disruptive home power consumption.

In May 2016, the company acquired Coda Energy.

== See also ==
- Enphase Energy
