= Radar RD6 =

Battery electric mid-size pickup truck

Radar Horizon
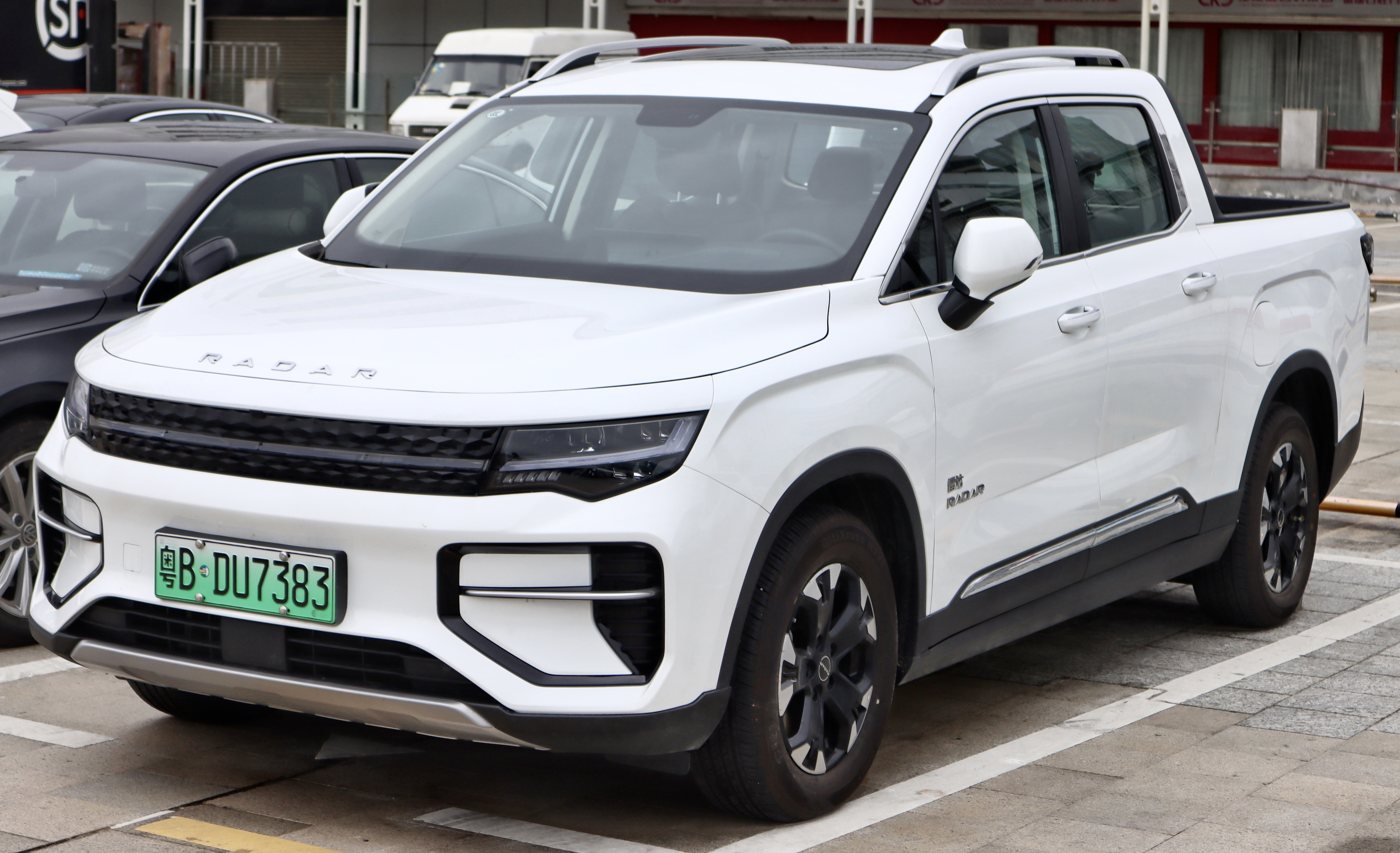

Overview
- Manufacturer: Geely Radar
- Model code: KO11
- Also called: Radar RD6; Riddara R6; Riddara RD6; Riddara Econ; Radar King Kong (RD5); Geely Radar RD6
- Production: November 2022 – present
- Assembly: China: Zibo, Shandong (Tangjun Ou Ling)
- Designer: Peter Horbury

Body and chassis
- Class: Mid-size pickup truck
- Body style: 4-door pickup truck
- Layout: Rear-motor, rear-wheel-drive; Dual-motor, all-wheel-drive; Front-engine, dual-motor, four-wheel-drive (EM-P)
- Platform: SEA Multiplex Attached Platform (MAP)
- Related: Geely Haoyue; Geely Jiaji; Livan 9

Powertrain
- Engine: 1.5-liter GEP3 turbocharged I3
- Electric motor: Single- and dual-permanent magnet synchronous motors
- Power output: 149–200 kW (203–272 PS; 200–268 hp) (RWD); 260 kW (354 PS; 349 hp) (EM-P); 280–315 kW (381–428 PS; 375–422 hp) (4WD)
- Transmission: 3-speed DHT (EM-P)
- Hybrid drivetrain: Geely's NordThor EM-P super hybrid (EM-P)
- Battery: EV: 66 kWh nickel-cobalt-manganese; 60, 63 and 73.9 kWh (Gotion LFP); 83, 86 and 100 kWh (VREMT NMC); PHEV: 19.09 kWh LFP
- Electric range: Maximum 600 km (370 mi) (CLTC); Maximum 461 km (286 mi) (NEDC)
- Plug-in charging: 11 kW AC, 120 kW DC; V2L: 6.6 kW

Dimensions
- Wheelbase: 3,120–3,310 mm (122.8–130.3 in)
- Length: 5,260–5,500 mm (207.1–216.5 in)
- Width: 1,900 mm (74.8 in)
- Height: 1,830–1,865 mm (72.0–73.4 in)
- Curb weight: 1,590–1,660 kg (3,510–3,660 lb)

Chronology
- Predecessor: Farizon FX

The Radar Horizon (Chinese: 雷达地平线; pinyin: Léidá Dìpíngxiàn) or originally, the Radar RD6 is a battery electric mid-size pickup truck produced by the Chinese automaker Geely under the Radar brand. It is built on the Sustainable Experience Architecture (SEA). The interior shares many parts with the Geely Haoyue SUV. Radar Auto has its own R&D facility in Hangzhou and an EV plant in Zibo, Shandong.

== Overview ==
The public debut of the RD6 was scheduled for the 2022 Chengdu Motor Show starting on 26 August 2022. The launch on the Chinese car market for the RD6 was on 9 September. The first version to be launched is the rear-wheel drive model with 268 hp (200 kW; 272 PS), good for a 0–100 km/h (0–62 mph) acceleration under six seconds.

The RD6 is available in single- and dual-motor configurations. Previously, it was reported that it would have a range up to 600 kilometres (370 mi) depending on the battery configuration, with power outputs ranging between 200 hp (149 kW; 203 PS) and nearly 400 hp (298 kW; 406 PS). The pure electric range could reach 373 miles (600 km) based on China's CLTC.

Payload 450 kg, 3000 kg towing, 1200 litre bed, 70 litre frunk. 6 kW output panel (220V outlets, two of each: 10A, 12A and 16A), V2L (vehicle to load) and V2V (vehicle to vehicle).

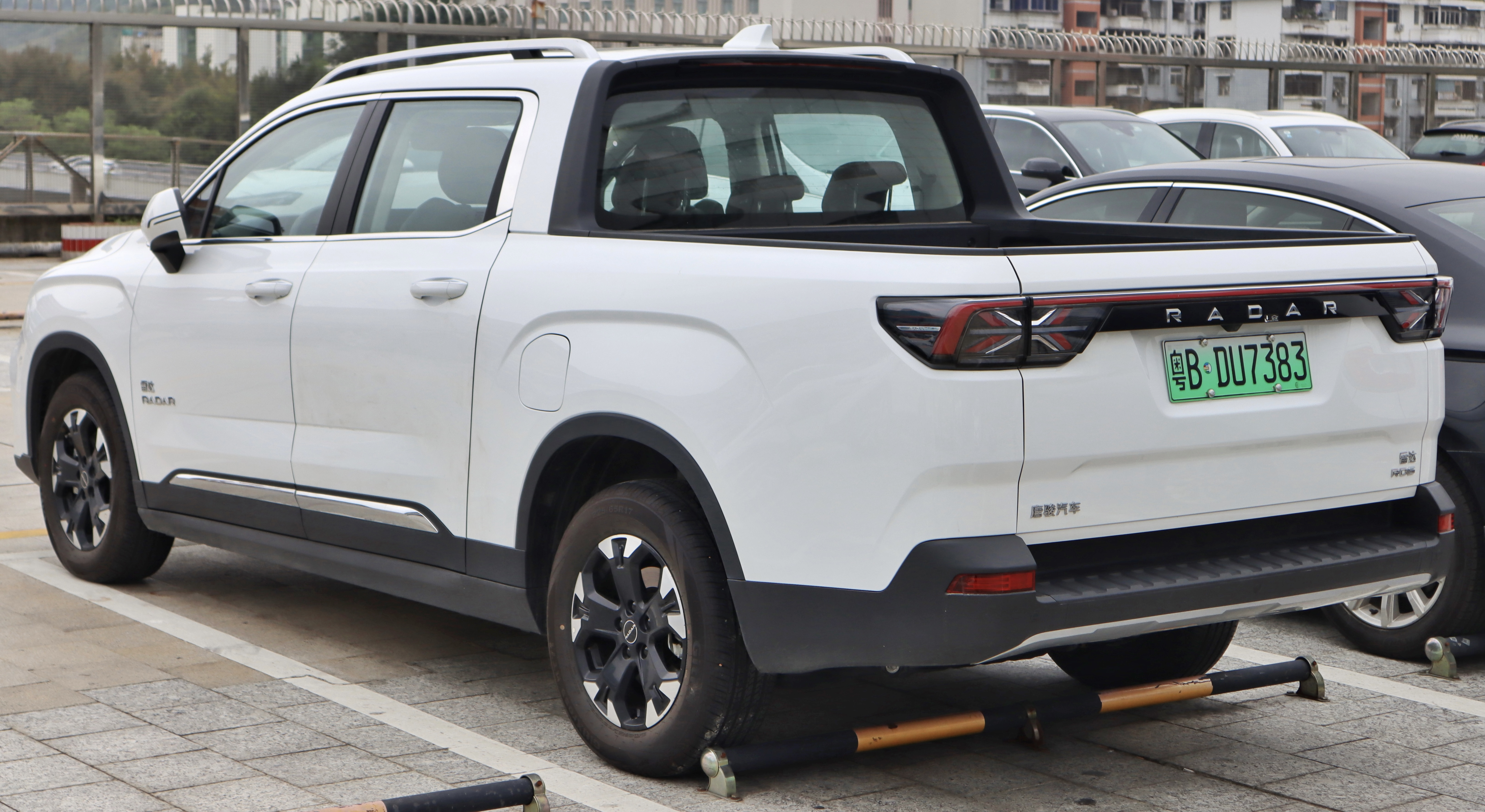
Rear view

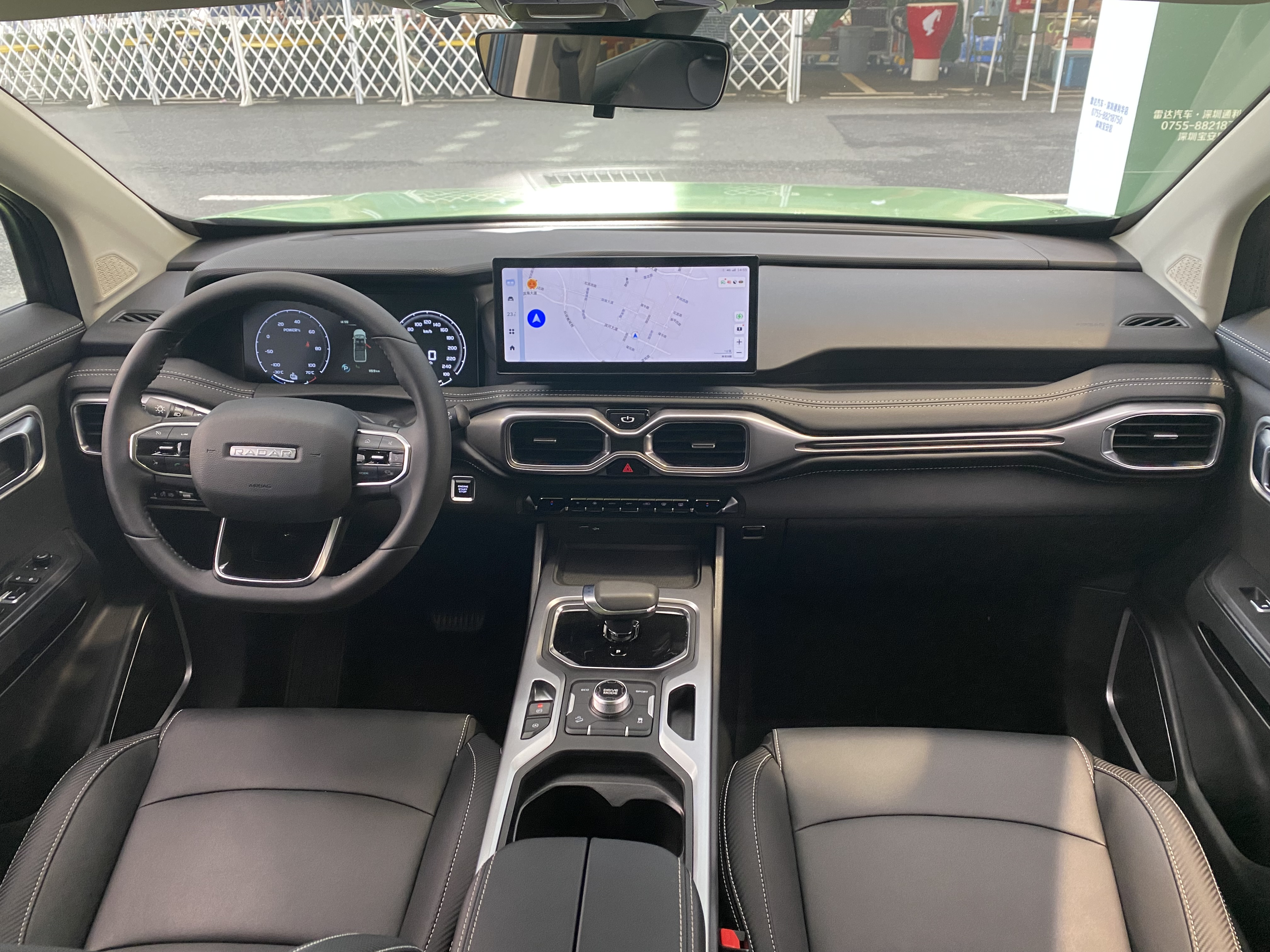
Interior

In April 2024, the Radar RD6 was relaunched as the Radar Horizon in China. The Horizon comes standard as a duo-motor 4-wheel-drive vehicle, and features slightly revised stying.

In December 2024, a cheaper variant named the Radar King Kong was introduced, with several components replaced with cheaper parts and the lower trim reintroduces single motor 2-wheel-drive options. The vehicle is marketed as the Radar King Kong while featuring RD5 labeling on the tailgate.

Radar King Kong EV

== Radar Horizon EM-P and King Kong EM-P ==
The plug-in hybrid version of the Horizon and King Kong was announced at the 2025 Shanghai Auto Show. It was launched on 28 May 2025.

The plug-in hybrids come standard with all-wheel drive. It uses Geely's Thor EM-P drivetrain. The engine is a 1.5-liter turbocharged inline 3 mated to a 3-speed dedicated hybrid transmission.

Radar King Kong EM-P

== Markets ==
=== New Zealand ===
The Riddara R6 was launched in New Zealand on 24 August 2025, in the sole variant using the 73 kWh battery pack.

=== Philippines ===
The Radar RD6 was launched in the Philippines on 5 October 2025, with six variants: Econ 63 kWh RWD, Econ 73 kWh RWD, Econ 73 kWh 4WD, EM-P Comfort, EM-P Luxury and EM-P Elite.

In October 2026, the Radar RD6 was rebranded to the Riddara RD6, aligning with other overseas markets.

=== Singapore ===
The Riddara RD6 was launched in Singapore on 30 July 2025, with 2WD and 4WD variants using the 73.9 kWh battery pack.

=== South Africa ===
The Riddara R6 was launched in South Africa on 28 August 2026, with three variants: Econ Aspire RWD, Econ Aspire AWD and Apex AWD.

=== Thailand ===
The Riddara RD6 was launched in Thailand on 29 October 2024, with four variants: 63 kWh RWD, 73 kWh RWD, 73 kWh 4WD and 86 kWh 4WD.
