= Coda Automotive =

Former American electric vehicle manufacturer

Coda Automotive Inc.
- Type: Private
- Industry: Automotive, Battery
- Founded: 2009; 17 years ago
- Defunct: May 2016; 10 years ago
- Fate: Acquired by Mullen Technologies and Exergonix, Inc.
- Headquarters: Los Angeles, California
- Key people: Philip Murtaugh (CEO), Ashoka Achuthan (CFO), Steven "Mac" Heller (Executive Chairman)
- Products: Coda Car lithium-iron batteries
- Parent: Coda Holdings (2009-2015) Exergonix, Inc. (2016-)
- Website: Coda Energy

Coda Automotive Inc. was a privately held American company headquartered in Los Angeles, California. The company designed and assembled lithium-iron phosphate (LiFePO_{4}) battery systems for automotive and power storage utility applications, and electric cars. Miles Automotive partnered with Hafei and Qingyuan Electric Vehicle to establish Coda Automotive as an affiliate company. The name CODA comes from the musical term for the concluding passage of a piece of music. Coda Automotive has said that it chose the name because its electric vehicle technology represents an end for combustion engine vehicles, and the start of the electric vehicle era.

In June 2009, Coda announced the creation and funding of LIO Energy Systems, a global joint-venture with Lishen Power Battery. LIO Energy Systems was formed with the purpose of designing, manufacturing, and selling battery systems for electric vehicles and utility applications. LIO Energy Systems will supply battery systems to Coda Automotive for use in the all-electric Coda, to other automotive OEMs globally, and to renewable energy producers, utilities and other power storage customers. LIO Energy Systems was later renamed Coda Energy.

Coda's sole vehicle offering was the Coda sedan, a four-door, five passenger electric car powered by a battery pack that delivered a United States Environmental Protection Agency (EPA)-rated range of 88 mi (142 km), the longest among its class, although considerably less than the Tesla Roadster and Tesla Model S. The electric car was released in March 2012, and initially was available only in California. After low initial sales of the Coda Car, Coda Automotive terminated 15% of its workforce, and entered a period of financial difficulty. By May 2013, Coda was seeking bankruptcy protection. In 2014, the owner of Mullen Motor Cars decided to include the bankrupt Coda Automotive in the structure of this company, thus creating a new enterprise for the production of electric vehicles called Mullen Technologies. By May 2016, Exergonix, Inc. acquired all remaining assets of the company.

== Corporate strategy and partners ==
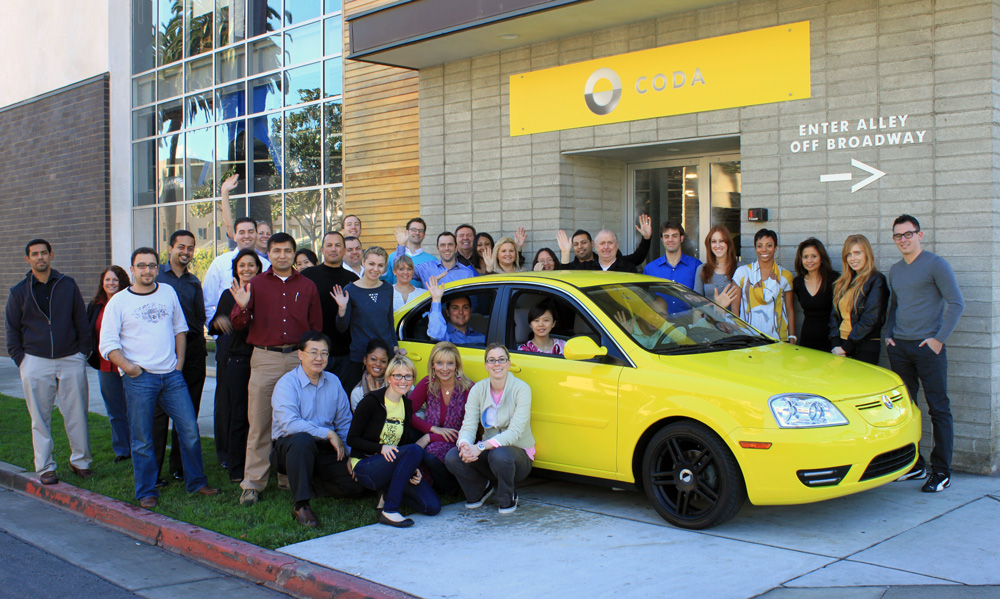
Coda employees in Santa Monica, California

Coda Automotive's goal was to accelerate the adoption of electric vehicles and renewable energy technology globally. To this end, Coda focused on improving performance and safety, reducing cost, and commercializing production of battery systems built for automotive applications, which it viewed as the "chief enabling technology" for all-electric cars. To reduce the cost of building its vehicles, Coda controlled all core design, and engineering work internally while partnering with established automotive manufacturers and suppliers to supply gliders. Coda's supply chain partners included BorgWarner, UQM Technologies, EnergyCS, Continental Automotive Systems, Porsche Design Studios, Delphi, Celgard, Novolyte Technologies, OMITEC, Lear, Hella, Hafei, and Lishen. In total, Coda had more than thirty suppliers and partners on four continents. In March 2012, Chinese car maker Great Wall Motors formed a joint venture with Coda.

== Products ==
=== Coda sedan ===
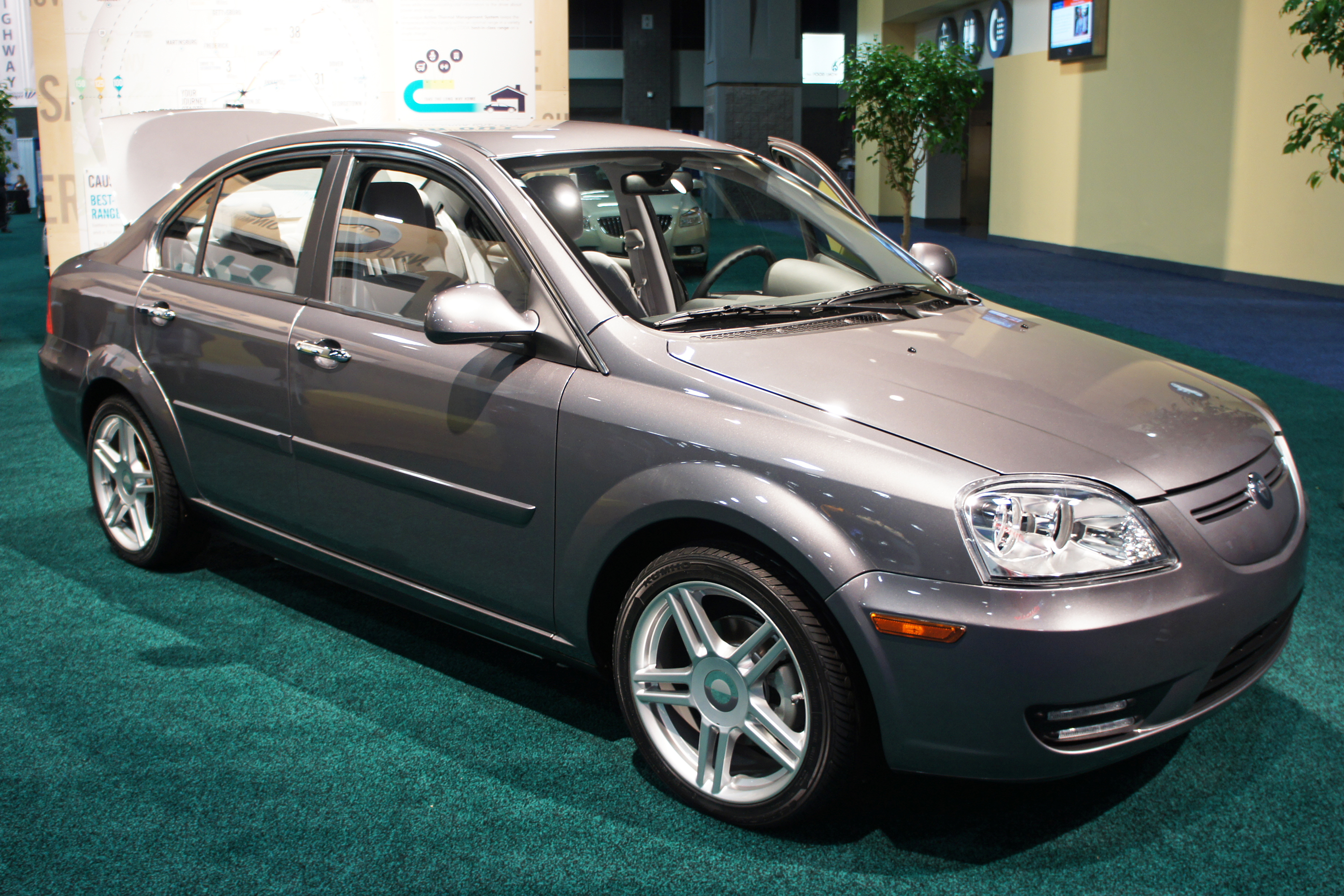
Coda electric car exhibited at the 2012 Washington Auto Show, District of Columbia

Coda's first and only car was an all-electric, four-door, five passenger battery electric vehicle (BEV), the Coda sedan. The car is powered by a 31 kWh lithium ion iron phosphate (LiFePO_{4}_{4}) battery pack that was larger than that of other vehicles in its class. According to the EPA, the Coda's range of 88 mi (142 km) was the largest among its class. The EPA rated the Coda's combined fuel economy at 73 miles per gallon gasoline equivalent (3.2 L/100 km). The car was backed by a 3-year, 36,000 mile limited warranty and the battery system was backed by a 10-year, 100,000 mile limited warranty.

Coda announced that the net price would be US$37,250 before any electric vehicle federal tax credit and other state and local incentives that were available in the U.S. Initial deliveries of the vehicle were planned for December 2010, but were pushed back to the second half of 2011. Deliveries were rescheduled again for late 2011, and then again to February 2012, with first deliveries actually taking place in March 2012. The car was sold only in California.

== Battery production and distribution joint-venture ==
Coda formed a global joint-venture with Lishen Power Battery, a global battery cell supplier to Samsung, Motorola, and Apple. The joint venture was called LIO Energy Systems, and was created to design, manufacture, and sell battery systems. The name was selected because LIO is the reverse spelling of oil. Together, Coda and Lishen developed a lithium iron phosphate battery cell for transportation and utility applications, which included renewable energy (wind and solar power) storage. LIO Energy Systems currently operates a manufacturing facility in Tianjin and plans to build a U.S. facility in Columbus, Ohio. Initially, the Coda sedan was to be the primary recipient of the battery systems produced by LIO. LIO's production capacity will total 1.4 billion amp hours in Tianjin, China at full scale. With the completion of the Ohio plant, total capacity will reach two billion Ah (6.3 million kWh) of energy storage.

In May 2010, U.S. Secretary of Commerce Gary Locke visited the LIO Energy Systems facility in Tianjin as part of the Obama administration's first cabinet-level trade mission to China. Commenting on the visit, Locke said, "International green technology partnerships can produce rapid job growth back home and deliver energy solutions abroad, and CODA's venture proves it."

== Financial history and investors ==
Kevin Czinger and Miles Rubin founded Coda in 2009. Early funding raised US$125 million. On January 6, 2011, Coda announced the first close of a US$76 million Series D investment round, bringing the company's total invested capital to more than US$200 million. LIO Energy Systems, CODA's joint venture with Lishen, was funded by a US$100 million equity investment by the partners, and as such, entered into "cooperation agreements" for "up to US$327 million of long-term credit."

Notable investors included equity firms Harbinger Capital Partners, Piper Jaffray, and Riverstone Holdings, and personal investors Henry "Hank" Paulson, John Bryson, Klaus Tschira, Les Wexner, Mack McLarty, Miles Rubin, Steven “Mac” Heller, and Tom Steyer.

=== Bankruptcy and legal issues ===
After selling approximately 100 Coda cars in California, Coda filed for Chapter 11 bankruptcy protection on May 1, 2013. Coda Holdings stated that it expected to emerge from the bankruptcy process to focus solely on its subsidiary Coda Energy, and would abandon car manufacturing, which is capital intensive.

Shortly after the bankruptcy announcement, former employee Tony Bulchak filed a class-action lawsuit against the automaker, alleging that Coda laid off 125 workers on December 14, 2012, without giving them a 60-day notice. The complaint was resolved in January 2014.

== Website Acquisitions ==
From 2014 to 2015, the Coda website was inaccessible. In 2015, the website was bought up by a used car dealer in Louisville, Kentucky, who had left in most of the original Coda website's contents, not including the homepage and a few other, minor pages. On April 19th 2025, the website was sold again and bought by a Steroid company called Grizzly Steroids as a redirect site to their main website.

== Awards ==
Lung disease advocacy group Breathe California named Coda a Clean Air Award winner in the Technology Development category on April 19, 2010.

Silicon Valley networking organization AlwaysOn selected Coda as one of the top privately held companies focused on green technology in its GoingGreen 100 List for 2010.
