= Geely Radar =

Electric Chinese vehicle manufacturer

Radar New Energy Vehicle (Zhejiang) Co., Ltd.
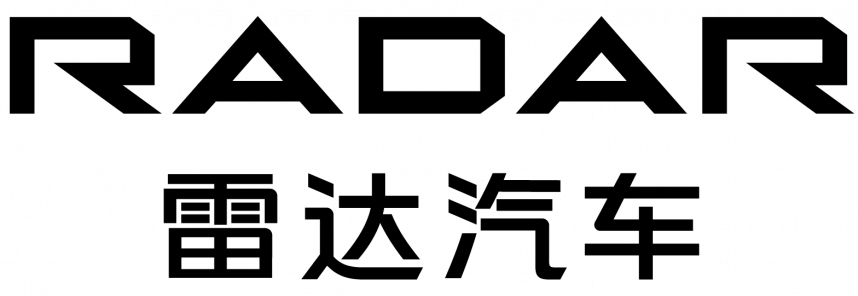
- Type: Subsidiary
- Industry: Automotive
- Founded: July 2022; 4 years ago
- Headquarters: Hangzhou, Zhejiang, China
- Area served: China
- Key people: Ling Shiquan (CEO)
- Products: Automobiles
- Parent: Geely Auto (100%)

Chinese name
- Simplified Chinese: 雷达新能源汽车（浙江）有限公司
- Hanyu Pinyin: Léidá Xīn Néngyuán Qìchē (Zhèjiāng) Yǒuxiàn Gōngsī
- Website: radar-ev.com; riddara.com (global)

Radar New Energy Vehicle (Zhejiang) Co., Ltd., commonly known as Geely Radar (Chinese: 吉利雷达; pinyin: Jílì léidá) or Geely Riddara outside China, is a subsidiary of Chinese vehicle manufacturer Geely Auto. The brand solely produces electric vehicles.

== Details ==
Radar Auto is a brand focusing on electric "lifestyle vehicles", and as of 2024 offers one model, the Radar RD6 battery electric pickup truck. In the future, Radar will launch four new cars, including an SUV, a small pickup truck, a large SUV, and an all-terrain vehicle (ATV).

The company has its own research and development (R&D) facility in Hangzhou, Zhejiang and an electric vehicle production facility in Zibo, Shandong, where it manufactures the RD6.

In overseas markets, Radar Auto was rebranded as Riddara due to trademark resistance from Singaporean tyre company Omni United, which has a brand called Radar Tires.

In November, Radar Auto has been consolidated into Geely Auto.

== Products ==
- Radar Horizon (2022–present)
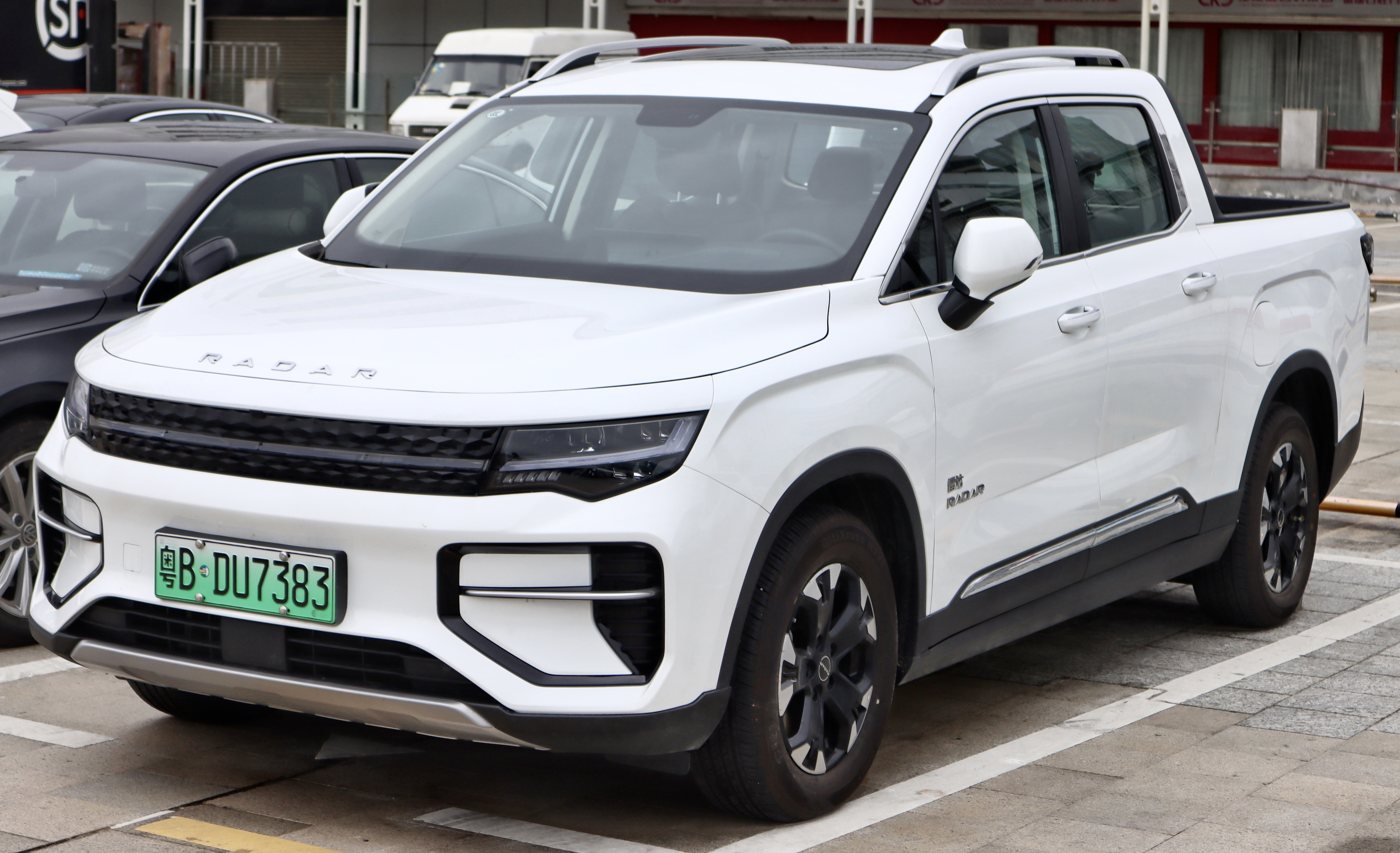
Radar Horizon

== See also ==
- Automobile manufacturers and brands of China
- List of automobile manufacturers of China
