= Revitalize American Manufacturing and Innovation Act of 2013 =

Revitalize American Manufacturing and Innovation Act of 2014
- Long title: To require the Secretary of Commerce to establish the Network for Manufacturing Innovation and for other purposes.
- Announced in: the 113th United States Congress
- Sponsored by: Rep. Tom Reed (R, NY-23)
- Number of co-sponsors: 1

Codification
- Acts affected: National Institute of Standards and Technology Act
- U.S.C. sections affected: 15 U.S.C. § 271 et seq., 15 U.S.C. § 278r, 35 U.S.C. ch. 18
- Agencies affected: Government Accountability Office, United States Congress, United States Department of Commerce
- Authorizations of appropriations: $600,000,000 over year(s)

Legislative history
- Introduced in the House as H.R. 2996 by Rep. Tom Reed (R, NY-23) on August 2, 2013; Committee consideration by United States House Committee on Science, Space and Technology, United States House Committee on Appropriations, United States House Science Subcommittee on Research and Technology, Passed the House on September 15, 2014 (voice vote)

The Revitalize American Manufacturing and Innovation Act of 2013 (H.R. 2996) is a bill that would establish the Network for Manufacturing Innovation Program (NMIP) within the National Institute of Standards and Technology (NIST). Under the program, NIST would award grants to establish a network of centers of innovation to improve the competitiveness of domestic manufacturers.

The bill was introduced into the United States House of Representatives during the 113th United States Congress.

== Provisions of the bill ==
This summary is based largely on the summary provided by the Congressional Research Service, a public domain source.

The Revitalize American Manufacturing and Innovation Act of 2013 would amend the National Institute of Standards and Technology Act to direct the United States Secretary of Commerce to establish within the Institute (NIST) a Network for Manufacturing Innovation Program. Includes among Program purposes to: (1) improve the competitiveness of U.S. manufacturing and increase domestic production; (2) stimulate U.S. leadership in advanced manufacturing research, innovation, and technology; and (3) accelerate the development of an advanced manufacturing workforce.

The bill would require the Secretary to: (1) establish a network of centers for manufacturing innovation, to be known as the Network for Manufacturing Innovation; and (2) award financial assistance to assist in planning, establishing, or supporting such centers.

The bill would direct the Secretary to establish within NIST the National Office of the Network for Manufacturing Innovation Program to: (1) oversee the Program, (2) enter into memorandums of understanding with federal agencies whose missions contribute to or are affected by advanced manufacturing, (3) develop and periodically update a strategic plan for the Program, (4) establish procedures to maximize cooperation and coordinate Program activities with those of other federal agencies, (5) establish a clearinghouse of public information related to Program activities, and (6) act as a convener of the Network.

The bill would require the Secretary to ensure that the Office incorporates the Hollings Manufacturing Extension Partnership into Program planning to ensure that the results of the Program reach small- and medium-sized entities.

The bill would establish in the Treasury a Network for Manufacturing Innovation Fund for carrying out the Program.

== Congressional Budget Office report ==
This summary is based largely on the summary provided by the Congressional Budget Office, as ordered reported by the House Committee on Science, Space, and Technology on July 25, 2014. This is a public domain source.

H.R. 2996 would establish the Network for Manufacturing Innovation Program (NMIP) within the National Institute of Standards and Technology (NIST). Under the program, NIST would award grants to establish a network of centers of innovation to improve the competitiveness of domestic manufacturers. H.R. 2996 also would reauthorize a program to develop regional clusters of businesses that operate in similar or complementary industries. Finally, the bill would require the Government Accountability Office (GAO) to assess the NMIP every two years and direct NIST to develop a strategic plan for advanced manufacturing that would be updated every four years.

The Congressional Budget Office (CBO) estimates that implementing H.R. 2996 would cost $105 million over the 2015-2019 period, assuming appropriation actions consistent with the bill. Enacting H.R. 2996 also would affect direct spending; therefore, pay-as-you-go procedures apply. CBO estimates, however, that such effects would be insignificant. Enacting H.R. 2996 would not affect revenues.

H.R. 2996 contains no intergovernmental or private-sector mandates as defined in the Unfunded Mandates Reform Act, and any costs to state, local, or tribal governments, including matching funds, would be incurred as conditions of receiving federal assistance.

== Procedural history ==
The Revitalize American Manufacturing and Innovation Act of 2013 was introduced into the United States House of Representatives on August 2, 2014, by Rep. Tom Reed (R, NY-23). It was referred to the United States House Committee on Science, Space and Technology, the United States House Committee on Appropriations, and the United States House Science Subcommittee on Research and Technology. On September 15, 2014, the House voted to pass the bill in a voice vote.

== Debate and discussion ==
IPC's president John Mitchell advocated in favor of the bill, calling it a "critical piece of legislation." IPC - Association Connecting Electronics Industries considered getting the bill passed a top priority.

Lockheed Martin supported the bill.

The Optical Society (OSA) supported the bill after lobbying Rep. Tom Reed (R-NY) to "include language in the bill naming optics and photonics as one of several technology focus areas to consider for a manufacturing center." OSA CEO Elizabeth Rogan called the bill "a win for the optics and photonics industry," arguing that the "United States must demonstrate its commitment to innovation and growth by providing the needed resources to advance high-tech business in this country."

== See also ==
- List of bills in the 113th United States Congress
