= Ouling Auto =

Chinese industrial vehicle manufacturing company

Shandong Tangjun Ouling Automobile Manufacture Co., Ltd.
- Trade name: Ouling Auto
- Type: Subsidiary
- Industry: Automotive
- Founded: 1956; 70 years ago as Zibo Automobile Factory
- Headquarters: Zibo, Shandong, China
- Products: Trucks; Commercial Vehicle
- Brands: T.King Truck; Ouling
- Number of employees: 3000
- Parent: Zhejiang Geely Holding Group
- Website: http://tkingauto.com/

Shandong Tangjun Ouling Automobile Manufacture Co., Ltd. (Chinese: 山东唐骏欧铃汽车制造有限公司 traded as Ouling Auto) is a Chinese automobile manufacturing company part of Geely Farizon New Energy Commercial Vehicle Group.

== History ==
Shandong Tangjun Ouling Automobile was originally founded in 1956 in Zibo, Shandong, and started to produce motor vehicles by 1971. The company specializes in light trucks and specialized vehicle modifications. Products are sold under the T-King (唐骏, Tangjun) brand with the Ouling (欧铃) Chinese name.

In 2012 it was ranked as the 48th manufacturer of motor vehicles by the number of vehicles produced, with 52,708 heavy commercial vehicles and 16,459 light commercial vehicles produced, for a total of 69,167.

In 2021, the company was acquired by Geely and became part of Geely Farizon New Energy Commercial Vehicle Group. The production capacity is 100,000 vehicles per year.

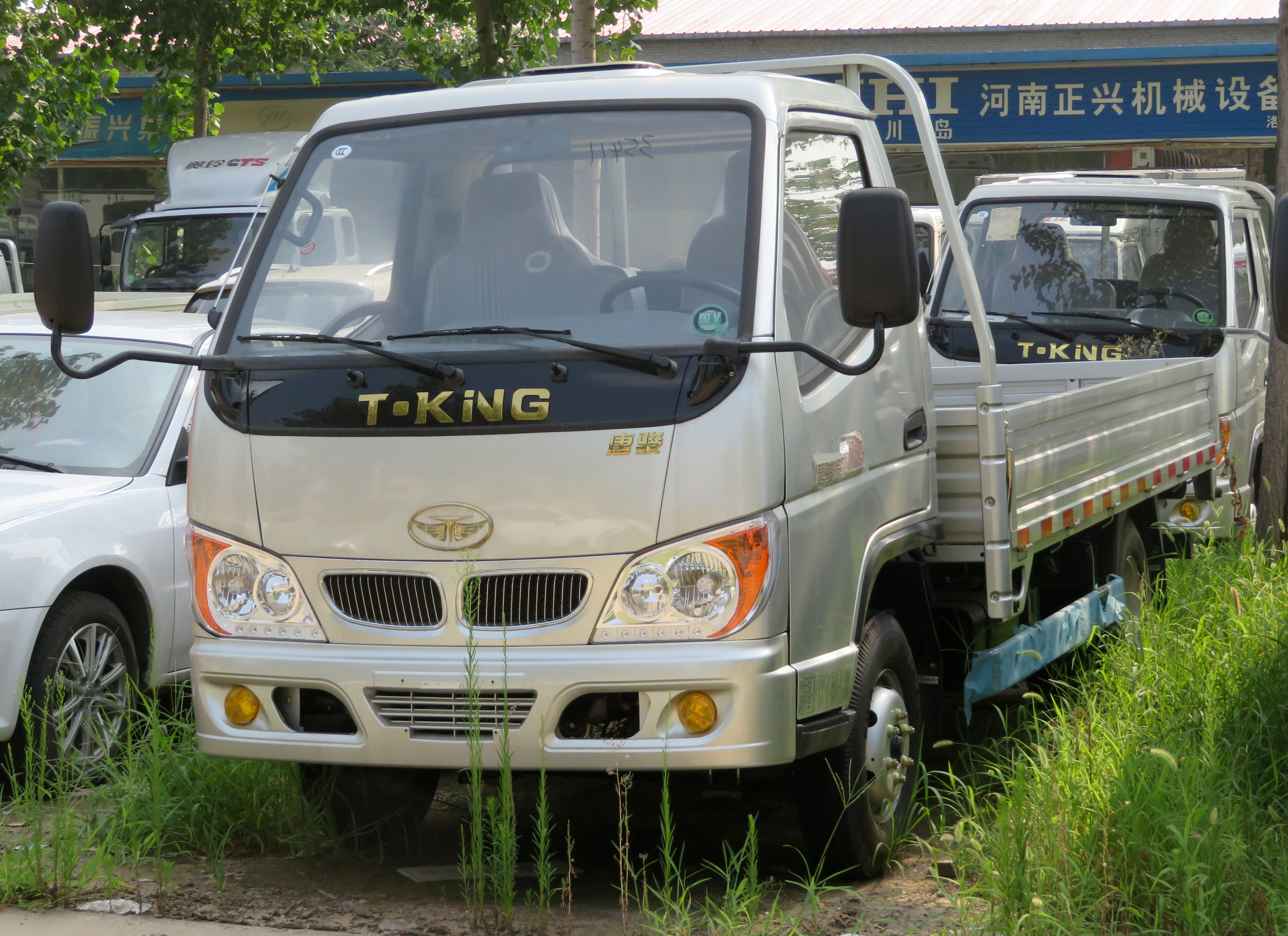
Ouling T-King Xiaobaoma

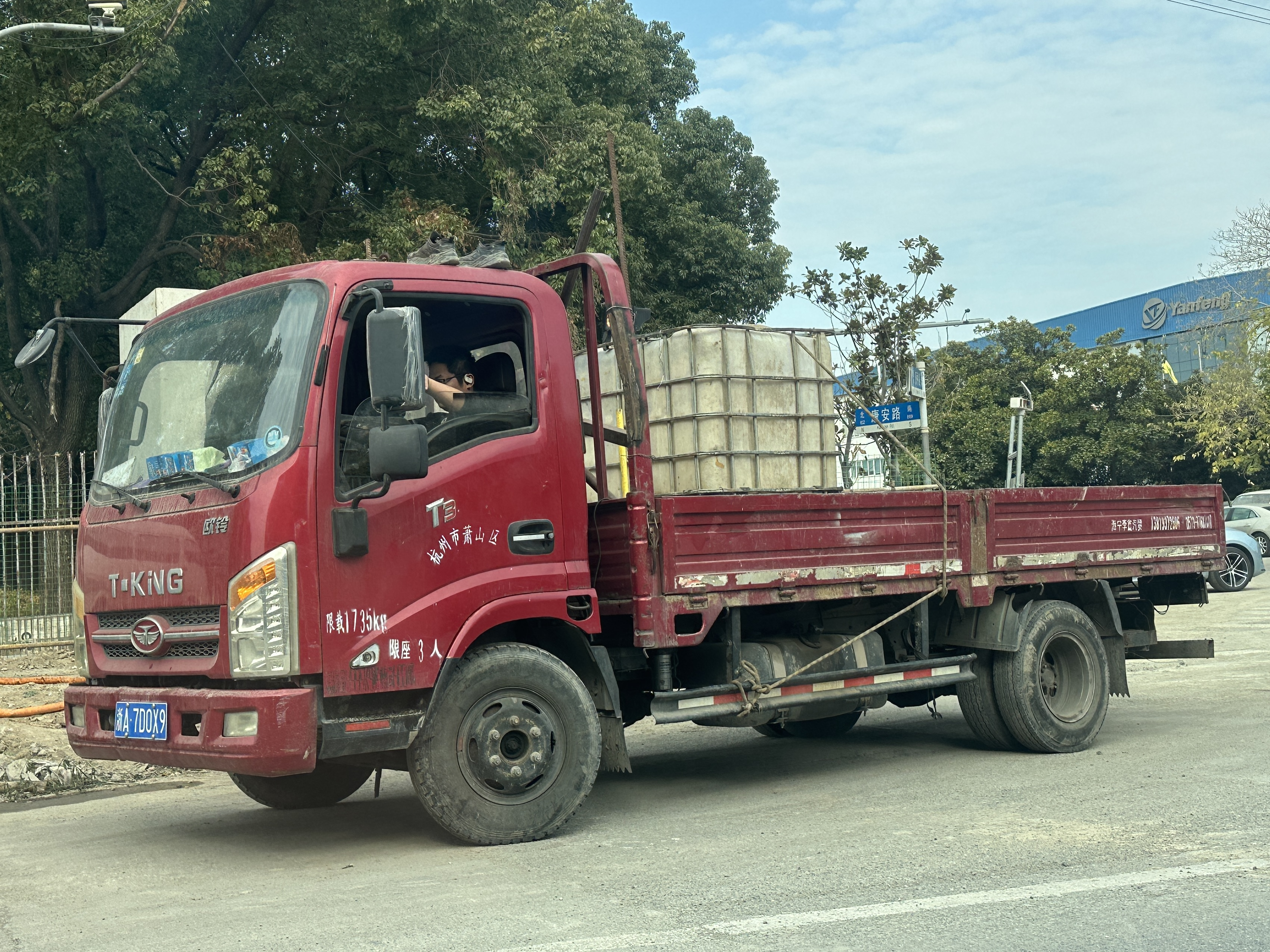
Ouling T-King T3

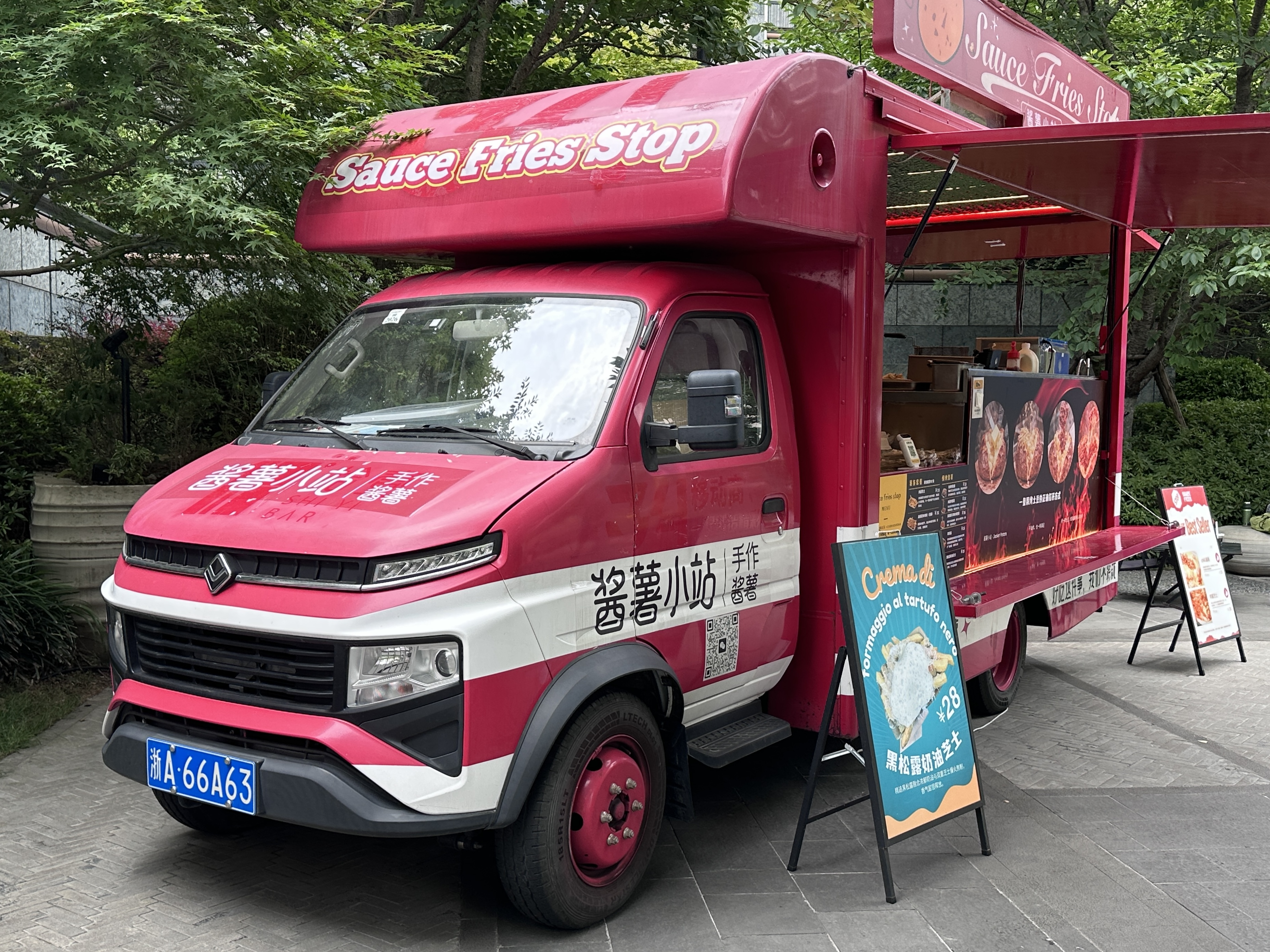
Ouling Fengrui F3

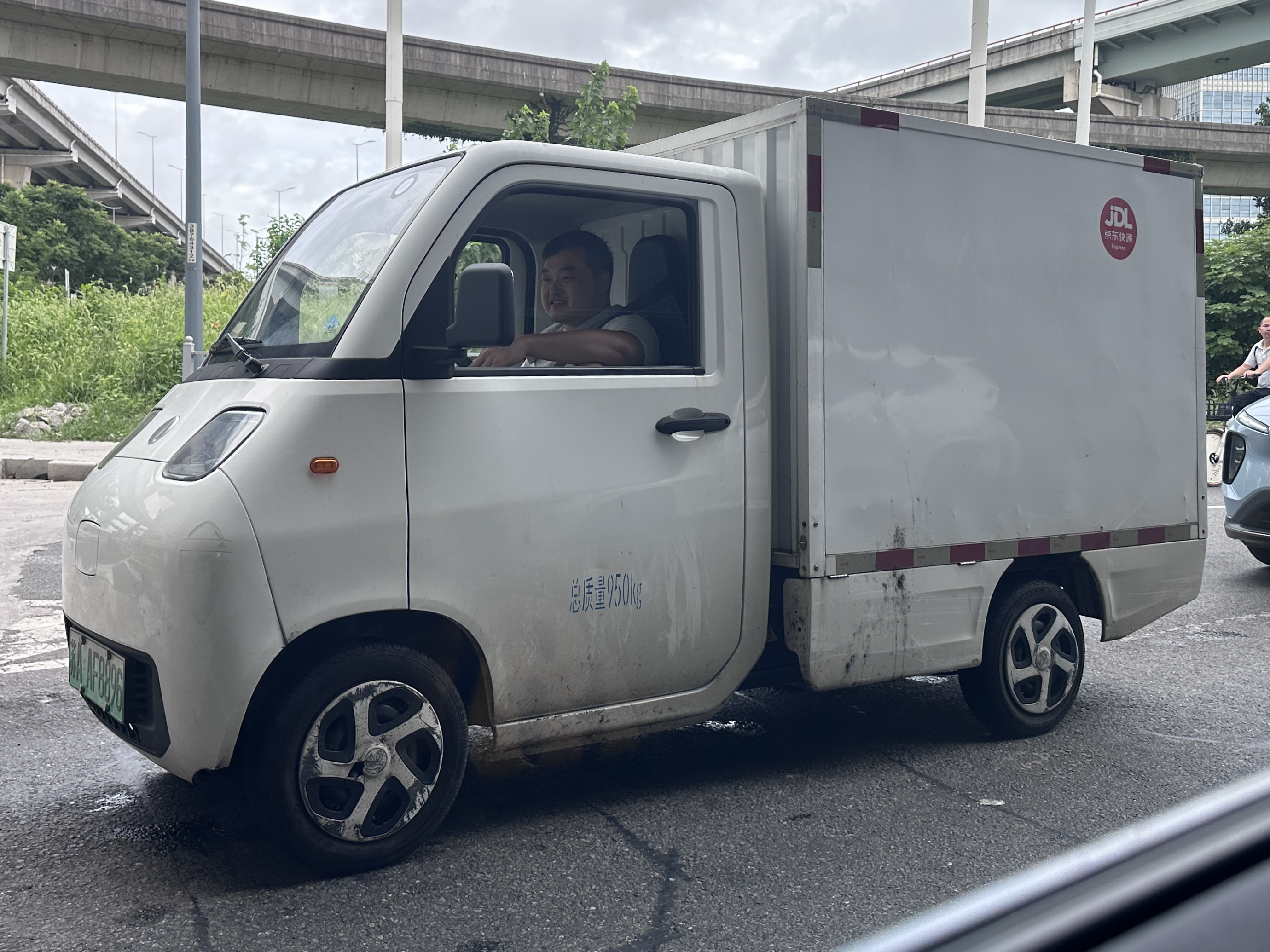
Ouling Huoyue Shentong 01
