= Lid (disambiguation) =

A lid is a cover or seal for a container.

Lid or LID may also refer to:

== Business and organizations ==
- League for Industrial Democracy, an American political party
- Left and Democrats (Lewica i Demokraci), a former electoral alliance in Poland
- Alidaunia, an Italian airline (ICAO code: LID)

== People with the surname ==
- Dagny Tande Lid (1901–1998), Norwegian painter, illustrator and poet
- Glenn D. Lid (born 1957), American educator
- Hilde Synnøve Lid (born 1971), Norwegian freestyle skier
- Johannes Lid (1886–1971), Norwegian botanist
- Mons Lid (1896–1967), Norwegian politician
- Tore Vagn Lid (born 1973), Norwegian theatre director, playwright, musician, and artistic director
- Olav Lid (1908–1998), Norwegian jurist

== Science and technology ==
- Light-weight Identity, an identity management system for online digital identities
- Lithium deuteride (^{6}LiD), a fusion fuel in thermonuclear weapons

== Other uses ==
- Eyelid
- Freeway lid, a type of deck bridge built on top of a controlled-access highway
- Khirbat Lid, a depopulated Palestinian village
- Light Infantry Division, of the Myanmar Army
- Location identifier, in aviation
- Latent iron deficiency, a medical condition
- Low-impact development (U.S. and Canada), a term in land planning
- Low-impact development (UK), a term in land planning
- Nyindrou language, ISO 639-3 language code: lid
- Love Is Dead, a studio album by Chvrches

== See also ==
- Lids (disambiguation)
- IID (disambiguation)
- Beit Lid, a Palestinian town in the West Bank
  - Khirbat Bayt Lid, a depopulated Palestinian village
