= D2 =

D2, D02, D.II, D II or D-2 may refer to:

== Places ==
- Dublin 2, a Dublin, Ireland postcode
- Mount Dulang-dulang, the second highest mountain of the Philippines
- D2, a line of Moscow Central Diameters
- D2 Place One and Two, at Cheung Yue Street and Cheung Shun Street, in Cheung Sha Wan, MTR Lai Chi Kok Station Exit D1 and D2.

=== Highways ===
- D2 motorway (Czech Republic)
- D2 road (Croatia), a state route in Croatia
- D2 motorway (Slovakia)

== Arts & entertainment ==
- D-2 (mixtape), a 2020 album by South Korean rapper Agust D
- D2: The Mighty Ducks, the second film in The Mighty Ducks trilogy
- R2-D2, a robotic Star Wars character
- "D²", a 2002 episode of Dexter's Laboratory
- D2 (video game), a 1999 game for the Sega Dreamcast
- D2, an abbreviation of the video game Diablo II or Destiny 2
- D2, a sub-group of the Japanese male acting troupe D-Boys
- Dhoom 2, a 2006 Indian Hindi-language action film by Sanjay Gadhvi, second part of the Dhoom film series

== Business ==
- D2 (hotel chain), owned by Dusit Thani Group
- D2 Mannesmann, the former name of Vodafone's German division, which resulted from the acquisition of the German company Mannesmann AG
- D2 (magazine), published by Dagens Næringsliv
- D2, formerly the IATA code for defunct Damania Airways
- D2, the IATA airline code for Severstal Avia

== Biology or medicine ==
- ATC code D02 Emollients and protectives, a subgroup of the Anatomical Therapeutic Chemical Classification System
- Dopamine receptor D_{2}, a protein
- Levuglandin D2
- Prostaglandin D_{2} receptor, a G-protein coupled receptor
- Resolvin D2
- Cyclin D2 (CCND2)
- Vitamin D_{2}, or ergocalciferol
- D02, the ICD-10 code for carcinoma in situ of middle ear and respiratory system
- DIO2, Type II iodothyronine deiodinase, an enzyme involved in the thyroid system

== Vehicles ==
=== Aircraft ===
- Albatros D.II, a 1916 German fighter aircraft
- Aviatik (Berg) D.II, a 1917 Austro-Hungarian fighter prototype
- STS-55 or D2, the second German-sponsored Spacelab mission
- Daimler D.II, a Daimler aircraft
- Delta D2, an Australian diesel-powered helicopter design
- Dunne D.2, a British Dunne aircraft
- Euler D.II, a 1917 German single-seat fighter
- Fokker D.II, a WWI German fighter biplane
- Halberstadt D.II, a 1916 German biplane fighter aircraft
- Hughes D-2, a 1943 mysterious American fighter and bomber project
- LFG Roland D.II, a 1917 German single-seat fighter
- Phönix D.II, a variant of the Hungarian First World War biplane fighter D.I
- Schütte-Lanz D.II, a 1915 variant of the German Schütte-Lanz D.I aircraft

=== Aircraft engines ===
- Alfa Romeo D2, a 1931 Italian nine-cylinder radial engine for aircraft use
- Mercedes D.II, a WWI 6-cylinder, liquid-cooled inline aircraft engine

=== Locomotives ===
- Bavarian D II, an 1898 German goods train tank locomotive model
- Bavarian D II (Ostbahn), an 1866 German goods train tender locomotive model
- Bavarian D II (old), an 1873 small tank locomotive
- GS&WR Class D2, a Great Southern and Western Railway Irish steam locomotive
- LB&SCR D2 class, a British locomotive class
- GNR Class D2, a class of British steam locomotives
- PRR D2, an 1868 American steam locomotive model

=== Ships ===
- HMS Attacker (D02), a 1941 American-built escort aircraft carrier
- HMS Devonshire (D02), a 1962 County-class destroyer
- HMS Inglefield (D02), a 1936 I-class destroyer and flotilla leader of the British Royal Navy
- USS D-2 (SS-18), a 1909 American submarine

=== Other vehicles ===
- Char D2, a French tank
- Zhidou D2, a Chinese small electric car

== Electronics ==
- Cowon D2, a 2007 portable media player with touch screen interface
- Datasaab D2, a Swedish concept computer completed in 1960
- d2, a brand of computer peripherals manufactured by the French firm électronique d2, now trading as LaCie
- D2 kit, a microprocessor development kit MEK6800D2
- D-2 (video), a professional digital video format
- DOCSIS 2, a cable modem standard

== Other uses ==
- D_{2}, the Codex Claromontanus, a 6th-century Greek-Latin uncial manuscript of the New Testament
- D_{2}, a dihedral group in group theory
- D_{2}, deuterium, an isotope of hydrogen
- D2, an almond-shaped cloud on Neptune
- D2, the code for permission to use specific land or premises for leisure (cinemas, swimming baths, gymnasiums) in town and country planning in the United Kingdom
- D2, the Double Dragon hacking group
- Division II (disambiguation), in sports leagues, etc.
- Marcelo D2 (born 1967), Brazilian rapper
- D2, an abbreviation for DOCSIS 2.0, an international telecommunications standard
- D2 steel, a type of D-Grade tool steel with good wear resistance commonly found in shears and high-end knives
- D2, gaming notation for a 2-sided die, such as a coin
- D2, a standard paper size between B2 and A1
- D2 Subway, a planned Dallas, Texas light rail tunnel
- D2, a route of the D (SEPTA Metro)

== See also ==
- 2D (disambiguation)
- DII (disambiguation)
