= D2S =

D2S or d2s may refer to:

- D2S, a category for headlamps
- Nintendo 2DS
- Formula 1: Drive to Survive
- Zhidou D2S

== See also ==
- D2 (disambiguation)
