= D2 class =

D2 class or Class D2 may refer to:

- D2-class Melbourne tram
- GNR Class D2, 4-4-0 steam locomotives
- LB&SCR D2 class, 0-4-2 steam locomotives
- Pennsylvania Railroad class D2, 4-4-0 steam locomotives
- Victorian Railways D2 class, 4-6-0 steam locomotives
