= Zhidou D3 =

Overview
- Manufacturer: Zhidou Auto
- Also called: Uniti Zero
- Production: 2017–2019
- Assembly: China: Ningbo

Body and chassis
- Class: Microcar
- Body style: 3-door hatchback

Dimensions
- Wheelbase: 1,865 mm (73.4 in)
- Length: 2,975 mm (117.1 in)
- Width: 1,585 mm (62.4 in)
- Height: 1,590 mm (62.6 in)

The Zhidou D3 is an all-electric microcar manufactured by the Chinese manufacturer Zhidou between 2017 and 2019.

== History ==
At the end of 2017, the Chinese automaker Zhidou presented a new, flagship model of the D3 microcar. The vehicle has expanded the offer as a larger, more spacious and more comfortable alternative to the existing range of D1, D2 and D2S models.

Sales of the D3 began in November 2017 on the domestic Chinese market. When it entered the European market in mid-2018, the car was also available in this region.

In late 2021, failing Swedish startup Uniti used an example of the D3 to pitch it to investors as the company's planned new product instead of the unrealized One, modifying the exterior and changing its name to Uniti Zero. However, it was a one-time move that did not translate into mass production, and the company went bankrupt a short time later.

== Specifications ==
The D3 features a fully electric system that is powered by a 17 kWh (61 MJ) battery. This allows the vehicle to achieve a maximum range of up to 200 km (120 mi) on a single charge. At the front, the model is distinguished by a large, chrome element imitating the front grille, as well as narrow headlights. In the passenger cabin, there is rich equipment and a large touch screen.
