= LIDS =

LIDS or lids may refer to:

- MIT Laboratory for Information and Decision Systems, an interdisciplinary research laboratory of MIT, Cambridge, Massachusetts
- Linux Intrusion Detection System, a patch to the Linux kernel
- Lids (store), a store specializing in caps, owned by Fanatics, Inc.
- Low Impact Docking System, a space vehicle mating system designed by NASA
- "Lids", an episode of the television series Zoboomafoo
- Light Integrated Defense Systems

== See also ==
- Lid (disambiguation)
