= Bavarian D II (old) =

Type and origin
- Builder: Krauss
- Build date: 1873
- Total produced: 4
Specifications
- Configuration
  - Whyte: 0-4-0T
- Gauge: 1,435 mm (4 ft 8 1/2 in)
- Driver dia.: 820 mm (2 ft 8 1/4 in)
- Length
  - Over beams: ca. 6,100 mm (20 ft 1/4 in)
- Axle load: 7.4 t (7.3 long tons; 8.2 short tons) (avge.)
- Adhesive weight: 14.8 t (14.6 long tons; 16.3 short tons)
- Service weight: 14.8 t (14.6 long tons; 16.3 short tons)
- Water cap.: 2.3 m^{3} (510 imp gal; 610 US gal)
- Boiler pressure: 10 kgf/cm^{2} (981 kPa; 142 lbf/in^{2})
- Heating surface
  - Evaporative: 31 m^{2} (330 sq ft)
- Cylinders: 2
- Cylinder size: 225 mm (8 7/8 in)
- Piston stroke: 400 mm (15 3/4 in)
- Valve gear: Allan, outside
Career
- Numbers: 562–565
- Retired: by 1894

The first class of steam locomotive to be designated the D II by the Royal Bavarian State Railways (Königlich Bayerische Staatsbahn) comprised small tank locomotives with two coupled axles. Because these engines were retired very early, from 1891 to 1898, their class number was reused for the six-coupled shunter introduced in 1898 and which later became the DRG Class 89.60.

The original D II was the smallest standard gauge locomotive ever owned by the Bavarian State Railway. It was based on a design by Krauss which was delivered in numerous variants for different purposes to stations and construction firms. The boiler had a regulator housing behind the chimney instead of a steam dome from which the steam pipes ran to the cylinders on the outside of the boiler. The steam supply was controlled by an outside Allan valve gear. The engines ran on cast iron disc wheels and has a well tank, i.e. the space between sole bars of the locomotive frame was used for the water tank. The driver's cab initially had just a free-standing roof; later the engines were give a full cab with a roof that sloped towards the front.

Four engines were delivered with the names: GEIER, STRAUSS, FUCHS and BÄR. The D II was used in the early 1870s on the Vizinalbahn lines from Siegelsdorf to Langenzenn, Immenstadt to Sonthofen and Georgensgmünd to Spalt. BÄR was deployed to the Immenstadt to Sonthofen line, which had been opened in 1873, and STRAUSS was used on the line from Siegelsdorf to Langenzenn, to be joined later by the other engines.

An excellent 1:10 model of BÄR is displayed in the Nuremberg Transport Museum.

== Sources ==
- v. Welser, Ludwig. Bayern-Report, Band Nr. 5. Eisenbahn Journal Archiv IV/95. ISBN 3-922404-78-2.

== See also ==
- Royal Bavarian State Railways
- List of Bavarian locomotives and railbuses
- Bavarian D II
