= Nordia =

Moshav in central Israel

Nordia: נוֹרְדִיָּה (Hebrew)
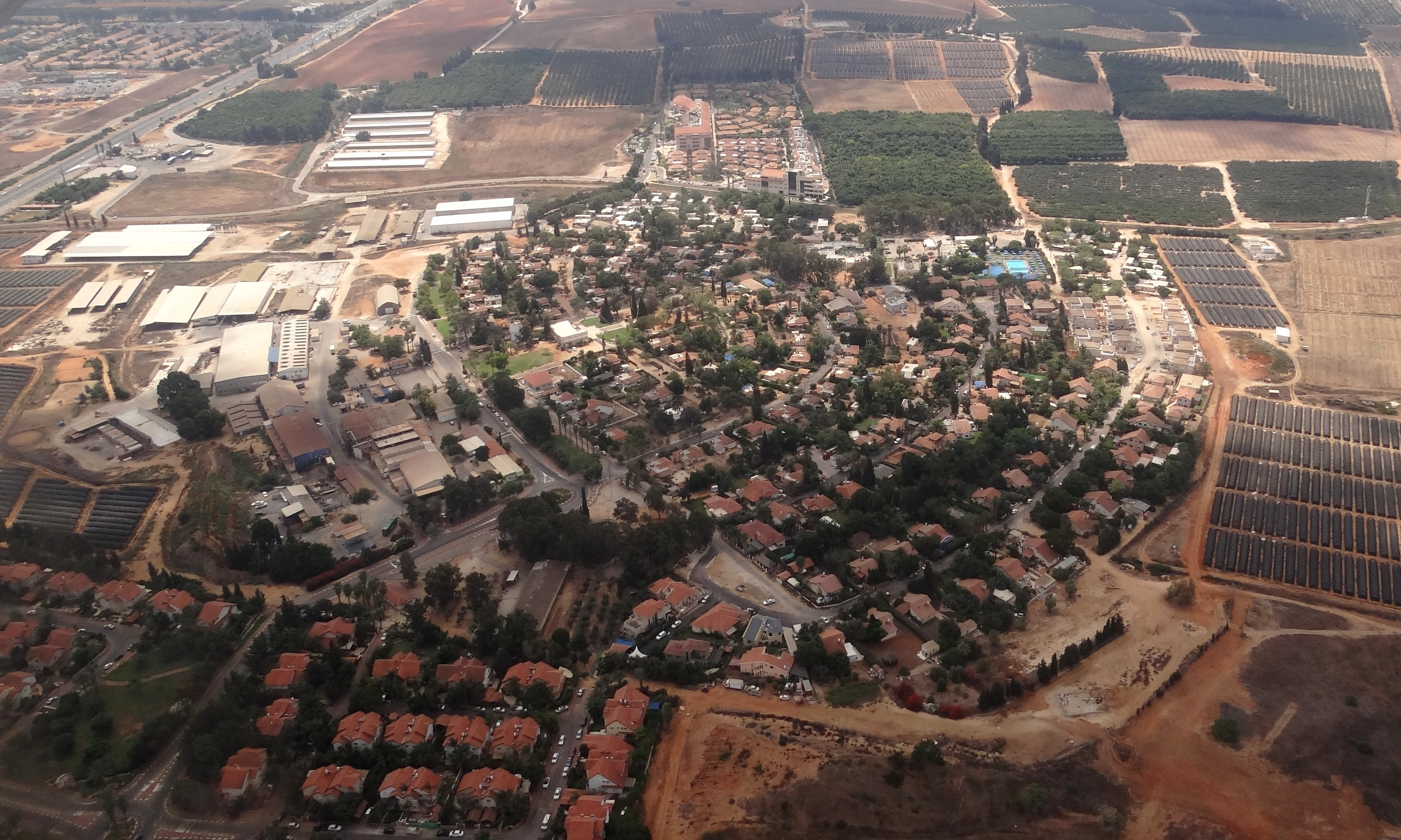

- Location within Central Israel
- Coordinates: 32°18′52″N 34°53′45″E
- Country: Israel
- District: Central
- Subdistrict: HaSharon
- Council: Lev HaSharon
- Affiliation: Mishkei Herut Beitar
- Founded: 1948
- Founder: Demobilised soldiers
- Population (2024): 2,128
- Website: www.nordiya.org

Nordia (Hebrew: נוֹרְדִיָּה) is a moshav shitufi in central Israel. Located in the Sharon plain near Netanya and the HaSharon Junction, it falls under the jurisdiction of Lev HaSharon Regional Council. In 2024 it had a population of 2,128.

== History ==
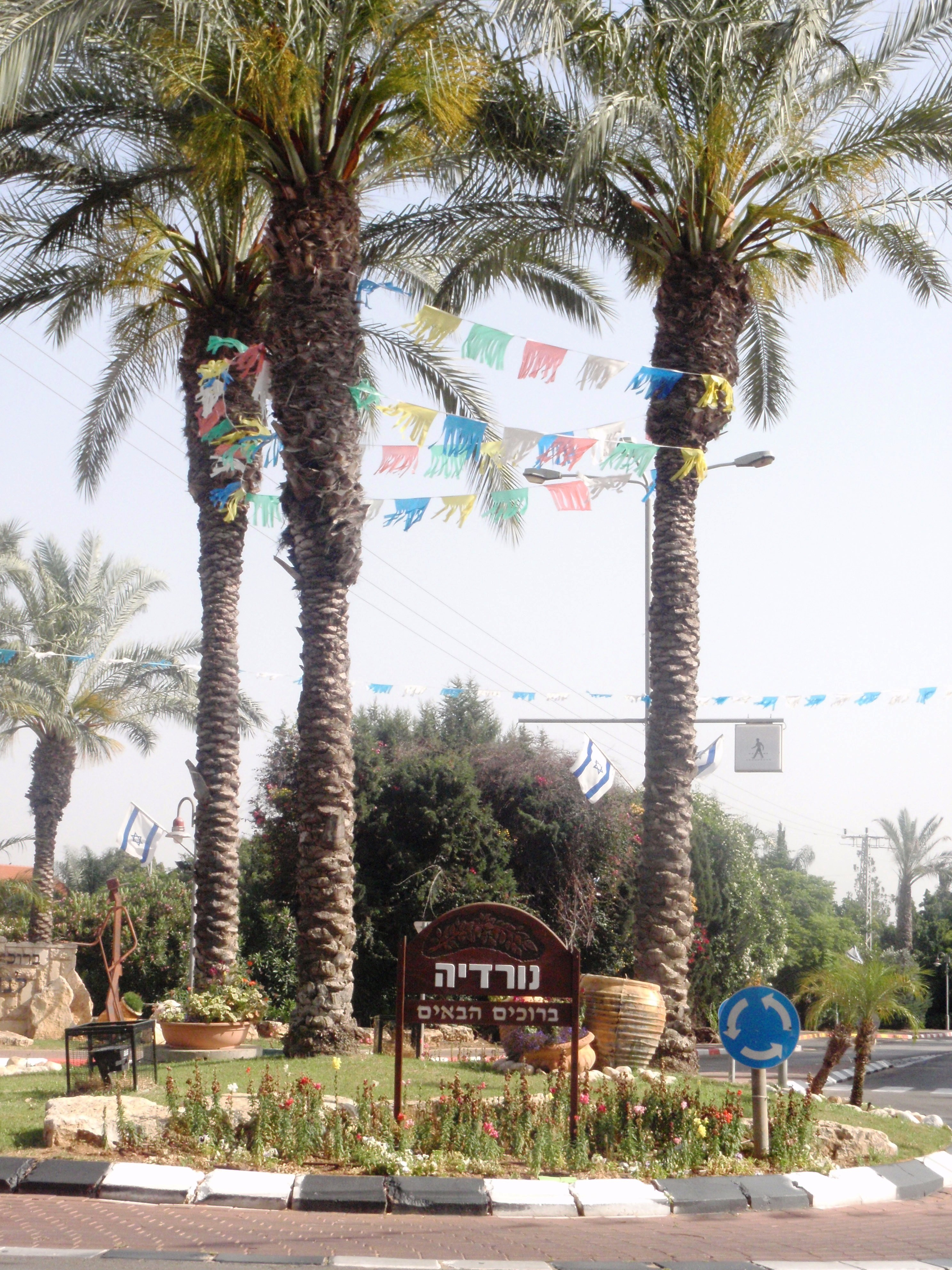
Entrance to Nordia

In 1926 the American Zion Commonwealth announced plans to establish a new agricultural village to be named "Nordia" in memory of the Zionist leader Max Nordau. Land was sold in the United States for this purpose, but the plan did not come to fruition.

Nordia was founded on 2 November 1948 by demobilised Irgun and Betar soldiers, members of the Herut movement, on land near the depopulated Palestinian village of Khirbat Bayt Lid, The founders came from two units – Margolim based in Kfar Yona and Wedgwood (named after Josiah Wedgwood) based in Mishmar HaYarden.

In 1994 a new neighborhood, Neot Nordia, was established.

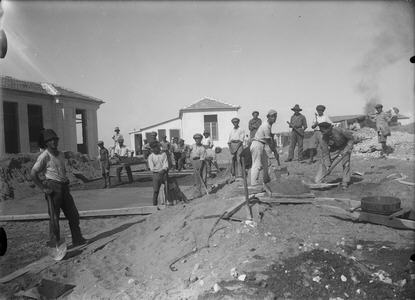
Nordia first attempt to establish settlement 1924

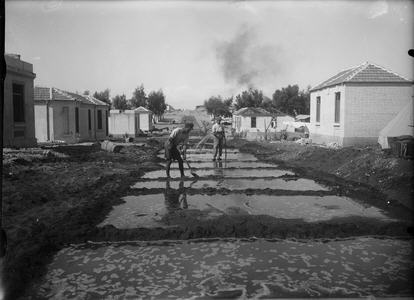
Nordia 1924

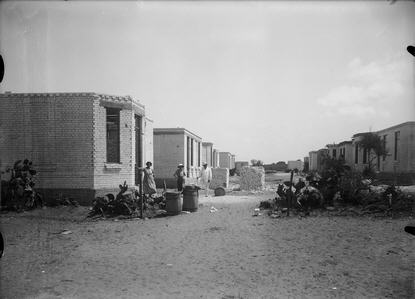
Nordia 1924

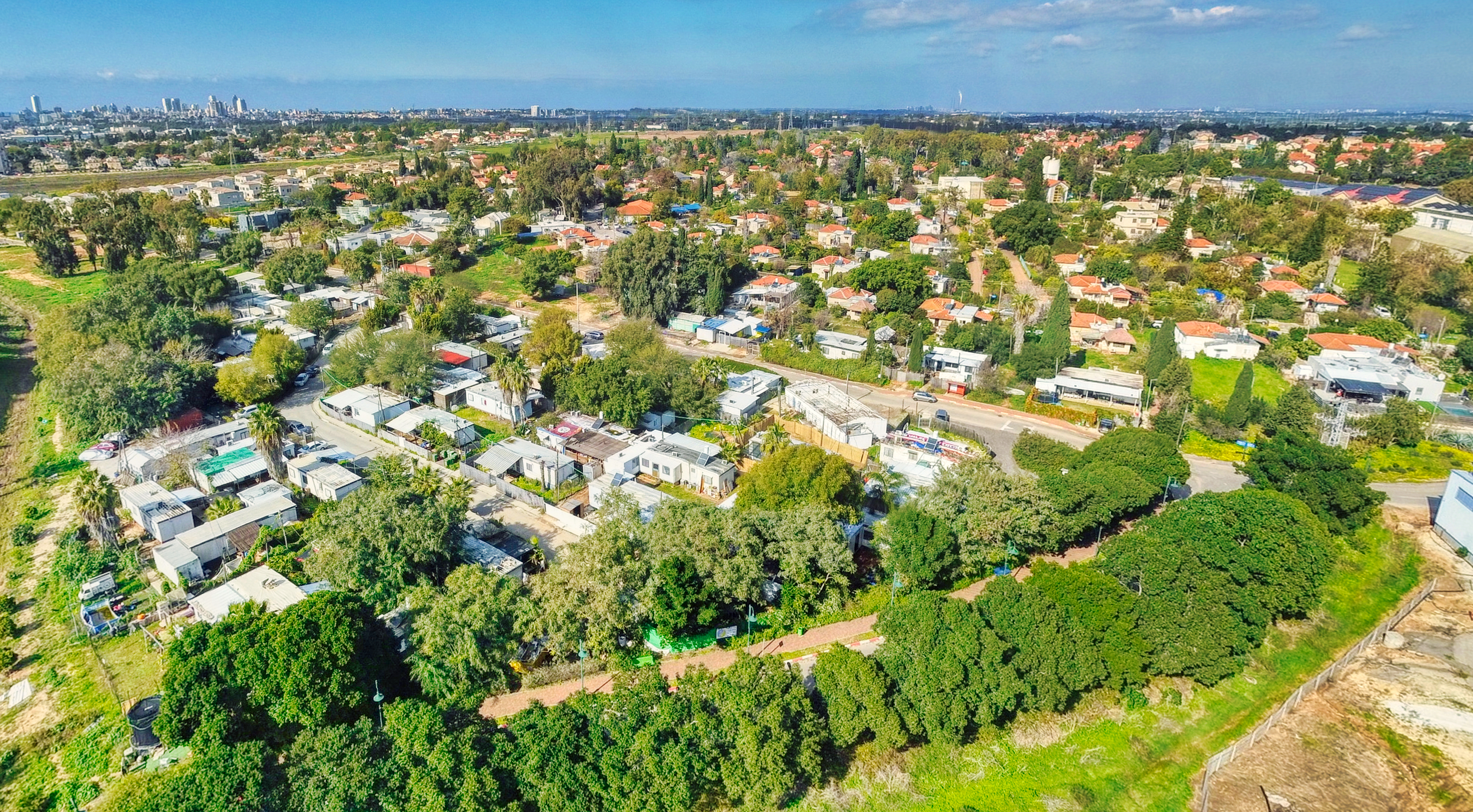
Nordia 2022

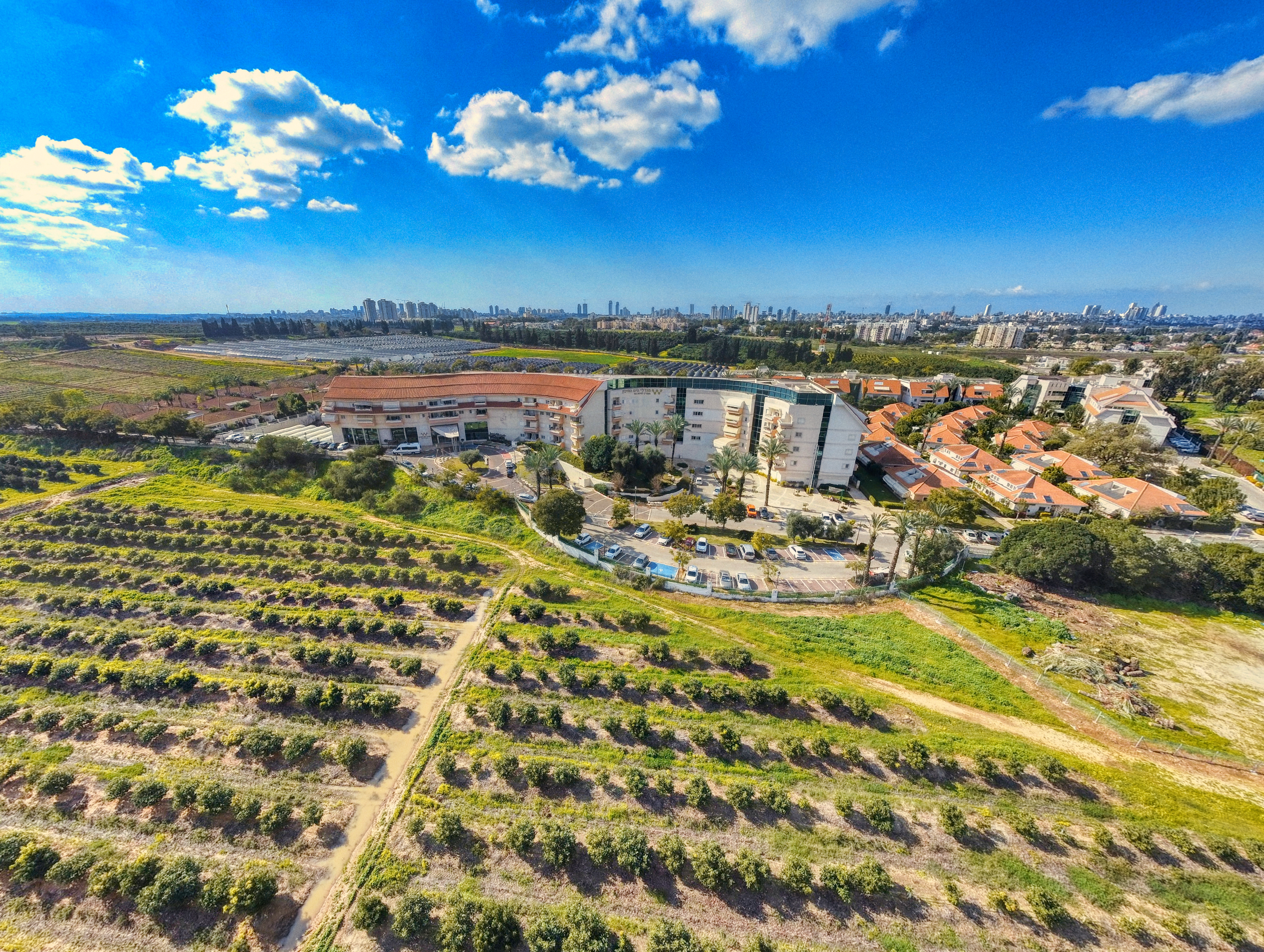
Nordia Assisted Living 2022
