= Zhidou Rainbow =

Battery electric city car

Overview
- Manufacturer: Zhidou Auto
- Production: 2024–present
- Assembly: China: Nanjing

Body and chassis
- Class: City car (A)
- Body style: 3-door hatchback

Dimensions
- Wheelbase: 2,100 mm (82.7 in)
- Length: 3,224 mm (126.9 in)
- Width: 1,515 mm (59.6 in)
- Height: 1,630 mm (64.2 in)
- Curb weight: 800 kg (1,764 lb)

The Zhidou Rainbow is a battery electric city car manufactured by the Chinese manufacturer Zhi Dou Electric Vehicle Corporation sometimes called Zhidou Auto or ZD Auto.

== Overview ==
After the reactivation of the bankrupt Zhidou company in 2023, among others, On the initiative of the Chinese government and Geely, in March 2024, the company presented the first new model since 2018 in the form of an electric Rainbow microcar. Although it retained the form of a 3-door hatchback, it became significantly larger compared to the company's previously produced models. The body has gained characteristic, angular proportions with a narrow and slender body shape, thus reflecting visual features, including: competitive Wuling Hongguang Mini EV.

The Rainbow was built of the Chinese market in mind, going on sale there a month after the presentation of the official technical specification, in April 2024.

== Specifications ==
The Rainbow is a fully electric car that offer two engines, a 27 hp (20 kW) engine or the more powerful one with 40 hp (30 kW). The former went on sale with a 17.18 kWh (61.8 MJ) battery offering a range in mixed mode of up to 201 km (125 mi) in CLTC mode, and the more powerful version was combined with a slightly larger 17.30 kWh (62.3 MJ) battery allowing a range of up to 205 km (127 mi).

Despite the small, 3.2-meter body, there is space inside for 4 passengers in two rows of seats. The passenger cabin was kept in a light tone combining white with body-colored accents, with a two-spoke steering wheel and two displays serving as a digital instrument panel and a centrally placed touch screen of the multimedia system.
