= 2D =

2D or 2-D may refer to:

== Related to two dimensions ==
- Two-dimensional space
- Two-dimensional Euclidean space
- 2D geometric model
- 2D computer graphics
- 2D animation, or traditional animation
- Two-dimensional correlation analysis

== Other uses ==
- 2d abbreviation of second, the ordinal numeral corresponding to two
- 2-D, the fictional lead singer of the virtual band Gorillaz
- Index finger, the second digit (abbreviated 2D) of the hand
- Oflag II-D, a prisoner-of-war camp
- Stalag II-D, a prisoner-of-war camp
- Transcription factor II D
- Two Dickinson Street Co-op, a student dining cooperative at Princeton University
- Nintendo 2DS, the third iteration in the Nintendo 3DS line, released in 2013
- New Nintendo 2DS XL, the sixth iteration in the Nintendo 3DS line, released in 2017 and a larger version of the 2DS
- 2degrees, New Zealand telecommunications provider
- Twopence (British pre-decimal coin), routinely abbreviated 2d.

== See also ==
- D2 (disambiguation)
- IID (disambiguation)
