= Zhidou =

Chinese automotive company

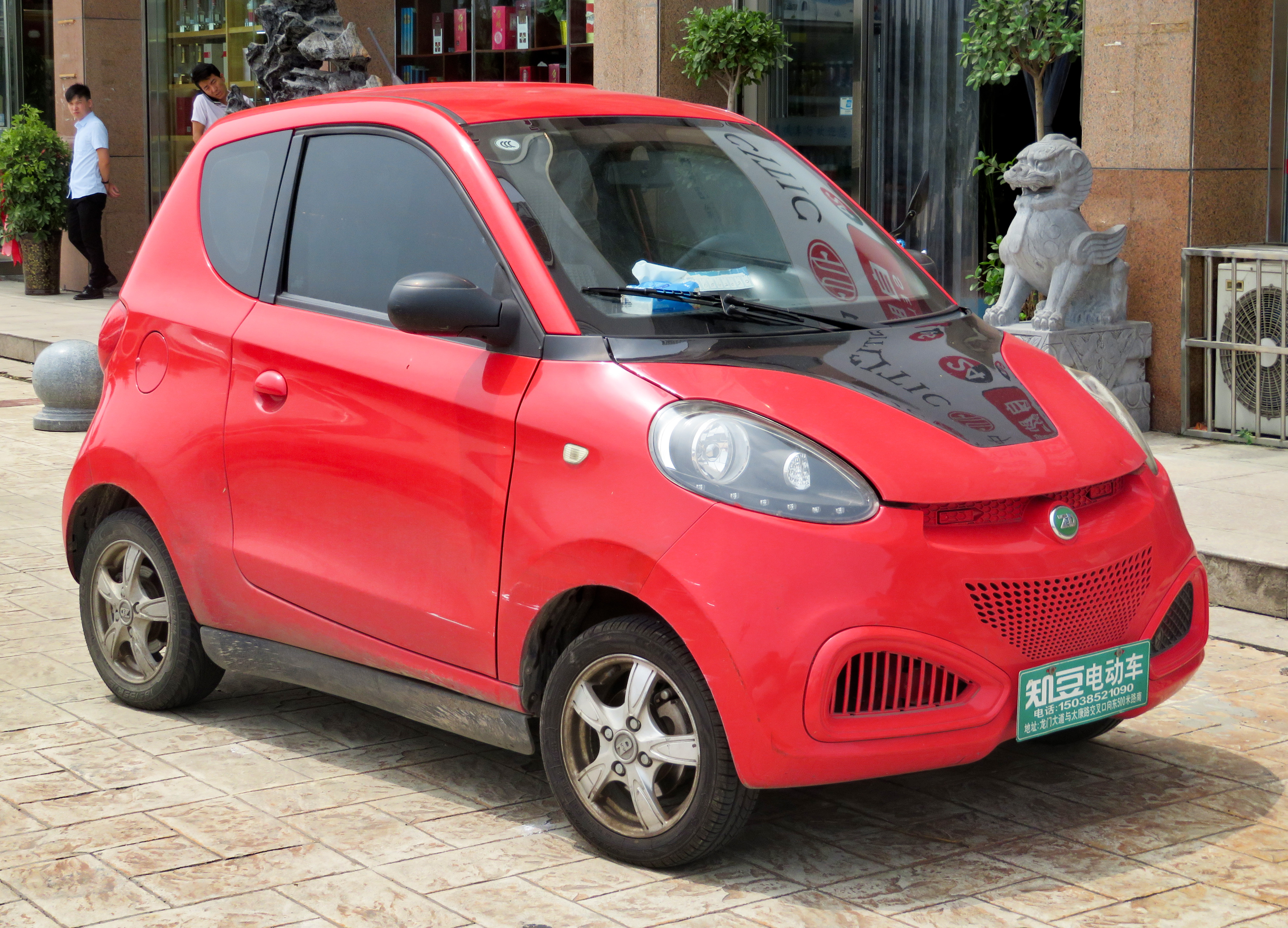
- Native name: 知豆
- Romanized name: Zhido (since 2024)
- Company type: Limited liability company, Private enterprise
- Industry: Automotive
- Founded: 2015; 11 years ago
- Founder: Bao Wenguang
- Headquarters: Ningbo, China
- Key people: Chairman: Bao Wenguang
- Products: Electric microcars
- Website: www.evcar.com (Chinese)

Zhidou (Chinese: 知豆; pinyin: zhīdòu) is a Chinese manufacturer of electric microcars, tricycles and scooters based in Hangzhou operating since 2015.

== History ==
In June 2015, the company Zhidou established. Major shareholders includes XDY Machinery and Electronics Group, GSR Ventures as part of a company joint-venture officially named Zhidou Electric Vehicle Co., Ltd. The premiere took place in the year of its creation Microcar Zhidou D1 about the drive Electric vehicle. The vehicle was created by a Chinese company Zotye Auto, which originally developed it as a prototype in 2014. Simultaneously with the premiere Zhidou D1, In 2017, the manufacturer expanded the offer with a modernized and better equipped variant D2. At the end of 2017, the Zhidou model range was expanded with a new model D3 serving as a more comfortable alternative to a cheaper one D2.

Zhidou filed for bankruptcy in 2019 and was liquidated in 2021. Chairman Bao Wenguang was also restricted from high consumption Its production base in Ningbo Ninghai was also abandoned due to bankruptcy. In March 2022, real estate developer Yinyi Shares announced its participation in the restructuring of Zhidou Automobile. But it ended in nothing. Instead, Geely and Aima Technology Group restructured Zhidou from bankruptcy. Operation was reportedly restarted in 2024 by introduced the new electric microcar model called Zhidou Rainbow. Since then, the name Zhidou is also spelled as Zhido.

=== Zhidou in Europe ===
The first sign of Zhidou's presence in Europe was an introduction through the car-sharing company Share 'N Go microcar fleet D1 of Milan in Italy. In turn, 3 years later, in 2018, Zhidou began its expansion into the markets of Western and Central Europe, initiating in July this year the sale of a variant modified for the needs of this region D2S. In November 2018, through Electric Vehicles Poland, the sale Zhidou D2S also started in the Polish market. In February 2019, the microcar appeared in the fleet of the Polish car-sharing company Traficar for a trial period in Warsaw, which ended in October of the same year. The company has not decided to permanently introduce these vehicles to the offer.

== Products ==
- Zhidou D1
- Zhidou D2
- Zhidou D2S
- Zhidou D3
- Zhidou Rainbow
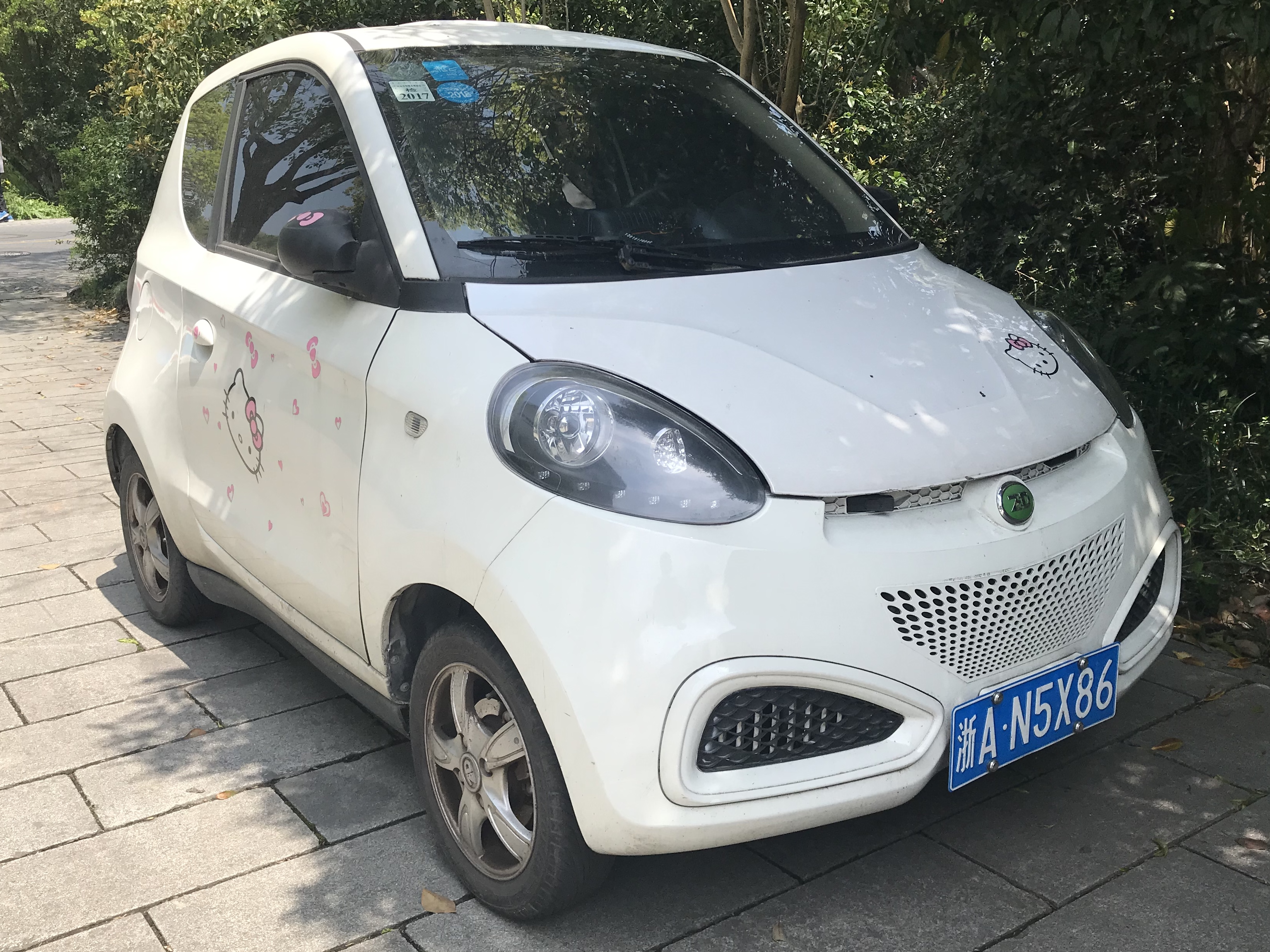
Zhidou D1

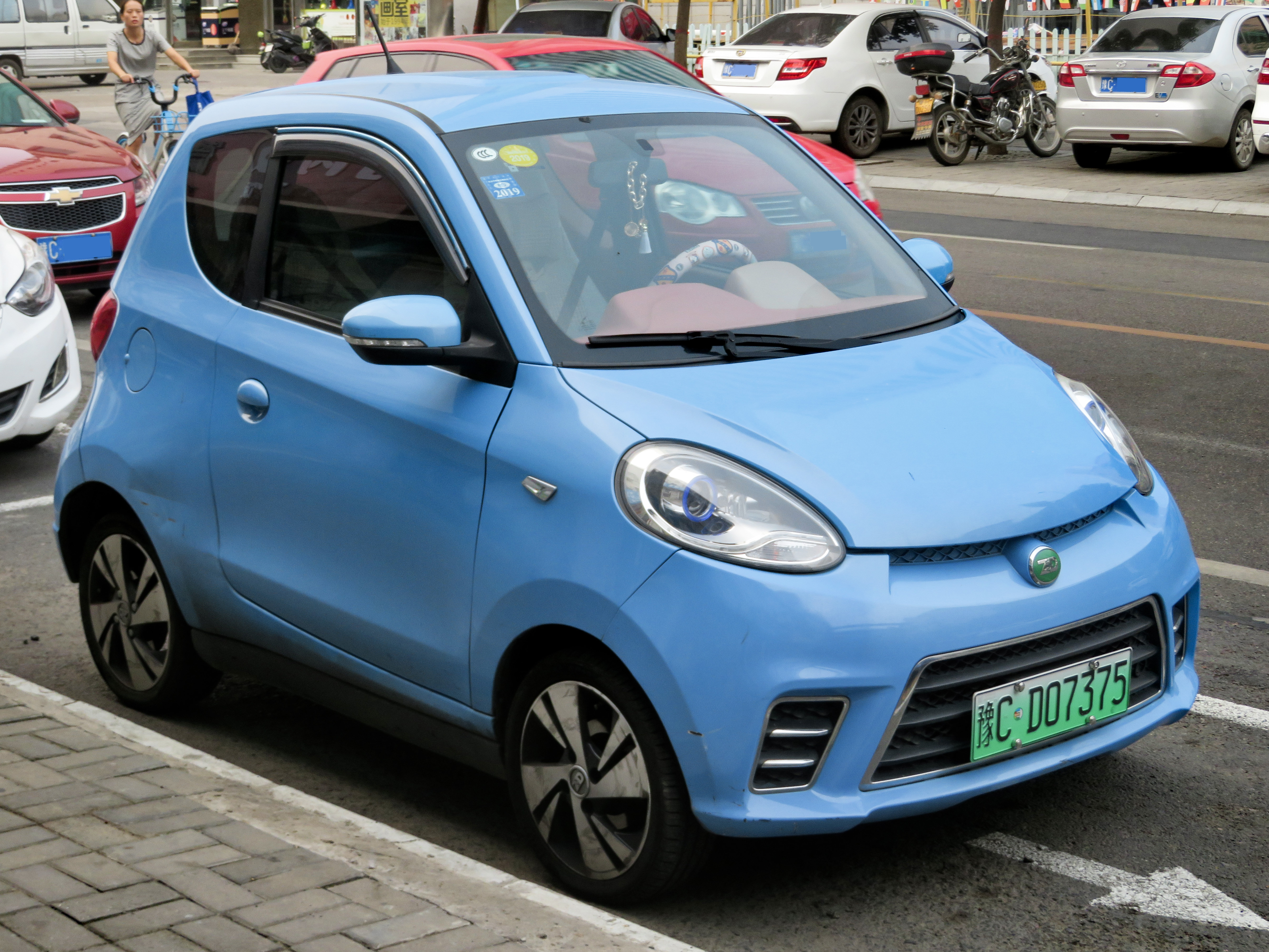
Zhidou D2

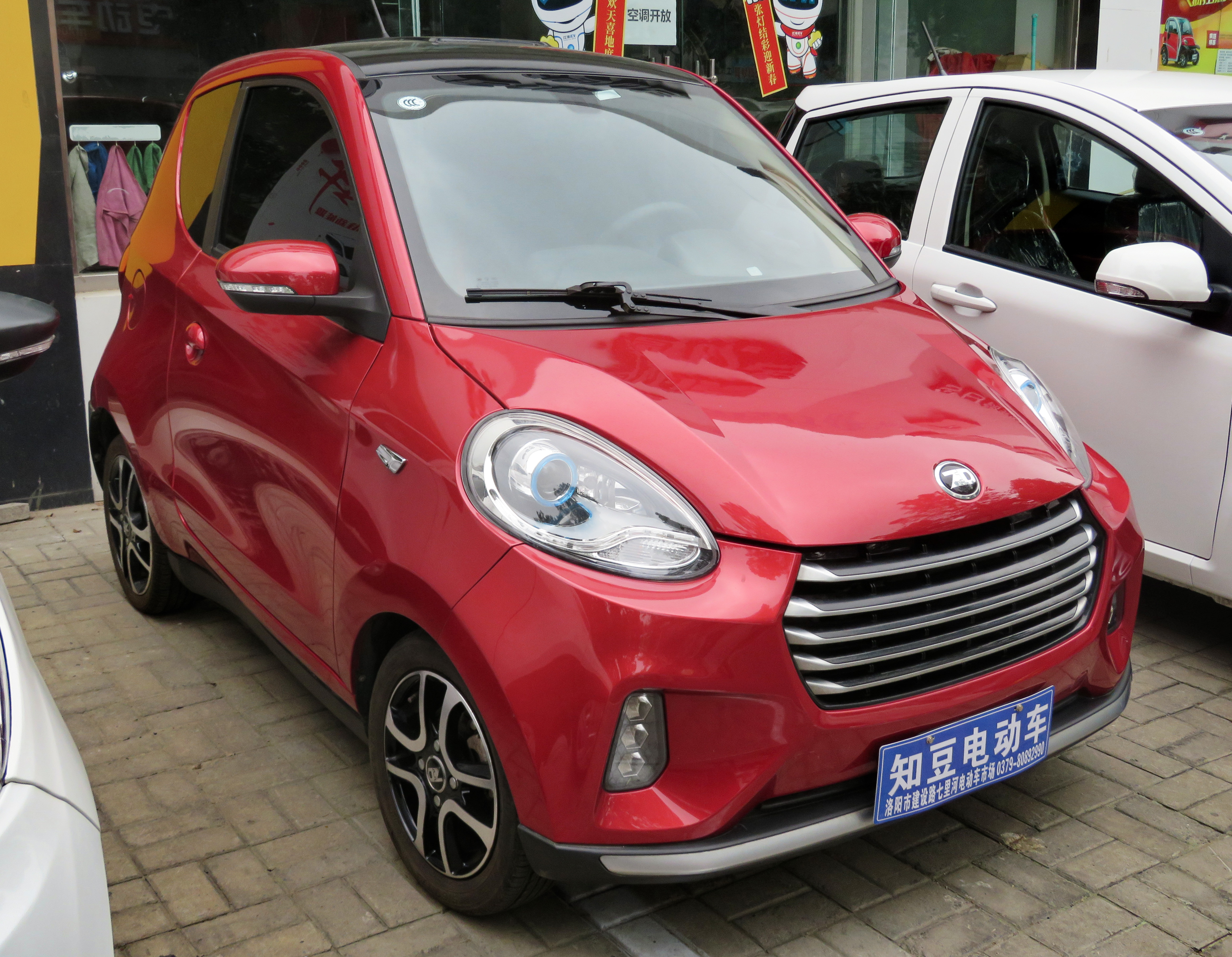
Zhidou D2S
