= DII =

DII may refer to:

- Days in inventory, an accounting term
- Dii, the Thracian tribe
- Dii language
- DiI, a hydrophobic cyanine dye used in cell biology
- Dietary Inflammatory Index
- Delegation of the Ismaili Imamat, the Delegation of the Ismaili Imamat
- Diablo II, a sequel to the computer game Diablo
- Defence Information Infrastructure, the UK's secure military communications network
- Dynamic Invocation Interface, part of the CORBA standard
- 502, DII in Roman numerals

== See also ==
- D2 (disambiguation), including a list of topics named D.II, etc.
