= Khirbat Bayt Lid =

Khirbat Bayt Lid خربة بيت لد Khirbet Beit Lid
- Village
- Etymology: El Mughair=the caves
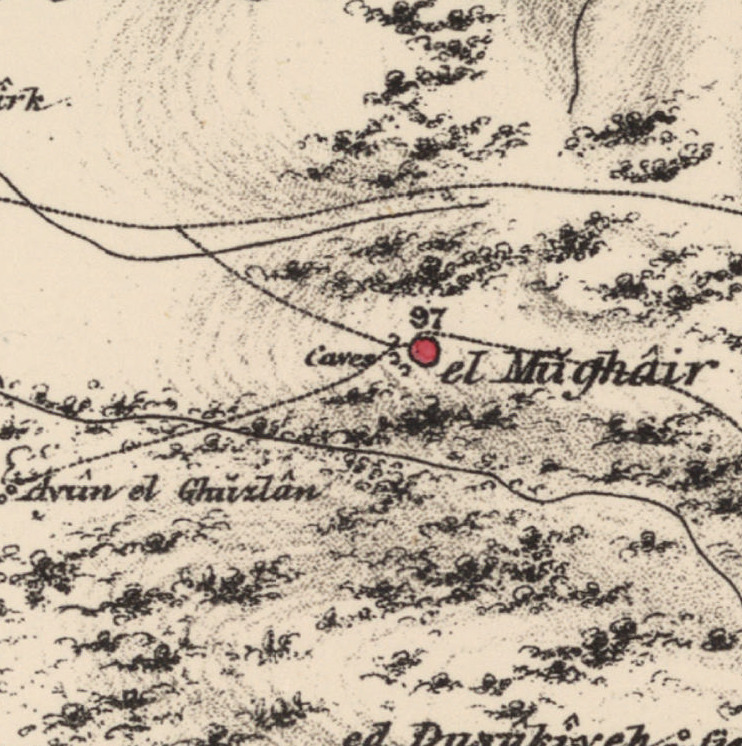
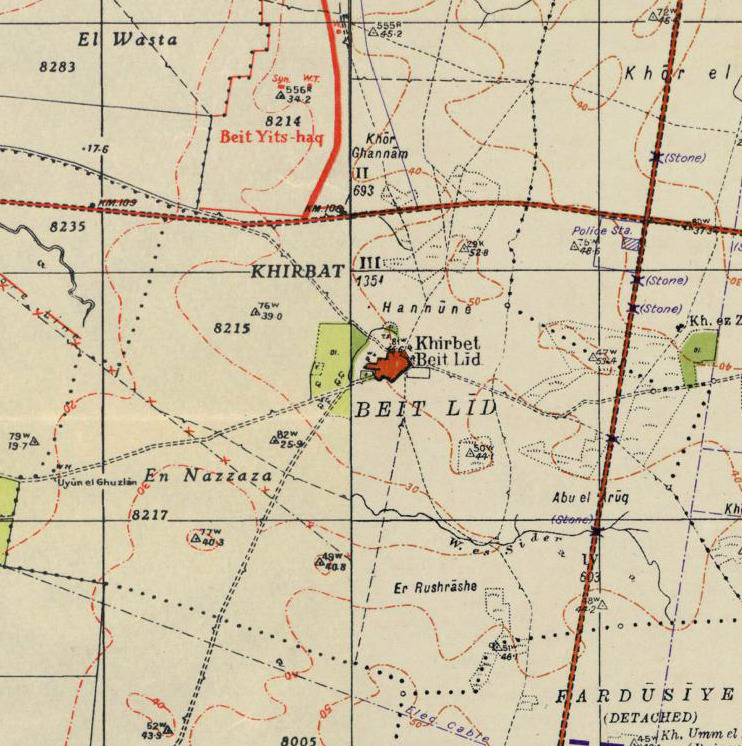
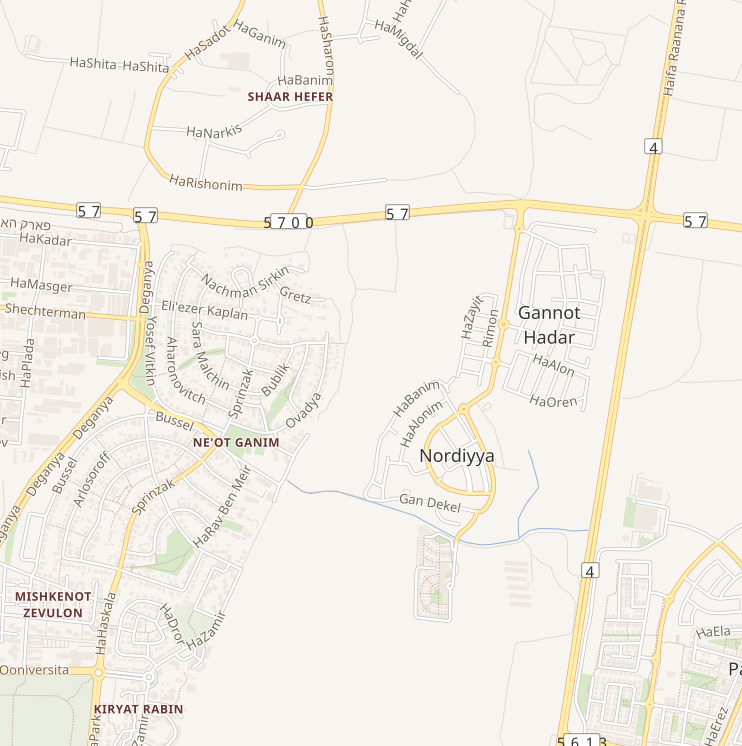
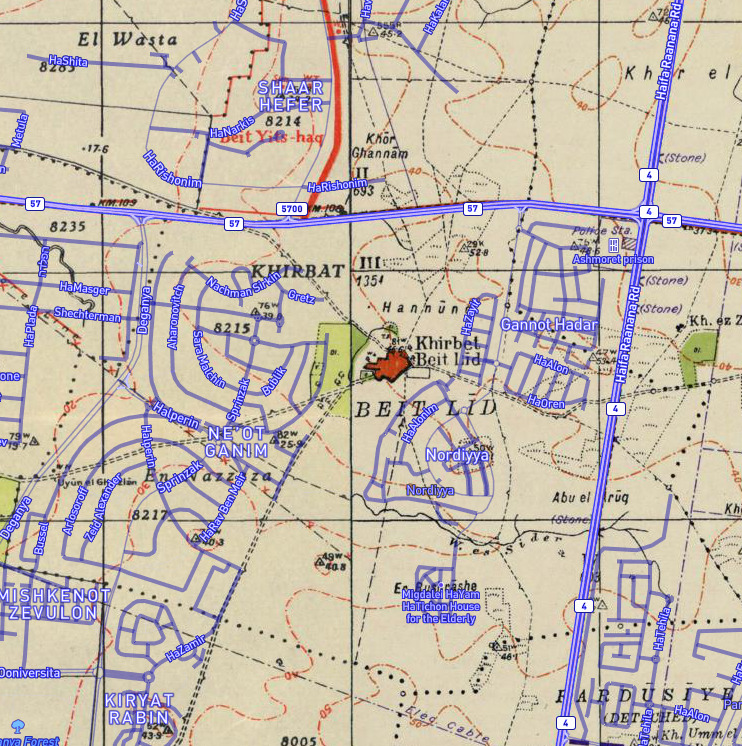
- 1870s map 1940s map modern map 1940s with modern overlay map A series of historical maps of the area around Khirbat Bayt Lid (click the buttons)

- Location within Mandatory Palestine
- Coordinates: 32°19′04″N 34°53′33″E
- Palestine grid: 140/191
- Geopolitical entity: Mandatory Palestine
- Subdistrict: Tulkarm
- Date of depopulation: 5 April 1948

Area (2,969 Arab, 2,220 Jewish)
  - Total: 5,336 dunams (5.336 km^{2}; 2.060 sq mi)

Population
  - Total: 460
- Cause(s) of depopulation: Fear of being caught up in the fighting
- Current Localities: Nordia

Khirbat Bayt Lid (Arabic: خربة بيت لد) was a Palestinian Arab village in the Tulkarm Subdistrict. It was depopulated by its Arab inhabitants during the 1948 Arab–Israeli War.

== History ==
In the 1860s, the Ottoman authorities granted the residents of Beit Lid an agricultural plot of land called in the former confines of the Forest of Arsur (Ar. Al-Ghaba) in the coastal plain, west of the village. The people of Beit Lid than came to farm the lower plain village land. Gradually they settled in the village so they could be closer to their land.

500 meters north of Khirbat Bayt Lid was El Mughair, which was described in 1882 by PEF's Survey of Western Palestine as "a small mud hamlet, with caves. The water supply is from springs a mile to the west."

=== British Mandate era ===
In the 1922 census of Palestine conducted by the British Mandate authorities, Kherbet Bait Lid had a population of 206 Muslims, increasing in the 1931 census to 298 Muslim, in a total of 75 houses.

In the 1945 statistics the population of Khirbat Bayt Lid was 460 Muslims with a total of 5,336 dunams of land, of which 2,969 were owned by Arabs, 2,220 by Jews and 147 was public lands.

Of this, Arabs used 64 dunams for irrigated and plantation land, 2,877 for cereals, while 22 dunams were classified as built-up areas.

Land Usage	Arab	Jewish	Public
Citrus and bananas	-	-	-
Irrigated and plantation	64	7	
Cereal	2,877	2,213	-
Urban	22	-	1
Cultivable	2,941	2,220	-
Non-cultivable	6	-	146

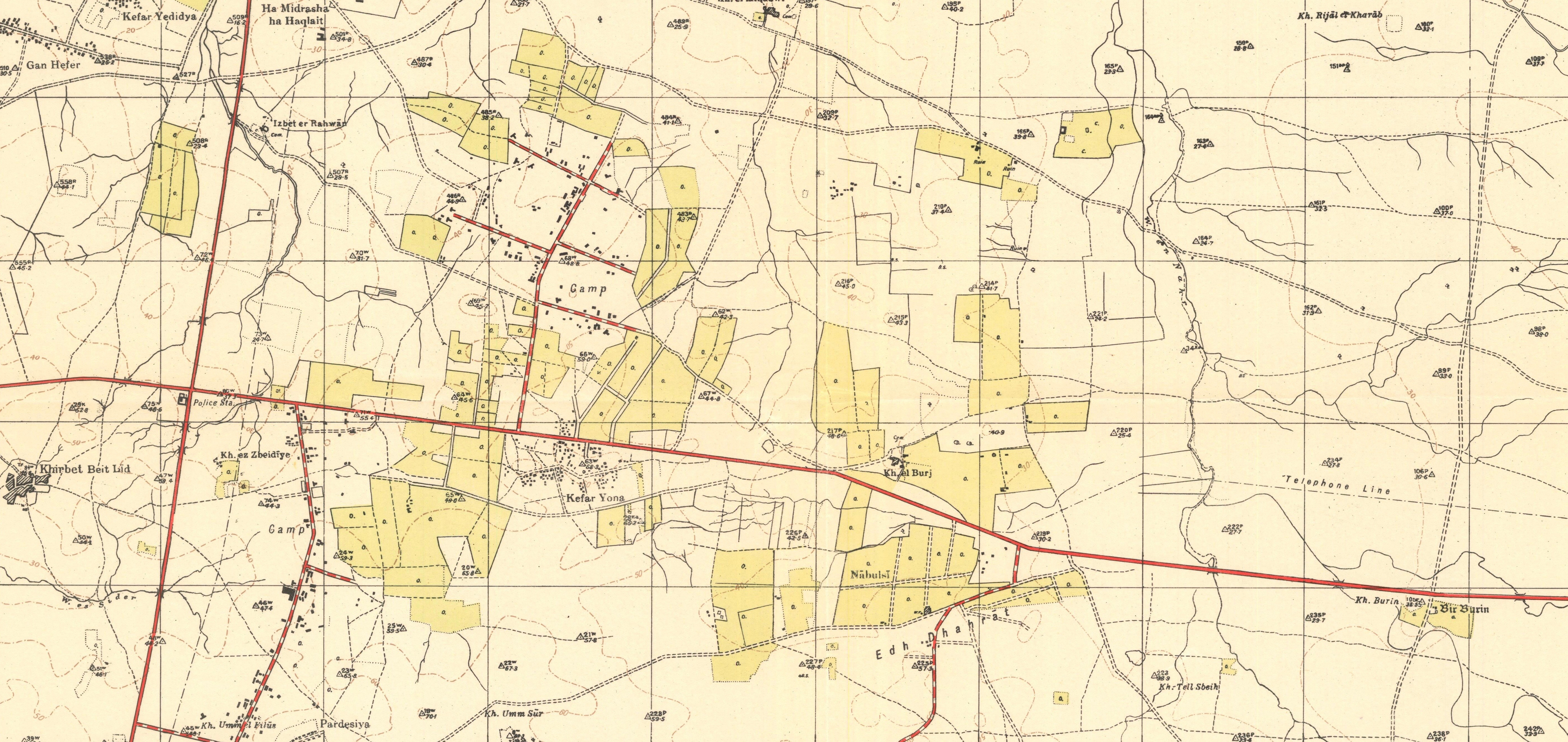
Khirbat Bayt Lid (Khirbet Beit Lid) 1939 1:20,000

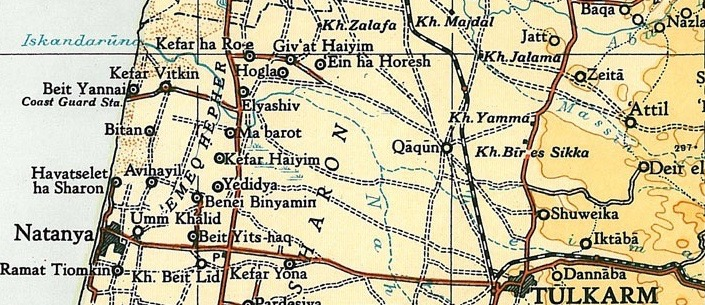
Khirbat Bayt Lid (Kh. Beit Lid) 1945 1:250,000

=== 1948, aftermath ===
In early 1948 the villagers grew fearful over news about fighting, and left for Beit Lid, where they had relatives, believing that they would return in some weeks. According to one villager, Husni 'Abd al-Latif 'Atawat; "They left all their belongings in Khirbat Bayt Lid. The Jews occupied it, and they could not return."

The Moshav Nordia was established on village land in August 1948, while Ganot Hadar is situated 500 meter northeast of the village site, but not on village land.

== Bibliography ==
- Barron, J. B., ed. (1923). Palestine: Report and General Abstracts of the Census of 1922. Government of Palestine.
- Conder, C.R.; Kitchener, H.H. (1882). The Survey of Western Palestine: Memoirs of the Topography, Orography, Hydrography, and Archaeology. Vol. 2. London: Committee of the Palestine Exploration Fund.
- Department of Statistics (1945). Village Statistics, April, 1945. Government of Palestine.
- Esber, R.M. (2008). Under the Cover of War, The Zionist Expulsions of the Palestinians. Arabicus Books & Media. ISBN 978-0981513171.
- Hadawi, S. (1970). Village Statistics of 1945: A Classification of Land and Area ownership in Palestine. Palestine Liberation Organization Research Center.
- Khalidi, W. (1992). All That Remains: The Palestinian Villages Occupied and Depopulated by Israel in 1948. Washington D.C.: Institute for Palestine Studies. ISBN 0-88728-224-5.
- Mills, E., ed. (1932). Census of Palestine 1931. Population of Villages, Towns and Administrative Areas. Jerusalem: Government of Palestine.
- Morris, B. (2004). The Birth of the Palestinian Refugee Problem Revisited. Cambridge University Press. ISBN 978-0-521-00967-6.
- Palmer, E.H. (1881). The Survey of Western Palestine: Arabic and English Name Lists Collected During the Survey by Lieutenants Conder and Kitchener, R. E. Transliterated and Explained by E.H. Palmer. Committee of the Palestine Exploration Fund.
