= Integrated Defense Systems =

Integrated Defense Systems may refer to:

- Boeing Integrated Defense Systems, the former name of Boeing Defense, Space & Security
- Raytheon Integrated Defense Systems, a subsidiary of Raytheon Company
