= Georgensgmünd–Spalt railway =

Former railway line in Germany

Georgensgmünd–Spalt

Overview
- Line number: 5945

Service
- Route number: ex 413k

Technical
- Line length: 6.9 km (4.3 mi)
- Track gauge: 1,435 mm (4 ft 8 1/2 in)

The Georgensgmünd–Spalt railway was opened on 16 October 1872 by the Royal Bavarian State Railways as a branch of the Nuremberg–Augsburg main line, after earlier plans to route the Ludwig South-North Railway from Lindau to Nuremberg via Gunzenhausen, Spalt and Georgensgemünd did not come to fruition. It was the second of the new category of light branch line, the so-called Vizinalbahnen, to be built. The hop farmers of Spalt would initially oppose this due to fears about the steam locomotives affecting the quality of their world-famous hops. Later, however, when the railway had established itself as a means of transportation, the town of Spalt tried several times to have a connexion built to the railway at Georgensgemünd, but eventually had to pay 80,000 gulden for the line as required by the Vizinalbahn law.

== Construction ==
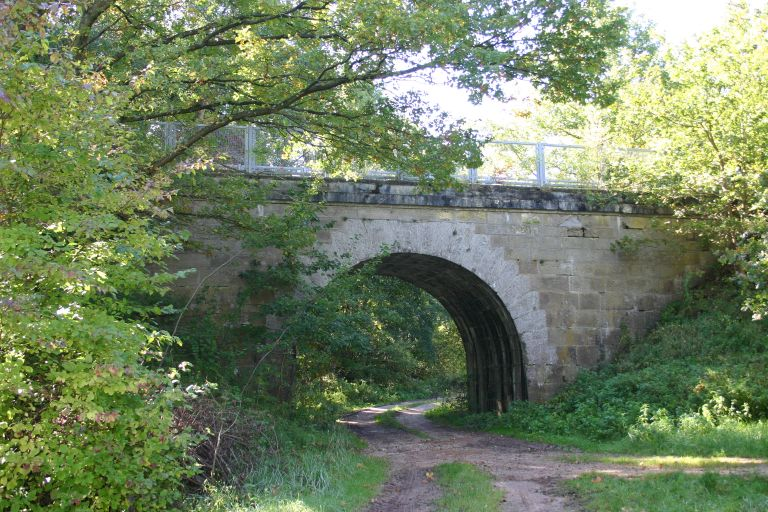
Bridge at Spalt, today a cycle path

Between 1870 and 1872, Schmidt, a construction engineer from the Nuremberg Railway Construction Section, came up with a total of four possible routes, the first one eventually being selected. In comparison with the others this was the shortest route and the one that required the least structural work; thus it was also the most cost-effective. The town of Spalt also took measures to reduce the cost; for example, the 14 structures (bridges and culverts) were built of stone that came from demolishing the town walls. Almost three quarters of the route consisted of straight line and only six curves were needed. The smallest curve radius was 750 metres and the shortest distance between two opposing curves was 188.50 metres. The formation of the trackbed comprised natural loam and sand, only a short section had to cross marsh and was carried on a sand bed. Cuttings up to 3 metres deep in places were dug out and embankments up to 8.5 metres high were built up using sand and loam again. A total of about 120,000 cubic metres of earth was moved.

The rails, points and crossing were made of cast steel delivered by the firm of Späth from Nuremberg, two different profiles being used. Kilometre stones were made by a local stonemason for 50 kreuzer a piece, including delivery.

== Operation ==
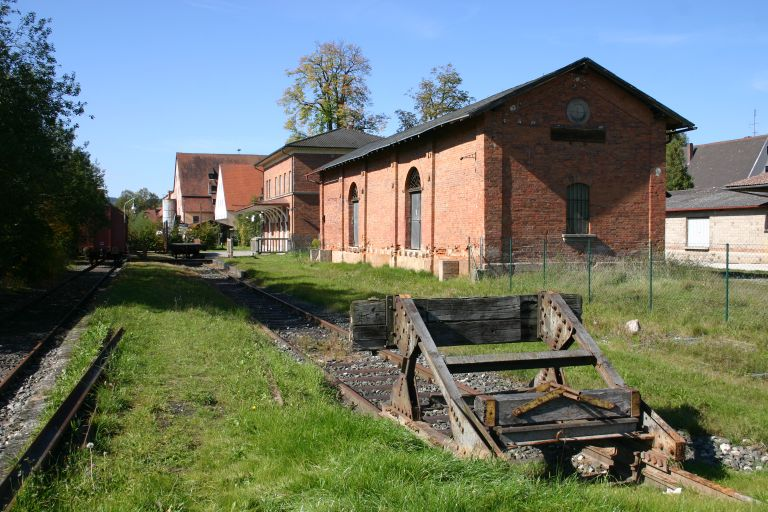
Spalt station yard in 2007

The first train arrived at Spalt on 18 September 1872 and services on the Spalter Bockl ("Spalt goat") as it was called locally, began on 16 October. Initially 3 pairs of trains ran daily; this was expanded during its final years to another 2 or 3 pairs. The halts at Wasserzell and Hügelmühle were built in 1892 and 1897 and trains called at them until 1922 and 1924 respectively. Following their closure, the halt at Großweingarten was built as a replacement.

In 1914, in order to provide a more economic service, it was planned to extend the railway to Windsbach and the route was marked out accordingly. However the outbreak of World War I delayed any work on the line and the plan was not carried through by the Deutsche Reichsbahn.

Like the other Vizinalbahnen services were initially hauled by old main line locomotives. After several less successful experiments with special branch line locomotives, in 1905 the first Glaskasten ("glass box") of Class PtL 2/2 entered service. This unusual, but classic, Bavarian branch line engine was to dominate the scene along the railway for decades to come. Its era did not end until 1963 with the retirement of no. 98 307, and they ran between Spalt and Georgensgmünd right to the end. The operational hub for the route was Spalt station. Locomotives were stabled for the night in the two-road locomotive shed by the exit towards Georgensgmünd.

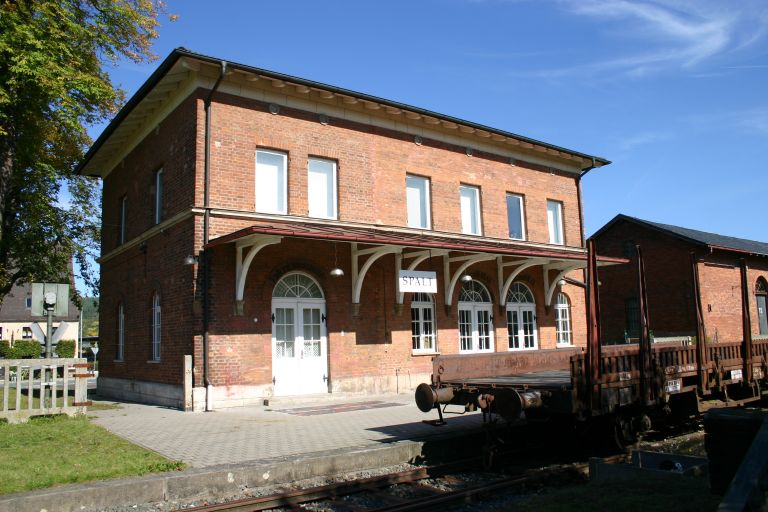
Spalt station in 2007

On 28 September 1969 passenger services on the 6.9 kilometre long route were withdrawn by the Deutsche Bundesbahn even though the line had been fully renovated in 1963. Goods traffic continued to run until 28 May 1995. The line was also worked occasionally by specials, especially from the DB-operated construction rubble dump, in which inter alia old ballast and the debris from dismantled platforms was dumped.

Since then the railway has been converted to a footpath and cycle way.

The station in the town of Spalt was restored and is nowadays a Kulturbahnhof ("cultural station") at the centre of cultural life in the town.

The old "Spalt Goat" (Spalter Bockl) can be viewed in the German Steam Locomotive Museum at Neuenmarkt (Upper Franconia) in Bavaria.

== Sources ==
- Bleiweis, Wolfgang / Martin, Ekkehard: Fränkische Nebenbahnen - Mittel- and Unterfranken, Egglham 1986/87?
- Heimatverein Spalter Land: Aus dem Spalter Land, Heimatkundliche Hefte. Reihe. Ausgabe 11, 1972
