= Beit Lid =

- Municipality type C

Arabic transcription(s)
  - Arabic: بيت ليد
  - Latin: Bayt Lid (official); Bayt Leed (unofficial)
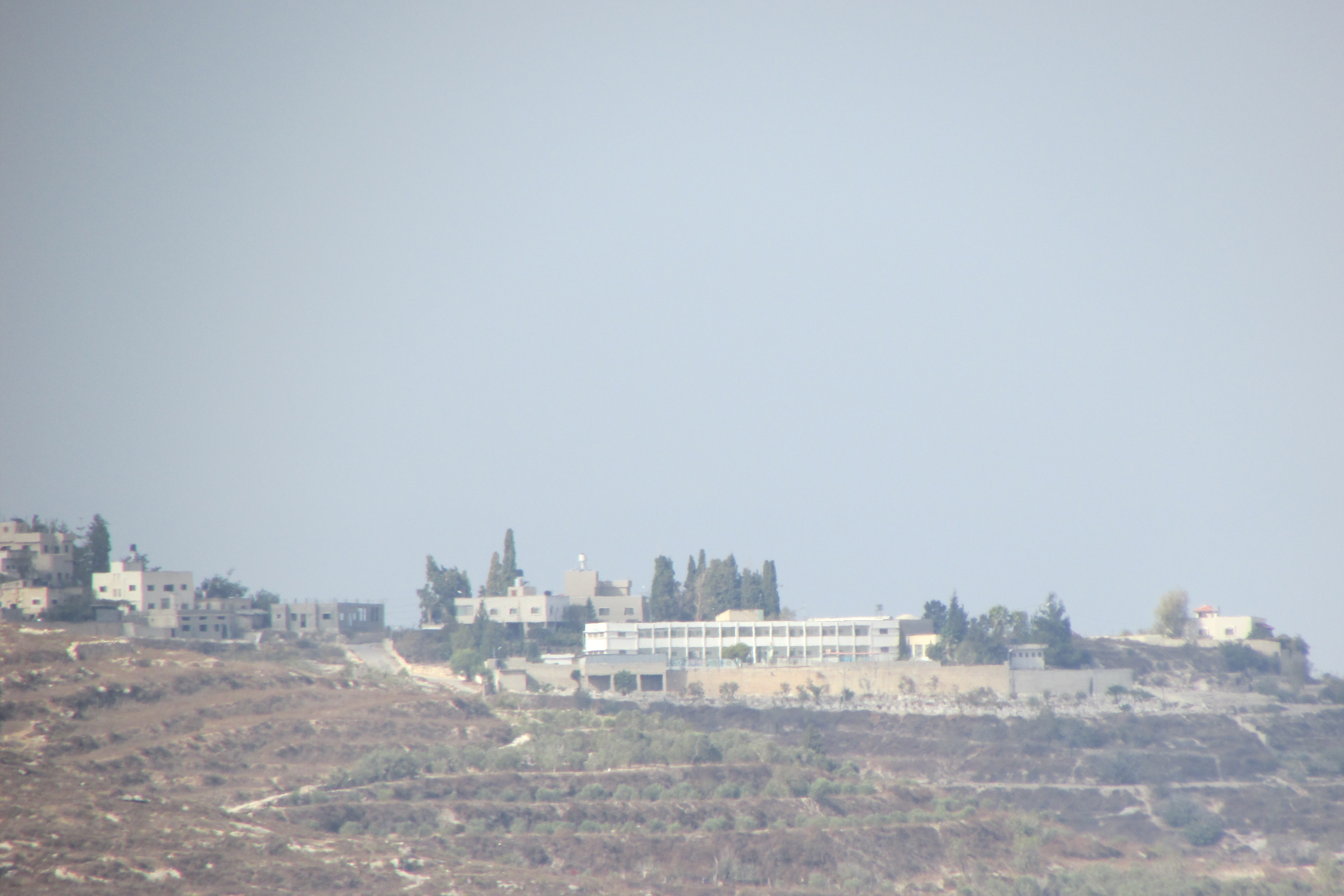
- School in Beit Lid

- Location of Beit Lid within Palestine
- Coordinates: 32°15′40″N 35°07′48″E
- Palestine grid: 162/185
- State: State of Palestine
- Governorate: Tulkarm

Government
  - Type: Municipality

Area
  - Total: 16.8 km^{2} (6.5 sq mi)

Population (2017)
  - Total: 5,606
  - Density: 334/km^{2} (864/sq mi)
- Name meaning: The house of Lid

Beit Lid (Arabic: بيت ليد) is a Palestinian town in the Tulkarm Governorate in the northeastern West Bank, located a 10 kilometers southeast of Tulkarm and west of Nablus. According to the Palestinian Central Bureau of Statistics, the town had a population of 5,606 inhabitants in 2017. In 1922, it had 653 inhabitants, which rose to 1,807 in 1961.

== History ==
Byzantine ceramics have been found here.

The village mosque has a large gate with a triple arch. An inscription over the lintel is a construction text, commemorating the building of the mosque. It dates from the late Mamluk, or early Ottoman period.

=== Ottoman era ===
Beit Lid, like all of Palestine was incorporated into the Ottoman Empire in 1517. In the 1596 tax registers, it was part of the nahiya ("subdistrict") of Jabal Sami, part of the larger Sanjak of Nablus. It had a population of 64 households, all Muslims. The inhabitants paid a fixed tax rate of 33,3% on agricultural products, including wheat, barley, summer crops, olive trees, goats and beehives, in addition to occasional revenues and a press for olive oil or grape syrup; a total of 17,310 akçe. Half of the revenues went to a Waqf.

In 1838, Edward Robinson passed it in the distance, and placed it in the Wady esh-Sha'ir administrative region, west of Nablus. In 1863 Victor Guérin noted it as a considerable village which occupied the top of a high hill; containing a thousand inhabitants. The houses were crudely built.

In the 1860s, the Ottoman authorities granted the village an agricultural plot of land called Ghabat Beit Lid in the former confines of the Forest of Arsur (Ar. Al-Ghaba) in the coastal plain, west of the village. This formed the foundation for the village of Khirbat Bayt Lid, founded by some Beit Lid's residents.

In 1870/1871 (1288 AH), an Ottoman census listed the village in the nahiya (sub-district) of Wadi al-Sha'ir.

In 1882, the PEF's Survey of Western Palestine (SWP) described Beit Lid as “A village of small size, built on a hill rising 600 feet above the valley south of it. The houses are of stone, and supplied by a well on the south-east, lower down. A few olives grow round the village.”

=== British Mandate era ===
In the 1922 census of Palestine conducted by the British Mandate authorities, Beit Lid's population was 653, all Muslims, increasing in the 1931 census to 738 residents, still all Muslim, in a total of 171 houses.

In the 1945 statistics the population of Beit Lid was 960 Muslims, and the land area was 16,752 dunams, according to an official land and population survey. 1,044 dunams were for citrus and bananas, 3,264 dunams were plantations and irrigable land, 4,473 used for cereals, while 22 dunams were built-up (urban) land.

=== 1948-1967 ===
In the wake of the 1948 Arab–Israeli War, and after the 1949 Armistice Agreements, Beit Lid came under Jordanian rule.

In 1961, the population of Beit Lid was 1,807.

=== Post-1967 ===
After the Six-Day War in 1967, Beit Lid has been under Israeli occupation.

Agriculture is a major economic sector in Beit Lid, with olives, almonds, figs, grapes and grains being the primary crops grown on 16,753 dunams. Until recently, agriculture employed most of the working males of the town, however, many residents are employed in small business professions, such as construction, blacksmithing and electricity. Many in Beit Lid that worked inside Israel, have been unemployed since the Second Intifada and the difficult conditions surrounding it.

There are four schools (two primary and two secondary), four kindergartens, a clinic operated by the Palestinian National Authority and founded in 1964. Beit Lid contains four mosques, including Masjid al-Qadim, Masjid Fatima Zahra, Masjid as-Salaam and Masjid Salah ad-Din.

== See also ==
- Beit Lid suicide bombing (January 1995)

== Bibliography ==
- Barron, J.B., ed. (1923). Palestine: Report and General Abstracts of the Census of 1922. Government of Palestine.
- Conder, C.R.; Kitchener, H.H. (1882). The Survey of Western Palestine: Memoirs of the Topography, Orography, Hydrography, and Archaeology. Vol. 2. London: Committee of the Palestine Exploration Fund.
- Dauphin, C. (1998). La Palestine byzantine, Peuplement et Populations. BAR International Series 726 (in French). Vol. III : Catalogue. Oxford: Archeopress. ISBN 0-860549-05-4.
- Government of Jordan, Department of Statistics (1964). First Census of Population and Housing. Volume I: Final Tables; General Characteristics of the Population (PDF).
- Government of Palestine, Department of Statistics (1945). Village Statistics, April, 1945.
- Guérin, V. (1875). Description Géographique Historique et Archéologique de la Palestine (in French). Vol. 2: Samarie, pt. 2. Paris: L'Imprimerie Nationale.
- Hadawi, S. (1970). Village Statistics of 1945: A Classification of Land and Area ownership in Palestine. Palestine Liberation Organization Research Center.
- Hütteroth, W.-D.; Abdulfattah, K. (1977). Historical Geography of Palestine, Transjordan and Southern Syria in the Late 16th Century. Erlanger Geographische Arbeiten, Sonderband 5. Erlangen, Germany: Vorstand der Fränkischen Geographischen Gesellschaft. ISBN 3-920405-41-2.
- Mills, E., ed. (1932). Census of Palestine 1931. Population of Villages, Towns and Administrative Areas. Jerusalem: Government of Palestine.
- Palmer, E.H. (1881). The Survey of Western Palestine: Arabic and English Name Lists Collected During the Survey by Lieutenants Conder and Kitchener, R. E. Transliterated and Explained by E.H. Palmer. Committee of the Palestine Exploration Fund.
- Robinson, E.; Smith, E. (1841). Biblical Researches in Palestine, Mount Sinai and Arabia Petraea: A Journal of Travels in the year 1838. Vol. 3. Boston: Crocker & Brewster.
- Sharon, M. (1999). Corpus Inscriptionum Arabicarum Palaestinae, B-C. Vol. 2. BRILL. ISBN 90-04-11083-6.
