= IID (disambiguation) =

IID may refer to:

- Interface Identifier, the last 64-bits of an IPv6 address
- Internet identity, a social identity used by Internet users
- Internet Identity, an Internet security company
- Ignition interlock device, a breathalyzer connected to a vehicle's engine
- Independent and identically distributed random variables in probability theory
- Interaural intensity difference in determining the location of a sound
- Internal Investigations Division (in law enforcement)
- IRIX Interactive Desktop, software for interacting with a computer running the IRIX operating system
- Iterative and Incremental Development in software development
- A COM Interface ID
- Invoke Image Display an Integrating the Healthcare Enterprise (IHE) Integration Profile
- Imperial Irrigation District
- Imperial Institute of Design, a design school in Monteswar, West Bengal, India

== See also ==
- 2D (disambiguation), including a list of topics named II-D, etc.
