= Olav Lid =

Norwegian jurist

Olav Lid (1908–1998) was a Norwegian jurist.

He was born in Kviteseid Municipality. He was a programme secretary and chief secretary in the Norwegian Broadcasting Corporation between 1945 and 1957. In 1961 he took the dr.juris degree with the thesis Tomtefeste, and was appointed professor of jurisprudence at the Norwegian College of Agriculture in the same year. He retired in 1978. Lid also chaired the board of the Norwegian National Opera from its inception in 1957 to 1969.
