= Bavarian D II =

Bavarian D II DRG Class 89.6
Type and origin
- Builder: Krauss (38); Maffei (35)
- Build date: 1898–1904
- Total produced: 73
Specifications
- Configuration
  - Whyte: 0-6-0T
  - German: Gt 33.15
- Gauge: 1,435 mm (4 ft 8 1/2 in)
- Driver dia.: 1,216 mm (3 ft 11 7/8 in)
- Length
  - Over beams: 9,408 mm (30 ft 10 1/2 in)
- Axle load: 15.1 t (14.9 long tons; 16.6 short tons)
- Adhesive weight: 44.8 t (44.1 long tons; 49.4 short tons)
- Service weight: 44.8 t (44.1 long tons; 49.4 short tons)
- Boiler pressure: 12 kgf/cm^{2} (1,180 kPa; 171 lbf/in^{2})
- Heating surface
  - Firebox: 1.61 m^{2} (17.3 sq ft)
  - Evaporative: 89.60 m^{2} (964.4 sq ft)
- Cylinders: 2
- Cylinder size: 420 mm (16 9/16 in)
- Piston stroke: 610 mm (24 in)
Performance figures
- Maximum speed: 45 km/h (28 mph)
- Indicated power: 430 PS (316 kW; 424 hp)
Career
- Numbers: K.Bay.Sts.E.: 2400–2472; DRG: 89 601 – 89 670
- Retired: 1960

The newer Class D II engines of the Royal Bavarian State Railways (Königlich Bayerische Staatsbahn) were goods train tank locomotives. The designation 'D II' was given to these locomotives only after all the older Class D II engines had been mustered out. Of the 73 engines that were built, 70 entered the Deutsche Reichsbahn as Class 89.6; the remaining 3 transferred to the Polish State Railways (PKP) in 1919 as Class TKh101. The majority were still working even after the Second World War. The last one was not taken out of service until 1960.

== See also ==
- Royal Bavarian State Railways
- List of Bavarian locomotives and railbuses
