= Pennsylvania Railroad class D2 =

PRR D2 & D2a
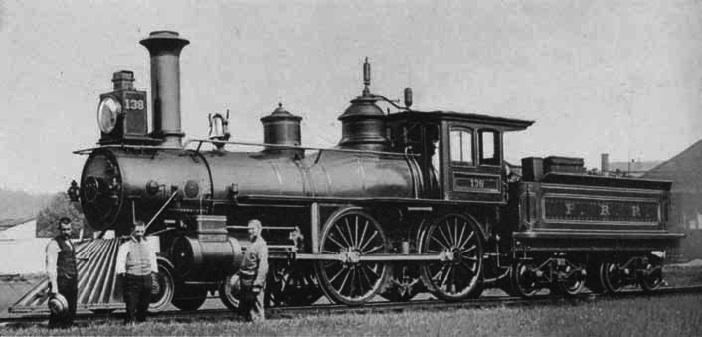
- Class B A #138 (later class D2a)
Type and origin
- Power type: Steam
- Builder: PRR Altoona Works
- Build date: 1868–1872 (D2); 1881–1882 (D2a)
- Total produced: 20 (D2); 45 (D2a)
Specifications
- Configuration
  - Whyte: 4-4-0
  - UIC: 2′B
- Gauge: 4 ft 8 1/2 in (1,435 mm)
- Leading dia.: 28 in (711 mm) (D2); 30 in (762 mm) (D2a)
- Driver dia.: 62 in (1,575 mm) (D2); 68 in (1,727 mm) (D2a)
- Wheelbase: 22 ft 5 5/8 in (6.85 m)
- Length: 54 ft 5.44 in (16.60 m)
- Width: 9 ft 0.94 in (2.77 m)
- Height: 14 ft 8 in (4.47 m) (D2); 14 ft 11 in (4.55 m) (D2a)
- Adhesive weight: 52,500 lb (23.8 tonnes) (D2); 53,750 lb (24.4 tonnes) (D2a)
- Loco weight: 80,500 lb (36.5 tonnes) (D2); 82,200 lb (37.3 tonnes) (D2a)
- Tender weight: 51,400 lb (23.3 tonnes) (D2 & D2a)
- Total weight: 131,900 lb (59.8 tonnes) (D2); 133,600 lb (60.6 tonnes)
- Tender type: Eight-wheel with water scoop
- Fuel type: Soft coal
- Fuel capacity: 8,000 lb (3.6 tonnes)
- Water cap.: 2,400 US gal (9,100 L; 2,000 imp gal)

The Pennsylvania Railroad's steam locomotive class D2 (formerly Class B, pre-1895) comprised twenty 4-4-0 locomotives intended for mountain passenger helper service, constructed at the railroad's own Altoona Works (now owned by Norfolk Southern) during 1869–1880. They were the second standardized class of locomotives on the railroad and shared many parts with other standard classes.

This design differed from the Class A (later D1) mainly in its smaller drivers for greater tractive effort in mountainous terrain. Like all the early standardized 4-4-0s on the PRR, the Class B had a wagon-top boiler with steam dome and a firebox between the two driving axles.

In 1881, the PRR took the Class B design and modified it to produce more locomotives for express passenger service, with 68-inch (1,727 mm) drivers like the earlier Class A. These new locomotives were designated Class B A, and were classified as D2a in the post-1895 scheme; forty-five of them were constructed.
