= Zhidou D2 =

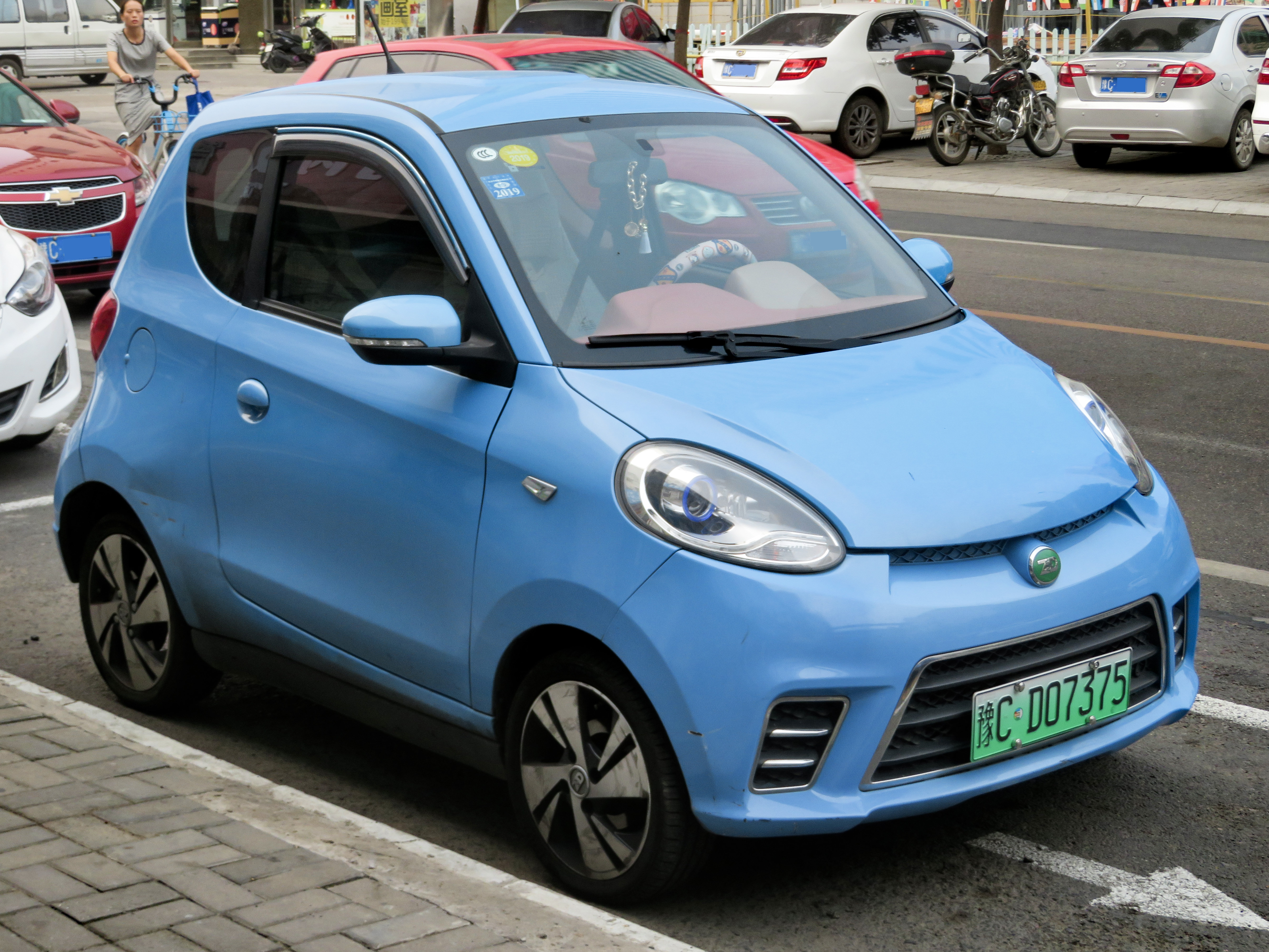

Overview
- Manufacturer: Zhidou Auto
- Also called: Zhidou D1; Zotye E20; Semisysco D2 (South Korea); Elaris Pio (Germany)
- Production: 2014–2020
- Assembly: China; South Korea: Sejong City (Semisysco)

Body and chassis
- Class: Microcar
- Body style: 3-door hatchback

Dimensions
- Wheelbase: 1,765 mm (69.5 in)
- Length: 2,765 mm (108.9 in)
- Width: 1,540 mm (60.6 in)
- Height: 1,555 mm (61.2 in)
- Kerb weight: 690 kg (1,521 lb) (Zhidou D2); 670 kg (1,477 lb) (Zotye E20)

The Zhidou D2 is an all-electric car that is manufactured by the Chinese manufacturer Zhi Dou Electric Vehicle Corporation—sometimes called Zhidou Auto or ZD Auto. They were also used by car sharing company Sharengo in Milan and other Italian cities from 2013 to 2020.

== History ==
Originally launched simply as the Zhidou, and later Zhidou D1 and D2. The Zhidou D2, which went on the market in June 2015, is an improved and updated version of the same car featuring updated styling and performance.

Replacing the Zhidou D1 in 2015, the D2 has a 47 kW motor and a 210AH lithium-ion battery pack that delivers a range of 120 km (75 mi).

Charging for the Zhidou D2 takes 8 to 10 hours for a full charge on 220V power source.

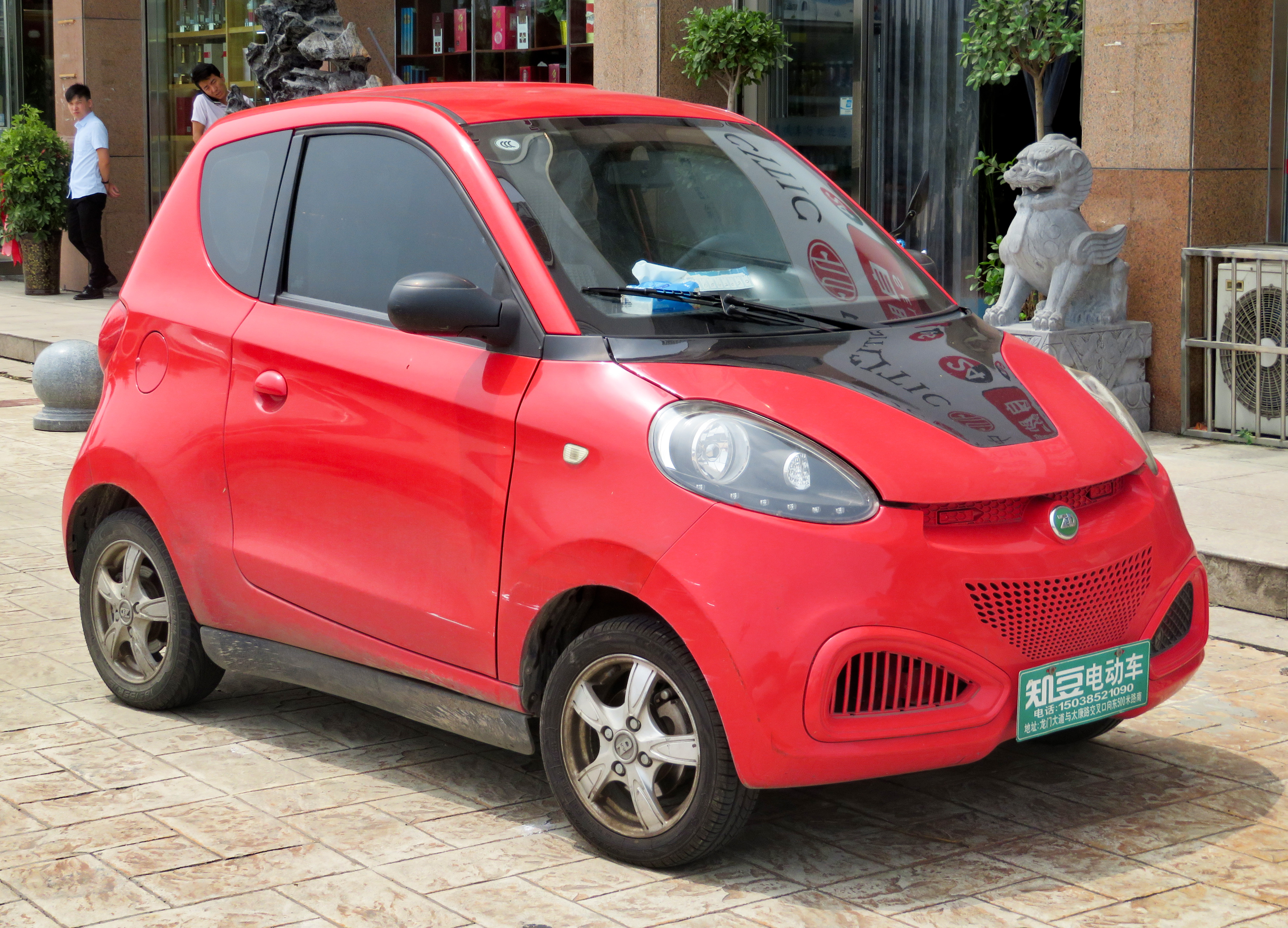
Zhidou D1 (front)

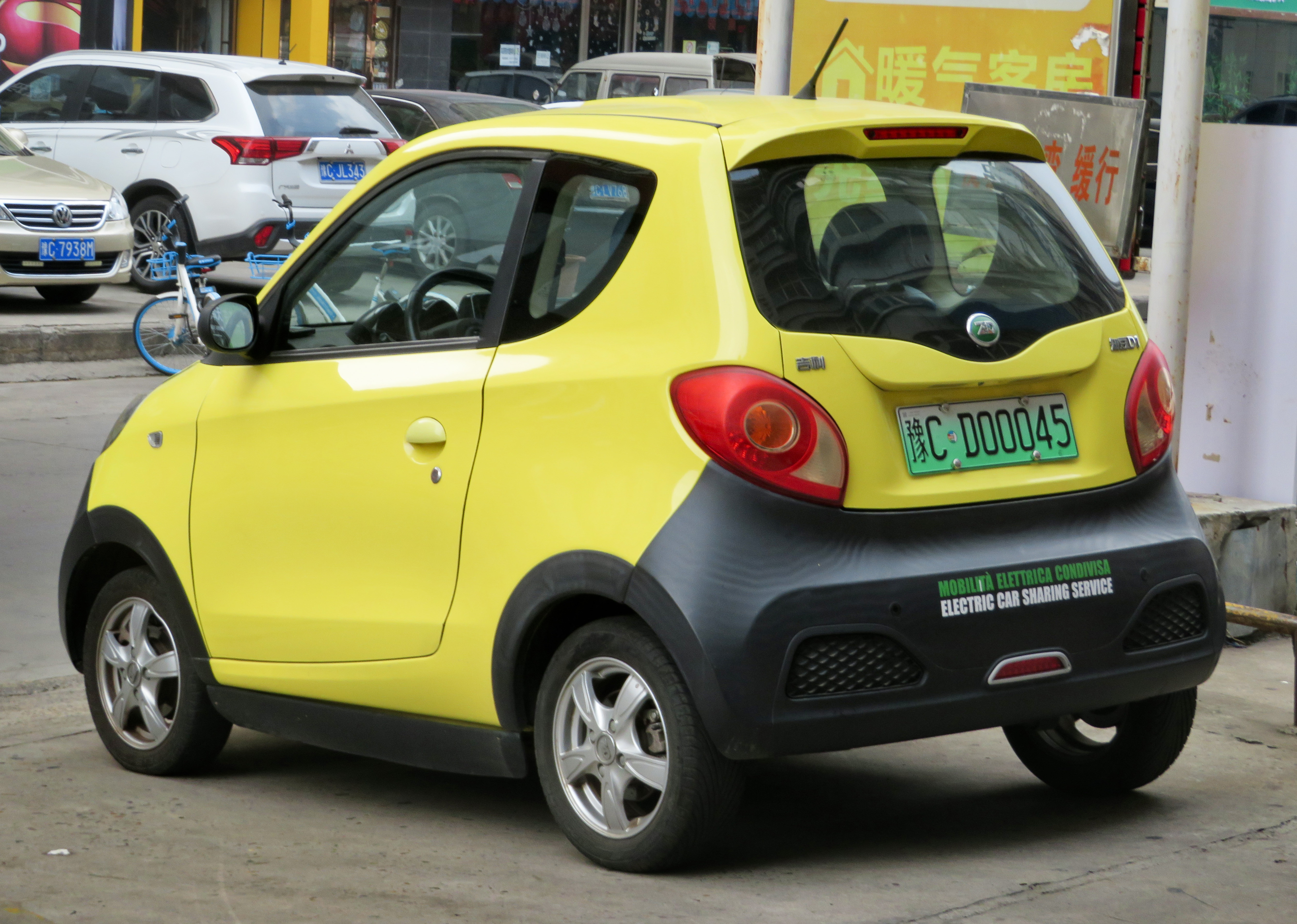
Zhidou D1 (rear)

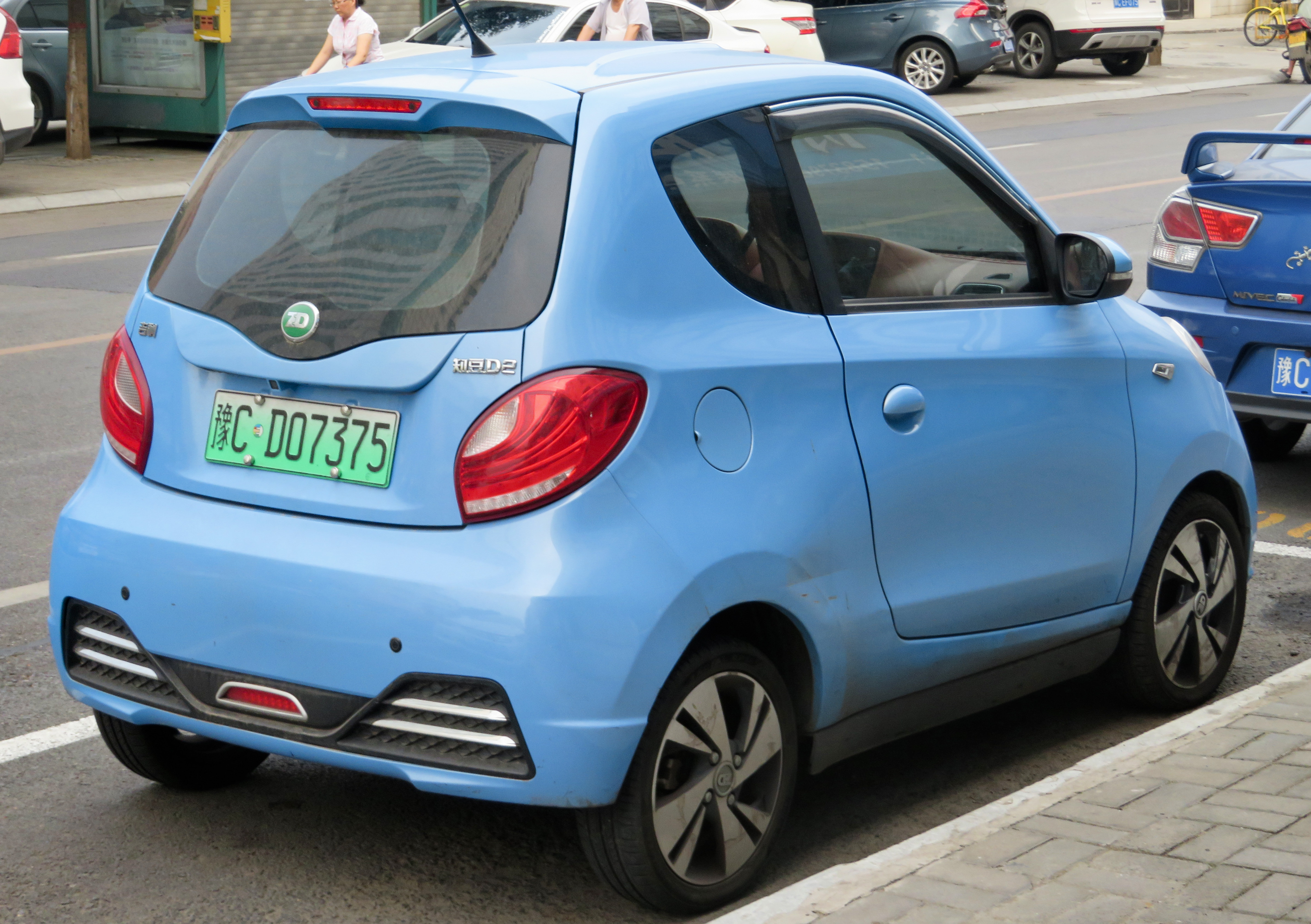
Zhidou D2 (rear)

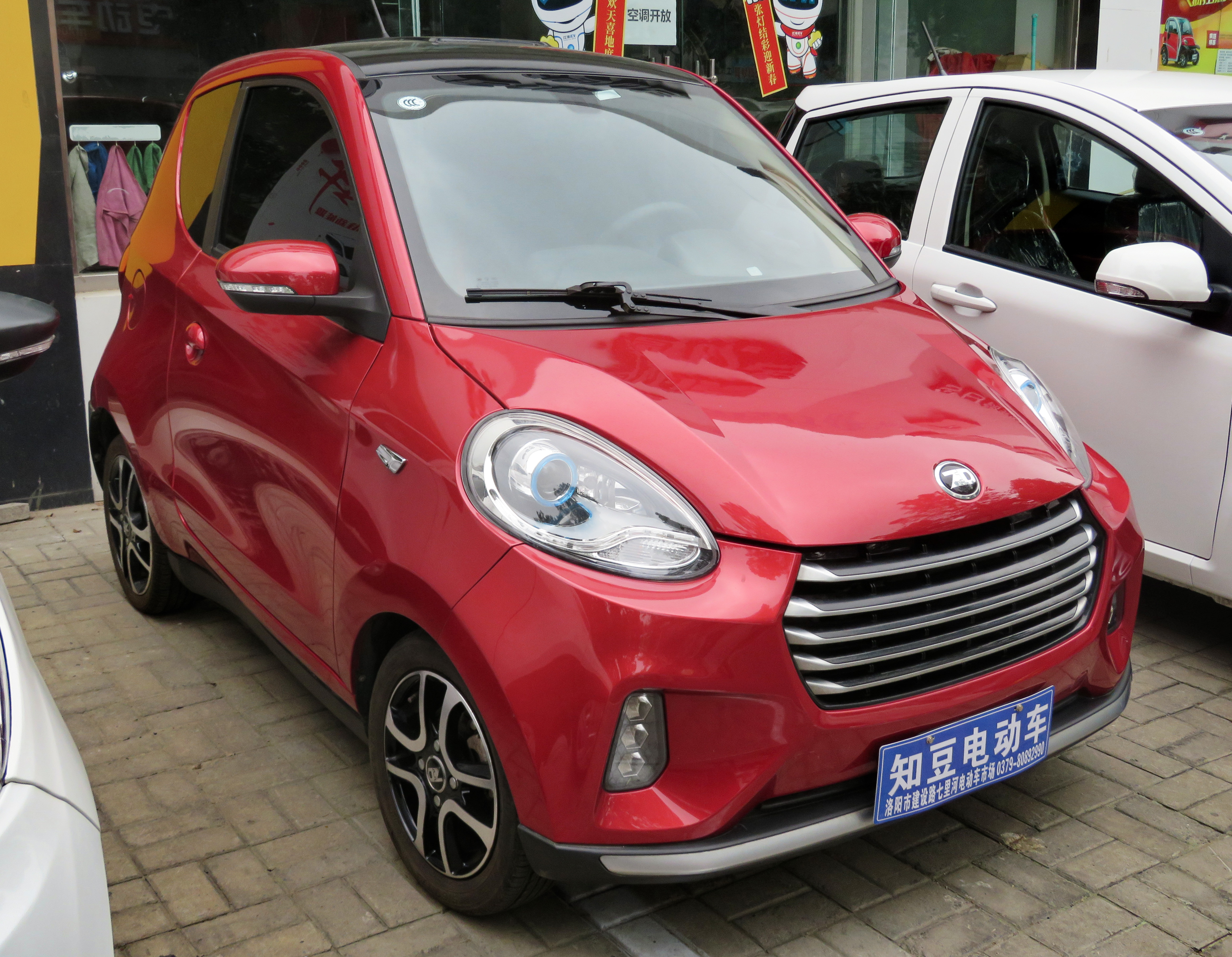
Zhidou D2S (2018)

== Zotye E20 ==
The Zotye E20 is a variant of the D2 that Zhidou makes for Zotye Automotive. The Zotye E20 was originally unveiled as a pre-production concept car during the 2014 Beijing Auto Show in April 2014, at a price of 108,800 yuan ($17,700) without subsidies.

The Zotye E20 is powered by an electric motor producing 24 hp (18 kW) and 82 N⋅m (60 lbf⋅ft) of torque. The top speed of the Zotye E20 is 80 km/h (50 mph), and the electric range of the E20 is 120 km (75 mi).

Charging for the Zotye E20 is six hours on a 220V power source for a full charge, and 20 minutes on a fast charger for an 80% charge.

Green energy subsidies from central and local government in China brings the price down to 48,800 yuan ($7,944), which is a total subsidy of 60,000 yuan ($9,760).
