= Gaokin =

Chinese motorcycle manufacturer

- Gaokin logo
- Trade name: Chongqing Gaokin Industry Co., Ltd.
- Native name: 重庆高金实业股份有限公司
- Industry: Transportation
- Founded: 2006; 20 years ago
- Headquarters: Chongqing, China
- Products: Motorcycles, engine
- Website: www.gaokin.com

Chongqing Gaokin Industry Co., Ltd. (traded as Gaokin) is a Chinese manufacturing company producing motorcycles, quad bikes and engines, based in Chongqing, China.

Gaokin products are exported from China through Keeway and the KSR Group, then rebranded under the Morbidelli and Brixton names.

== History ==
Gaokin was founded on 28 February 2006, in Chongqing, an industrial city in China known for hosting numerous automotive and motorcycle manufacturers. In 2007, the construction of the first plant for the production of cylinder blocks for diesel engines commissioned by Cummins for export to North America was completed. Additionally, the Chongqing research and development center was also completed, where a 600 cc twin-cylinder motorcycle engine was developed for third-party production.

In 2013, Gaokin began exporting motorcycle engines to European manufacturers, and the company was reorganized into four sectors, with motorcycle production being complemented by the production of components for large industrial engines. In 2014, it acquired the license to produce marine and industrial engines from Cummins and Caterpillar. Between 2018 and 2019, Gaokin developed a range of high-end motorcycles under its own brand, as well as engines ranging from 300 cc to 1200 cc. The design of the motorcycles was developed together with the Austrian KSR Group.

Additionally, numerous agreements were signed with European importers to market its motorcycles in Europe. In May 2020, the GK500 was introduced, the first motorcycle of the brand to be sold in Europe by the Austrian group KSR under the Brixton brand (rebadges as the Brixton Crossfire 500).

In July 2021, the 88th Caterpillar 3500 series engine block was produced. Subsequently, numerous motorcycle models were introduced and exported from 2022 not only by KSR (Brixton) but also by Keeway in the European and Asian market under the MBP brand. Since 2022, Gaokin has also been supplying 400 cm^{3} and 500 cm^{3} engines to Geely Ming Industrial for Jiming-branded motorcycles.

In 2022 the Gaokin Thor GK1000 cruiser was launched in China.

At Cima Motor 2023, Gaokin presents the GK650 Bobber prototype and the GK1000 ADV prototype, the brand's first adventure motorcycle with a 1.0 cm^{3} engine. This model will be subsequently exhibited at EICMA 2023 rebranded by Keeway as the MBP Morbidelli T1002V. The production version start in September 2024 with name changed in Gaokin Hawk 1000 ADV.

In 2024, the compact adventure motorcycle, Gaokin Storr 500 ADV, was launched in the Chinese market. In Europe was imported by Austrian group KSR and sold as the Brixton Storr 500.

== Models ==
=== In production ===
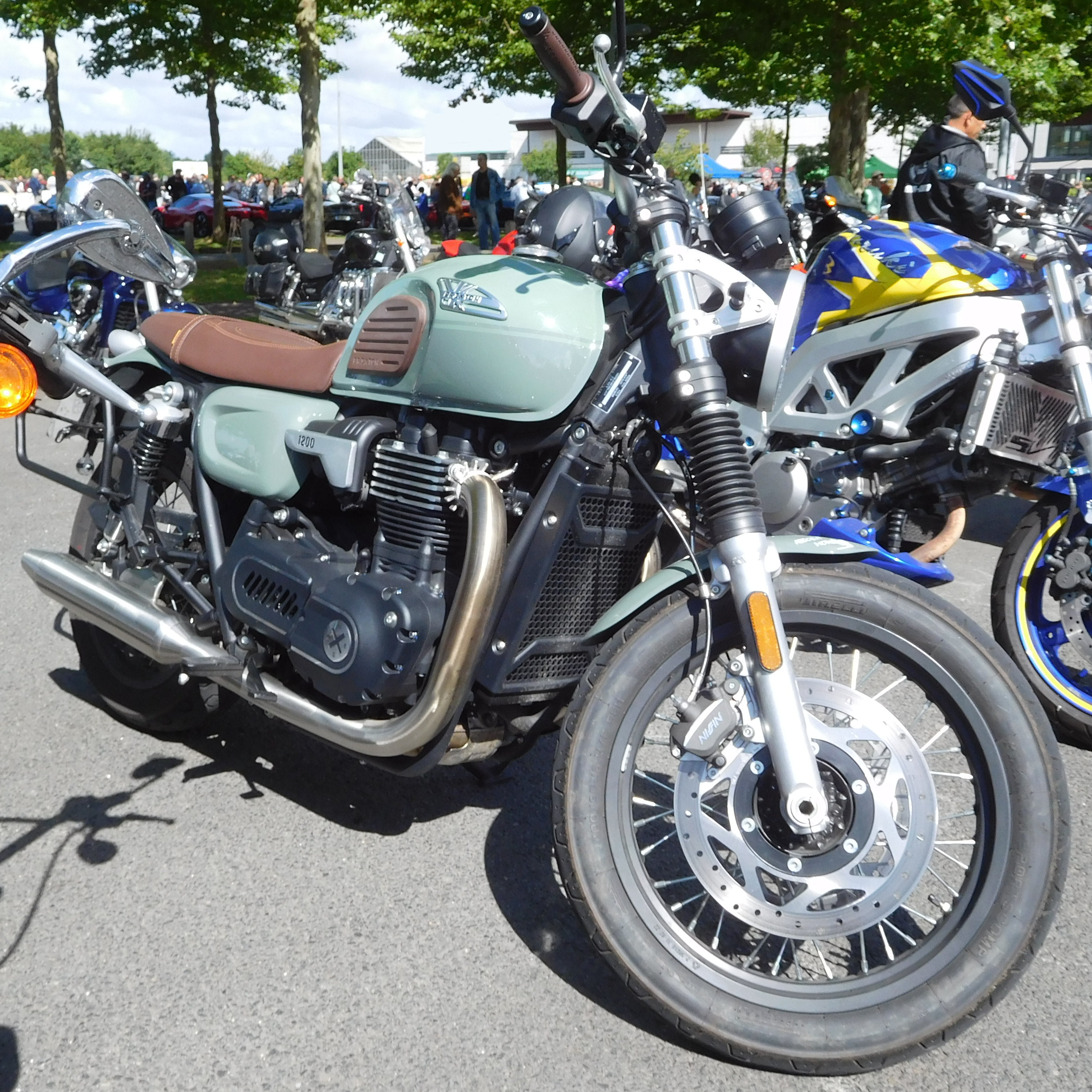
The Brixton Cromwell 1200 made by Gaokin

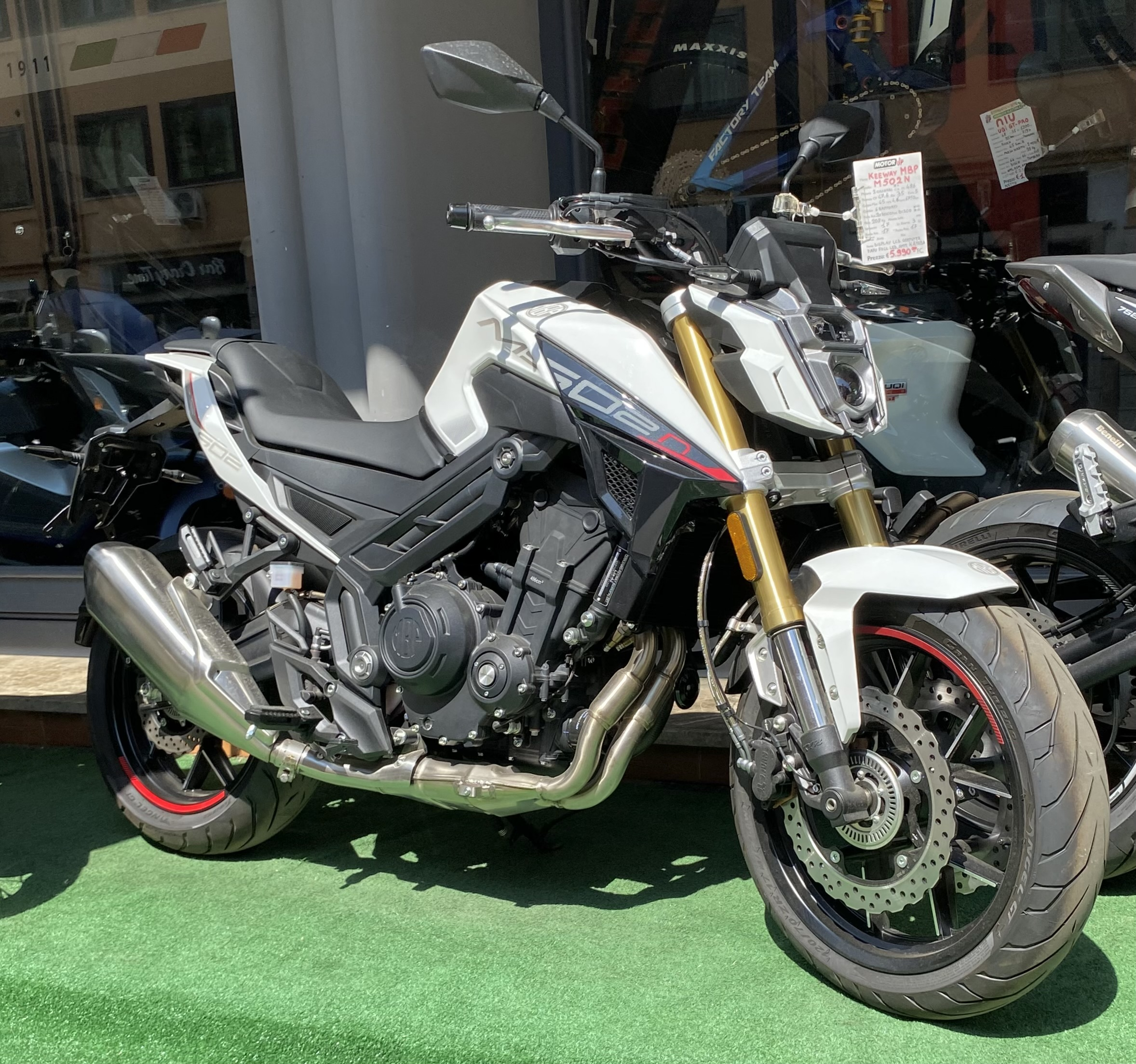
MBP M502N, sold in China as a Gaokin Flame 500

- Gaokin Flame 500 (model code GK500-2), also exported as MBP Morbidelli M502N by Keeway
- Gaokin GK 500, also exported as a Brixton Crossfire 500
- Gaokin GK 1200, also exported as Brixton Cromwell 1200
- Gaokin GK 1000 Thor also exported as MBP Morbidelli C1002V
- Gaokin GK400, 400cc version of the GK500
- Lambretta G350 (GK350T)
- Gaokin Hawk 1000 (called Gaokin GK1000 ADV in prototype version), model code GK1000GY, GK1000GY-A, GK1000GY-B, rebranded as a MBP Morbidelli T1002V in Europe.
- Gaokin Storr 500 (GK500-C), also exported as Brixton Storr 500

=== Planned ===
- Gaokin Thor GK650, model code GK650 Bobber.
