= Geely Ming Industrial =

Motorcycle manufacturer part of Geely Group

Zhejiang Geely Ming Industrial Co., Ltd.
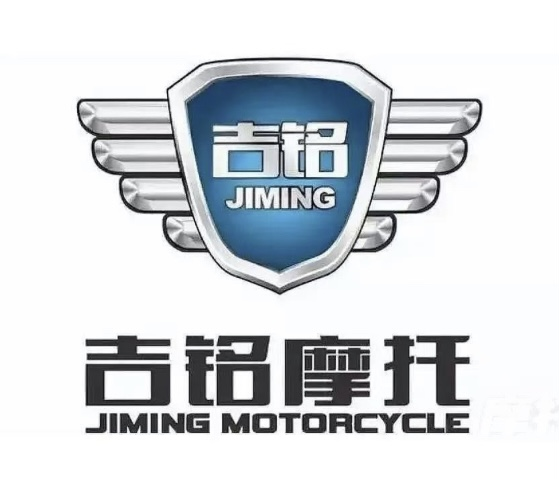
- Native name: 浙江吉铭实业有限公司
- Type: Subsidiary
- Industry: Personal transport manufacturer
- Founded: 1995; 31 years ago
- Founder: Li Shufu (Geely)
- Headquarters: Taizhou, Zhejiang, China
- Area served: China
- Products: Motorcycles, scooters
- Parent: Geely (100%)
- Website: geelymotor.cn

Geely Crusader 125 produced by Geely Ming

Zhejiang Geely Ming Industrial Co., Ltd. (Chinese: 浙江吉铭实业有限公司, common known as Geely Ming, or GM Motor) is a Chinese motorcycle manufacturer founded in 1995 with registered office in Zhejiang province. It is a subsidiary of Geely.

The vehicles are sold under two brands: Jiming (吉铭) and Geely Motorcycle.

== History ==
The production of the first Geely motorcycle dates back to 1994 when a new plant was inaugurated in Taizhou, China with a capacity of 50,000 vehicles per year.

On 8 April 1995 this business unit was spun off and the Geely Group Zhejiang Motorcycle Company was founded by Li Shufu, a subsidiary of Geely Holding Group specializing in the production of motorcycles, which in the nineties operated in the local market with the Jiming brand to avoid confusion with the Geely branded appliances.

Production was initially based on low cost mopeds, scooters and light motorcycles in the 50–250 cm^{3} range. Later, light motorcars and quadricycles are also introduced.

Between 1997 and 1998, exports to Southeast Asian countries and South America of the Geely rebranded motorcycles began.

In 2002, following the strong expansion of the parent company, Geely Ming expands its product range and its plant to reach a capacity of 300,000 vehicles per year and concentrating all production, painting and assembly operations. In addition, studies are launched for the production of electric scooters.

In 2013 it was officially renamed Geely Ming Industrial Company (abbreviated to GM Motor) and the Jiming brand is used to market motorcycles in the larger range of 250–400 cm^{3} while the Geely brand is also used in China on motorcycles and small-volume scooters.

In May 2018 Jiming presents three models: the 400S faired sports 400 cm^{3} (code JM400), the Thor 500 cm^{3} cruiser (code JM500) and the JM175ZD tricycle. The JM175ZD is a three-wheeled vehicle with scooter mechanics and powered by a 175 cm^{3} engine. Was also exported to the United States and Mexico rebadged Jasscol Spyder X200.

In 2021, the Jiming JM500, was introduced as the first motorcycles of the brand powered by the 500 cm^{3} twin-cylinder Gaokin engines.

In 2023, the Vasilica range of scooters was presented with a design inspired by the Piaggio Vespa 946 and sold in China with a 150 cm^{3} engine, while for export it is also available with a 125 cm^{3} engine. Also the Jiming X-Kub was presented, a moped powered by Zongshen 50, 100 and 125 cm^{3} and with design inspired by the Honda Cross Cub (CC110).

In 2024 the JM800 motorcycle was launched in the Chinese market; the 777 cm^{3} (VSKE469MW) four-cylinder engine was made by Wuyi Weisenke Power Technology.

== List of Geely motorcycles ==
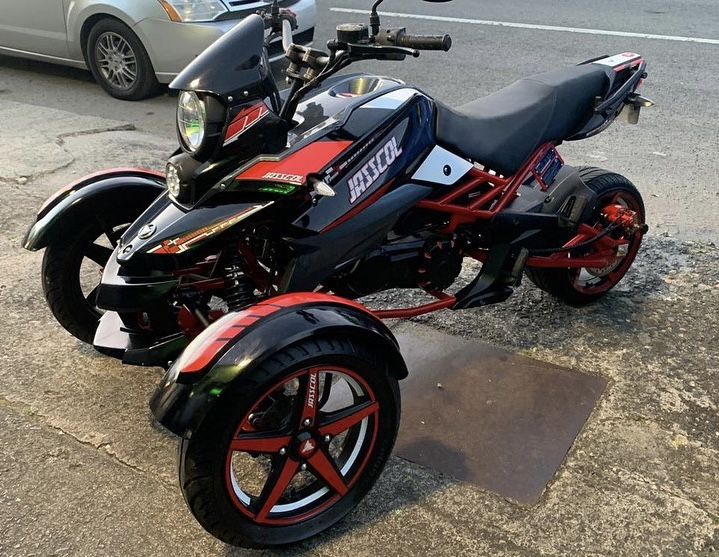
Jiming JM175ZD tricycle, sold in NAFTA as a Jasscol Spider X200

=== Scooters ===
- JL50QT — 49.5 cc 4-stroke air-cooled single
- JL70 — 71.8 cc 4-stroke air-cooled single
- JL100-5 and -6 — 98.2 cc 2-stroke air-cooled single, step-through
- JL100T — 98.2 cc 2-stroke air-cooled single
- JL110
- JL125T — 124 cc 4-stroke air-cooled single
- JL150T
- JL250T — 244.2 cc 4-stroke single
- JM150T-72 (Chinese name 吉虎 )
- JM150T-73 (Chinese name 阿图瓦 ZTX, English name Jiming ZTX 150)
- Vasilica (code JM125T-19A and JM125T-19B) introduced in 2022

=== Motorcycles ===
- JL100 — 98.2 cc 2-stroke air-cooled single
- JL125 — 124 cc 4-stroke air-cooled single
- JL150 — 4-stroke air-cooled single
- JL250 — 250 cc air-cooled 4-stroke parallel twin
- JM400 (also called Jiming 400S), 2018–2023
- JM500-1 (Chinese name 雷神, English name Jiming Thor), introduced in 2018
- JM500-2 (Chinese name 雷神, English name Jiming Thor), introduced in 2018
- JM500-7 (Chinese name G麒), introduced in 2021
- JM500-8 (Chinese name G麟), introduced in 2021
- JM500-9 (Chinese name 吉越SS), introduced in 2022
- JM800, introduced in 2024
- JM800S, introduced in 2024

=== Tricycle ===
- JM175ZD, also rebadged as a Jasscol Spyder X200 in NAFTA
- JM300ZD

== See also ==
- Qianjiang Motorcycle, another Chinese motorcycle manufacturer subsidiary of Geely Group.
