= Brixton (disambiguation) =

Brixton is an area of south London.

It gives its name to:

- Brixton (London County Council constituency), former constituency
- Brixton (UK Parliament constituency), former constituency
- Brixton Academy, a music venue
- Brixton House, a theatre
- Brixton Market, a street market
- Brixton motorcycles, an Austrian motorcycle manufacturer company
- Brixton murals, murals painted in the 1980s
- Brixton railway station, a national rail station
- Brixton tube station, a Victoria Line tube station
- HM Prison Brixton, the prison in the area
- Hundred of Brixton, an ancient county subdivision of Surrey

Brixton may also refer to:

== Places ==
- Brixton, Devon, England
- Brixton, Johannesburg, South Africa
- Brixton, New Plymouth, New Zealand
- Brixton Deverill, Wiltshire, England
- Brighstone, a village on the Isle of Wight, which used to be called Brixton

== Other uses ==
- Brixton (album), a 2018 album by British rapper Sneakbo
- Brixton plc, a defunct British industrial and commercial property business
