= Keeway RKF =

Motorcycle made by Keeway

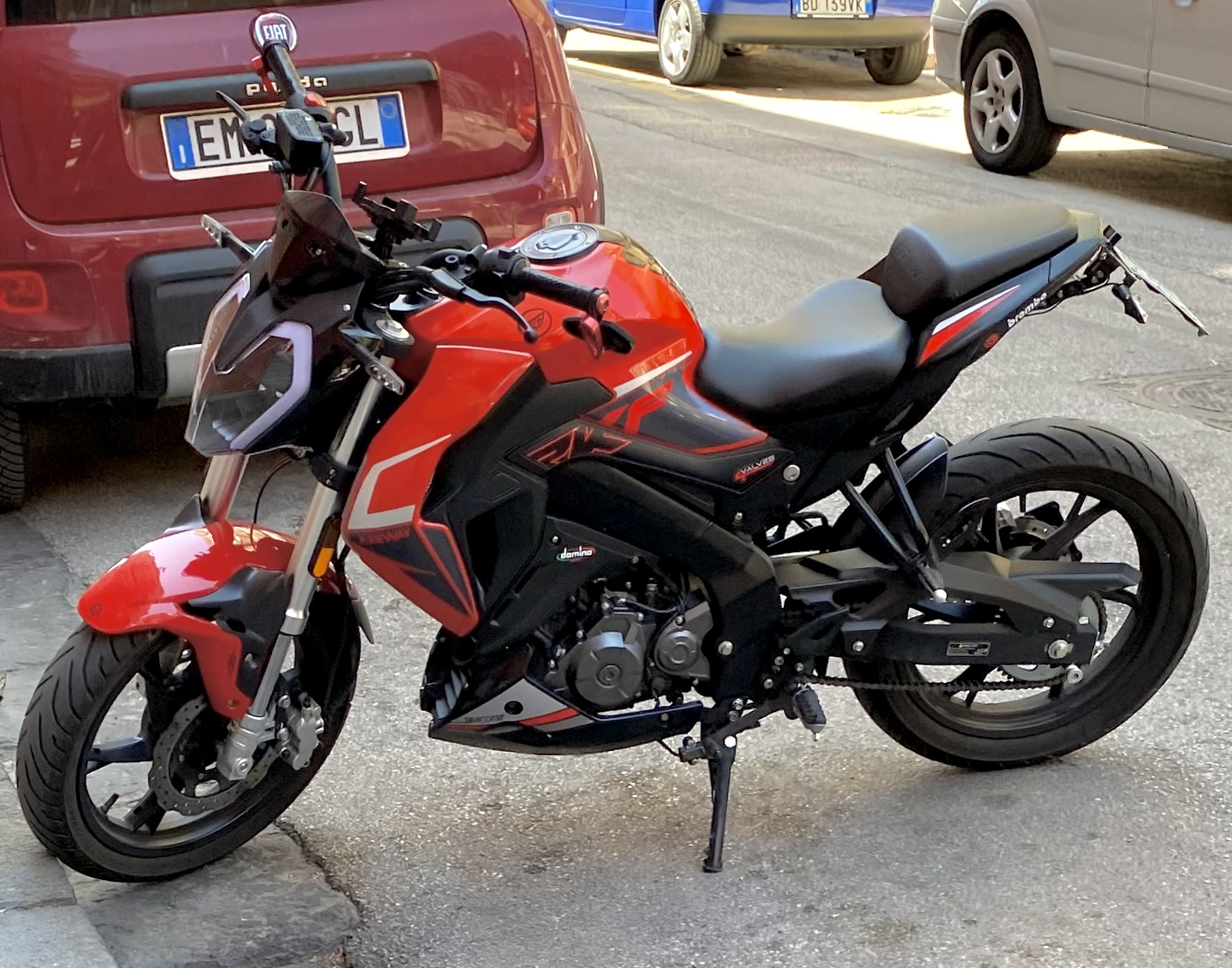
- Manufacturer: Keeway Motors
- Also called: Benelli 180S
- Production: 2018–present
- Predecessor: Keeway RKS 125
- Class: Naked bike
- Engine: 124 cc (7.6 cu in) four-stroke, liquid-cooled, single-cylinder
- Seat height: 810 mm (32 in)
- Weight: 147 kg (dry)
- Fuel capacity: 10 L (2.2 imp gal; 2.6 US gal)
- Related: Keeway RKV 125

The Keeway RKF 125 is a naked motorcycle produced by Keeway Motors since 2018.

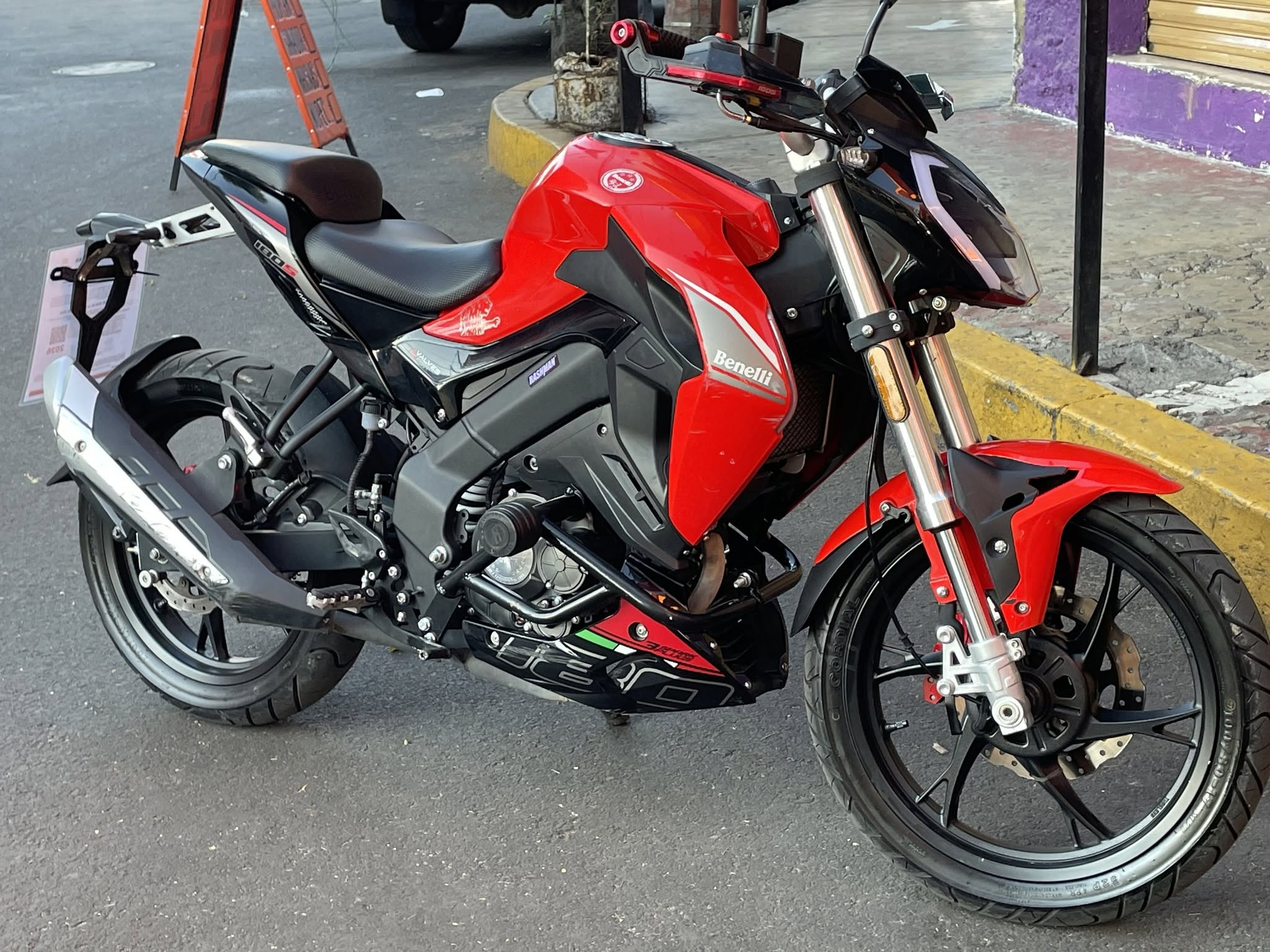
Benelli 180S

The RKF 125 is a naked bike, presented at EICMA in Milan in 2017. The motorcycle is equipped with a 125cc single-cylinder, four-stroke, liquid-cooled engine with electronic fuel injection and a catalytic converter, and is Euro 4 compliant. It develops 12.7 hp at 9,500 rpm and 10 Nm of torque at 7,500 rpm. Distribution is handled by four overhead valves controlled by a double overhead camshaft. Power is transferred to the rear wheel via a wet multi-plate clutch combined with a six-speed gearbox and chain final drive.

The braking system consists of a 260mm disc at the front and a 240mm disc at the rear, with a combined braking system. The frame is a perimeter steel box-section type.

With the 2025 model it is updated to Euro 5+ and undergoes an increase in horsepower to 14.75 hp and the addition of ABS.

In South America a 180cc version was sold rebadged Benelli 180S.
