= Brixton motorcycles =

Australian motorcycle company

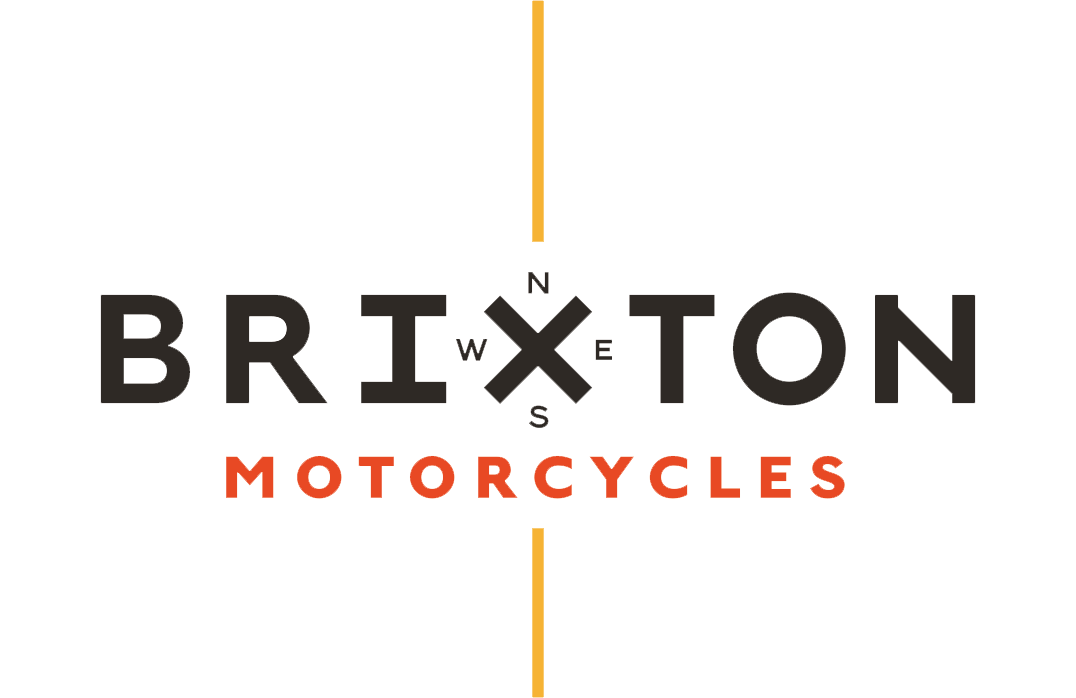
- Brixton motorcycles logo

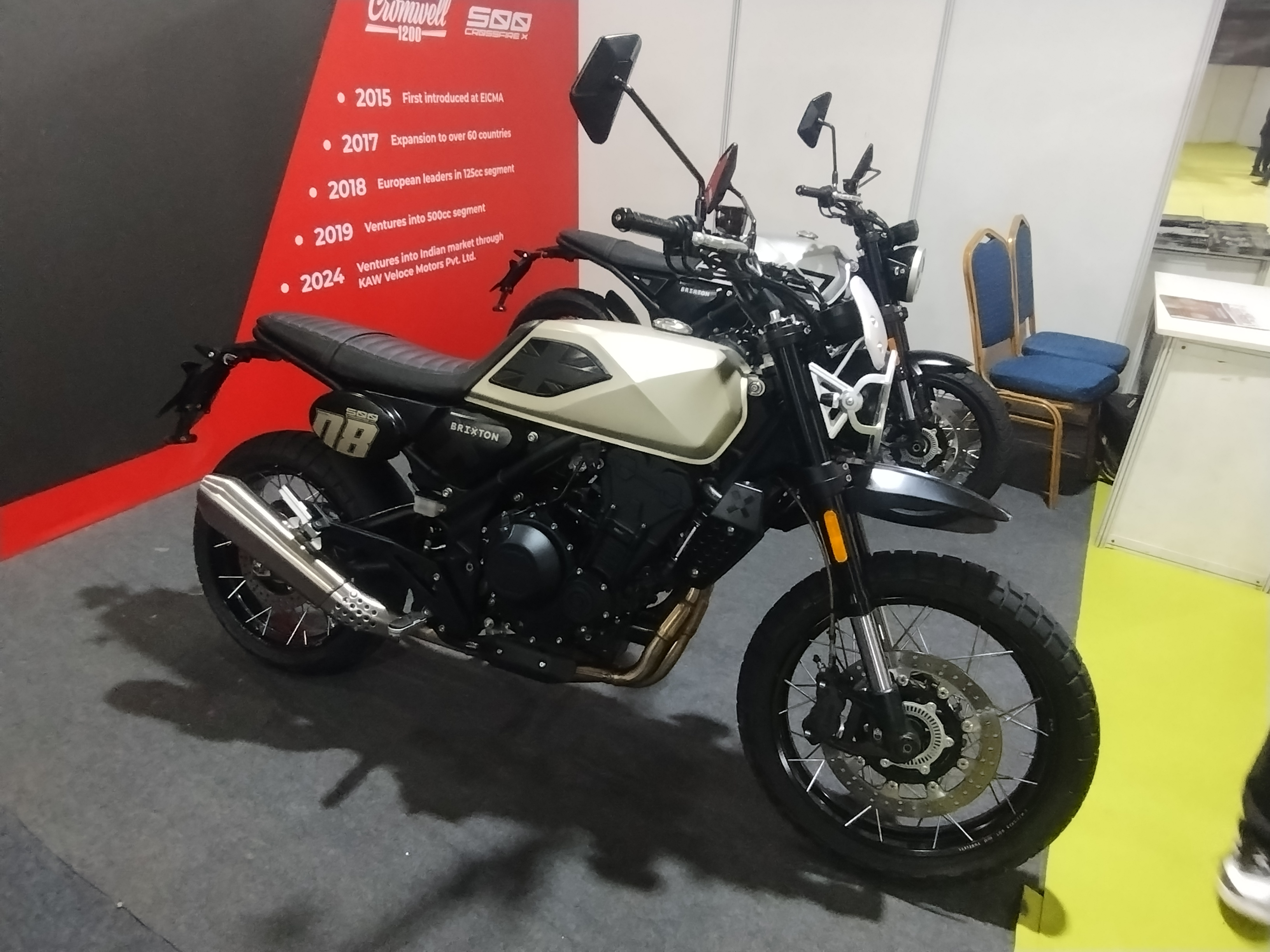
- Brixton Crossfire 500XC motorbike at 4th International Auto Show, Bangalore (2025)
- Industry: Motorcycle manufacturer
- Founded: 2015, Austria
- Headquarters: Austria
- Parent: KSR Group
- Website: www.brixton-motorcycles.com

Brixton motorcycles is an Austrian motorcycle brand, owned by KSR Group.

== Company ==
First motorbike launched by Brixton was called BX 125, at the EICMA in Milan in 2015.

Brixton motorcycle models include:

- Cromwell series
- Felsberg series
- Rayburn series
- Sunray series
- Crossfire series

Brixton launched four models of motorbikes in India namely Crossfire 500X, Crossfire 500XC, Cromwell 1200, and Cromwell 1200X, in November 2024. Deliveries began in January 2025.

== Media gallery ==
Brixton exhibit stands at automobile shows
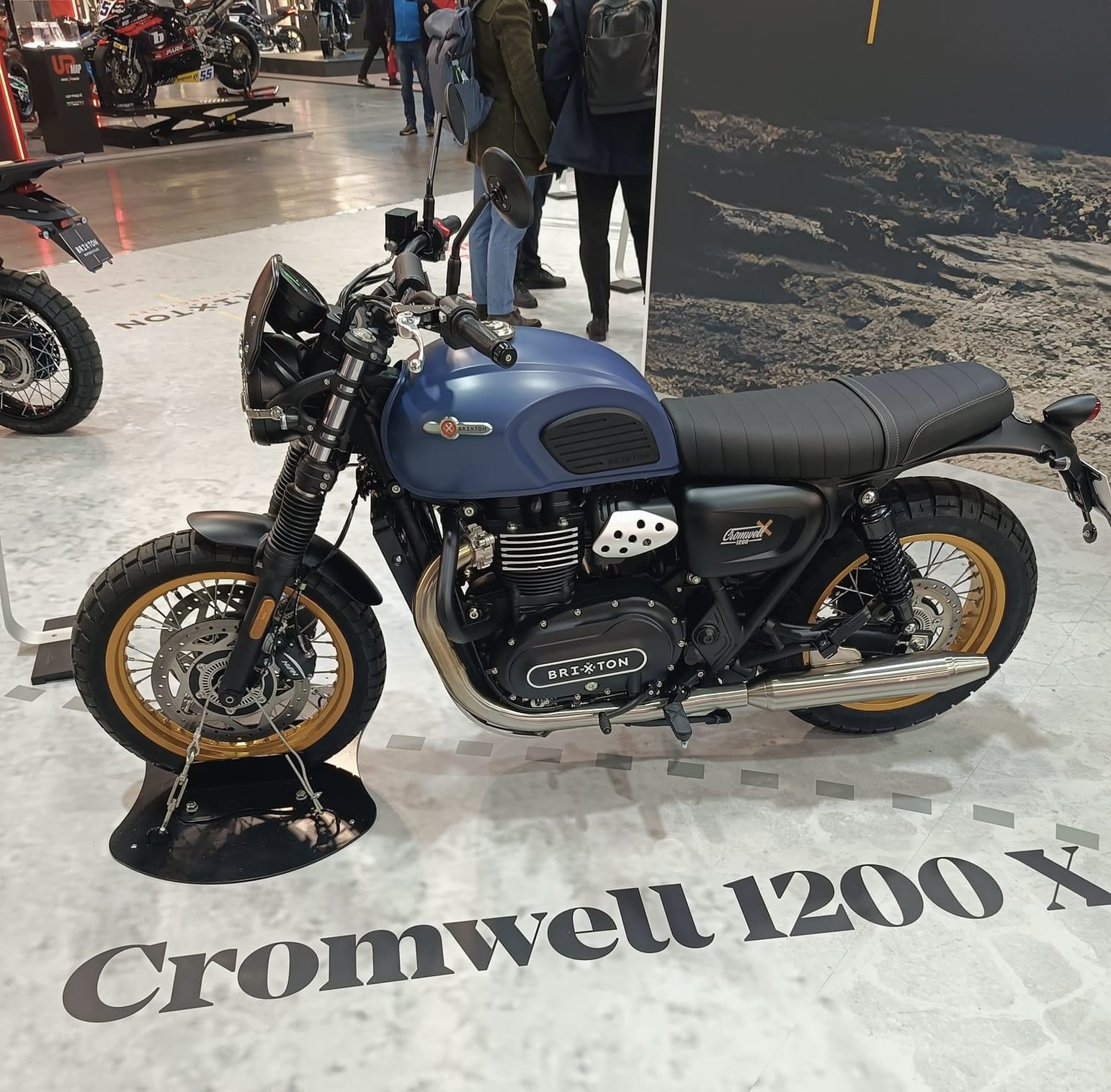

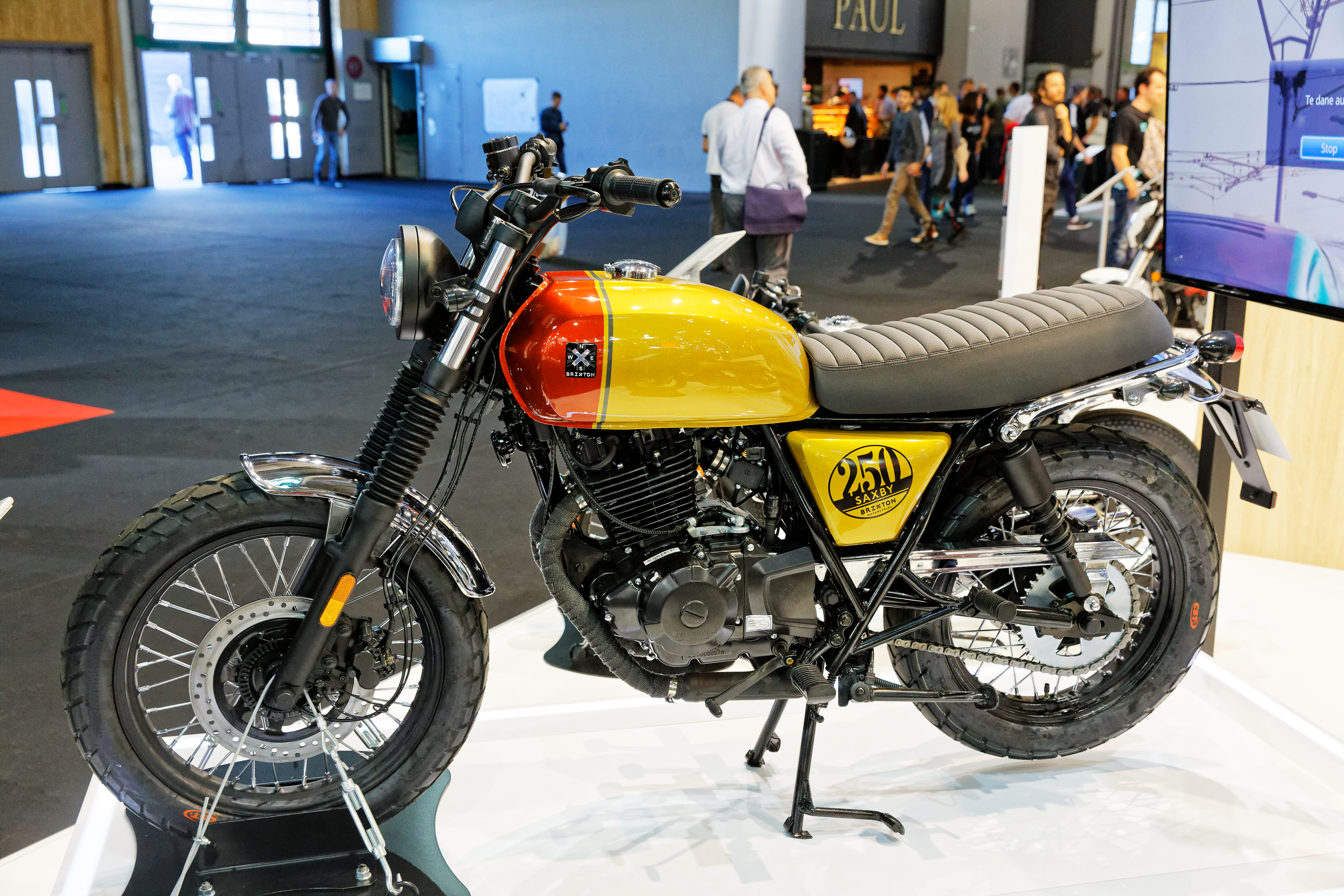

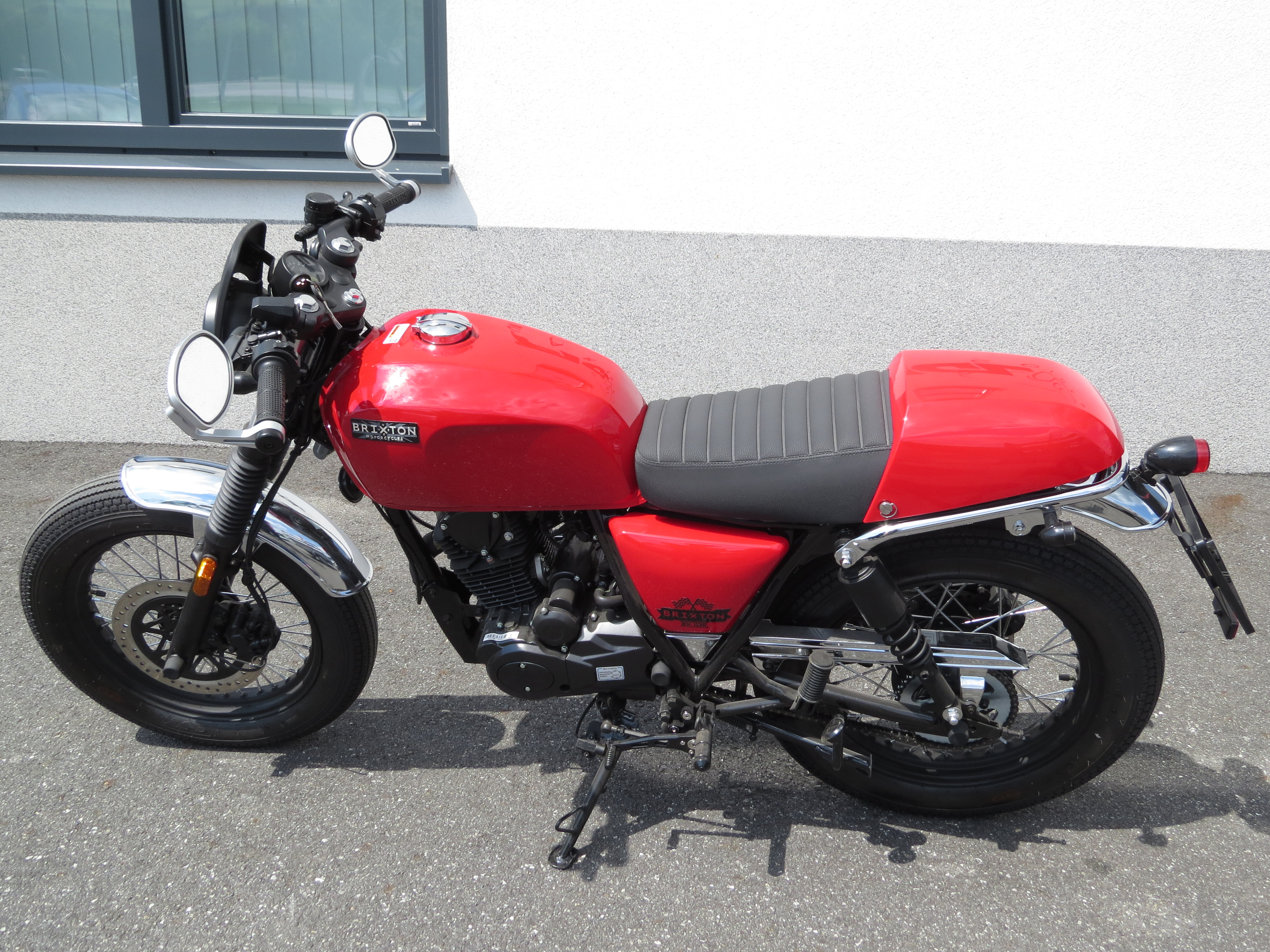

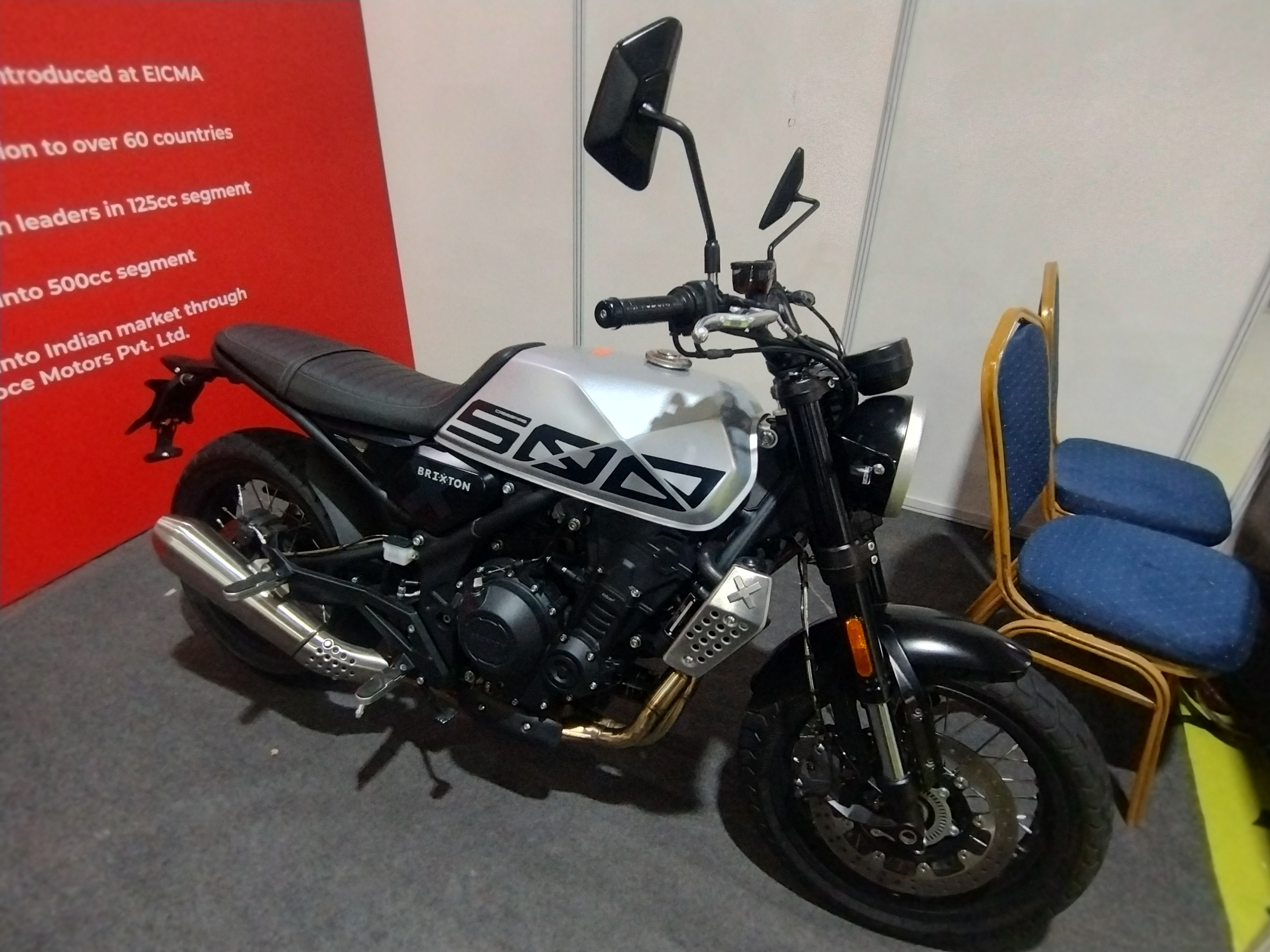
