= Qianjiang Motorcycle =

Chinese motorcycle manufacturer

Zhejiang Qianjiang Motorcycle Group Co. Ltd.
- Qianjiang Motorcycle logo

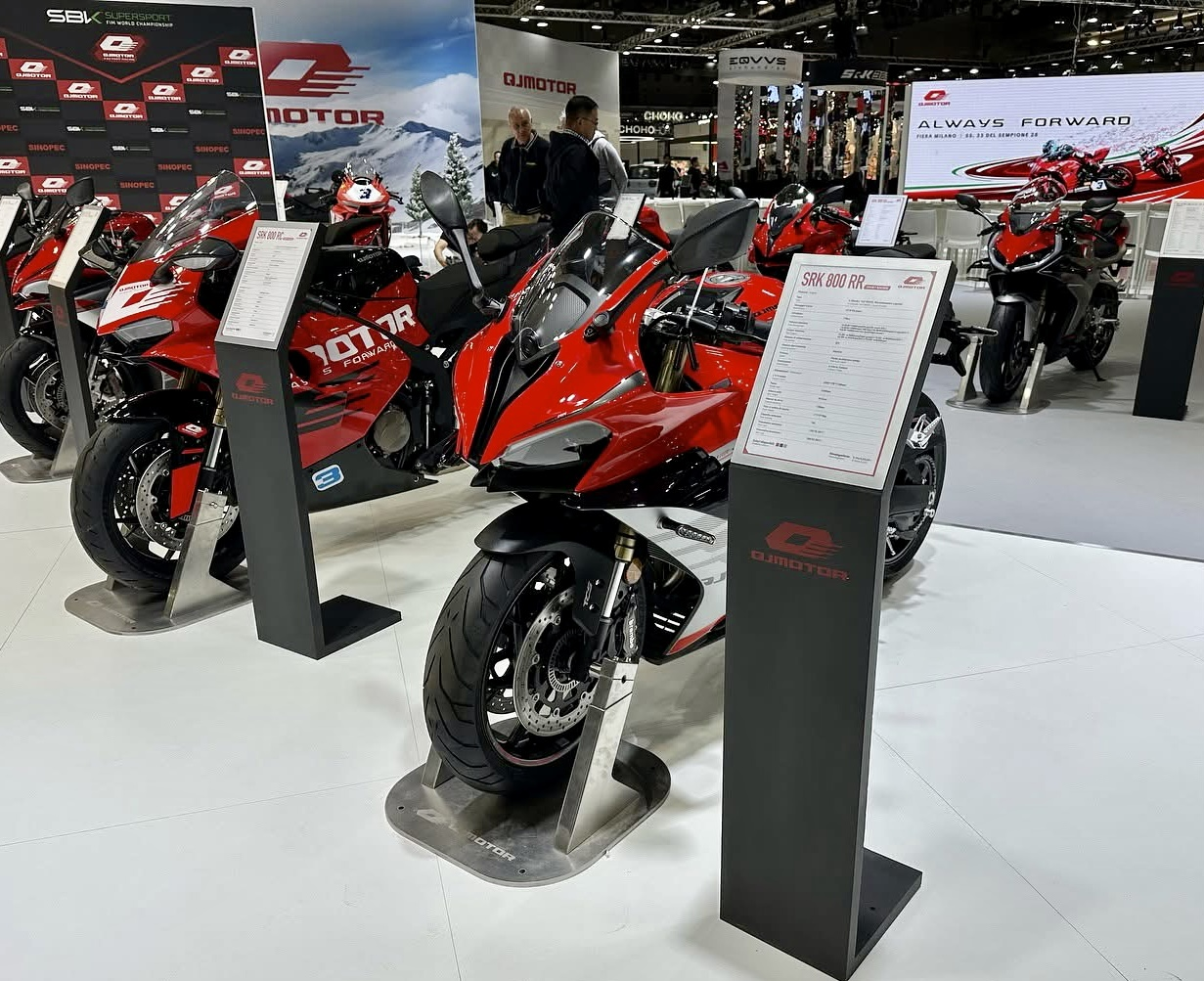
- QJMotor SRK 800 RR motorcycles at EICMA 2025
- Trade name: QJMOTOR
- Type: Public
- Traded as: SZSE: 000913
- Industry: Personal transport manufacturer
- Founded: 1985; 41 years ago
- Headquarters: Wenling, Zhejiang Province, China
- Area served: Worldwide
- Key people: Zhihao Xu (Chairman)
- Products: Motorcycles, scooters
- Revenue: ▲CN¥5.28 billion (2022)
- Net income: ▲CN¥418 million (2022)
- Total assets: ▲CN¥4.72 billion (2022)
- Total equity: ▲CN¥3.50 billion (2022)
- Owner: Geely (36.61%); Wenling Qianjiang Investment Management Co. (10.05%)
- Number of employees: 5152 (2022)
- Subsidiaries: Benelli
- Website: global.qjmotor.com

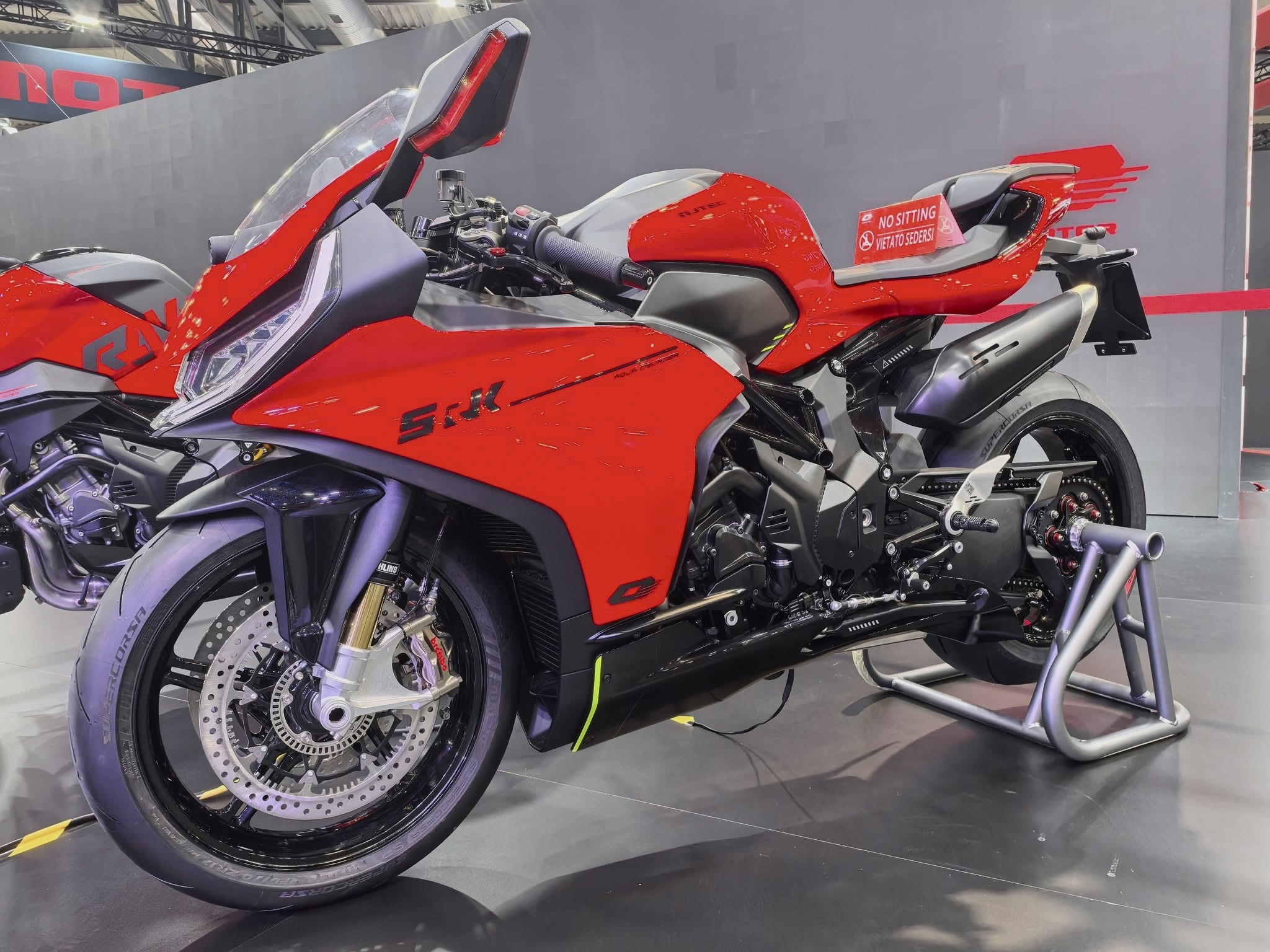
QJMOTOR SRK 1000RR

Qianjiang Motorcycle Group, doing business as QJMOTOR, is a Chinese motorcycle manufacturer founded in 1985 and headquartered in Winling, Zhejiang Province. It is one of the largest two-wheeled vehicle manufacturers in China.

Since September 2016, Chinese auto giant Geely has been Qianjiang's largest shareholder.

== Brands ==
QJMOTOR markets the entire range of Qianjiang products in China, including motorcycles and scooters. Since 1999, Qianjiang has marketed motorcycles outside China.

The company acquired the Benelli brand in 2005 and debuted the brand at the 2022 EICMA motorcycle show in Milan, Italy.

== International ==
In 2024, QJMOTOR arranged exclusive distribution of its models in Europe with SIMA (replacing DIP SAS in that role). The new agreement covers Belgium, France, Luxembourg, the Netherlands, and Switzerland. SIMA distributes other motorcycle brands in Europe, including Hyosung and Royal Enfield, while owning retro-maker Mash Motorcycles.

=== Italy ===
In 2005, Qianjiang acquired Benelli. In 2009 they invested an added $26 million "to help revitalize the Italian brand." In recommitting to their investment in Benelli, Qianjang Motors general manager Haimei Yan said, "Although we have not yet turned a profit in the budget, we are here to stay, and believe in the company." The company announcement in late-2021 of the new TRK 800 adventure bike model stated it was "born in the Benelli Style Centre and developed by the R&D department of the House of the Leoncino in Pesaro, where the headquarters and the heart of the company are located."

In 2023 MV Agusta Motor S.p.A. announced a strategic partnership with QJMOTOR for distribution of its motorcycles in China. Dongshao Guo, general manager of Qianjiang Motor, said of the arrangement, "We hope [...] we will be able to work together to import more high-performance motorcycles for Chinese customers, that are fashionable, easy to handle, and fun to ride." Qianjiang had an agreement to make the Lucky Explorer MV Agusta adventure bike (and use their large-capacity four-cylinder engine in future models). Of the two versions of this bike QJMOTOR was due to build for MV Agusta – the 5.5 and 9.5 (denoting engine size) – manufacture of the 5.5 was halted with the purchase of a 25.1% stake in the Italian company by the Pierer Mobility Group, owner of KTM and Husqvarna, which has as a long-standing partnership with CFMoto.

Qianjiang is in a joint venture with Marzocchi to make motorcycle suspensions in China.

=== United States ===
As part of its "More Roads to Harley-Davidson" strategy, Harley-Davidson announced June 2019 a partnership with Qianjiang Motorcycle Company to develop a 338cc "baby Harley" model motorcycle for Chinese and other Asian markets.

The QJMOTOR brand entered the US market in 2023, distributing 11 models.

== Models ==
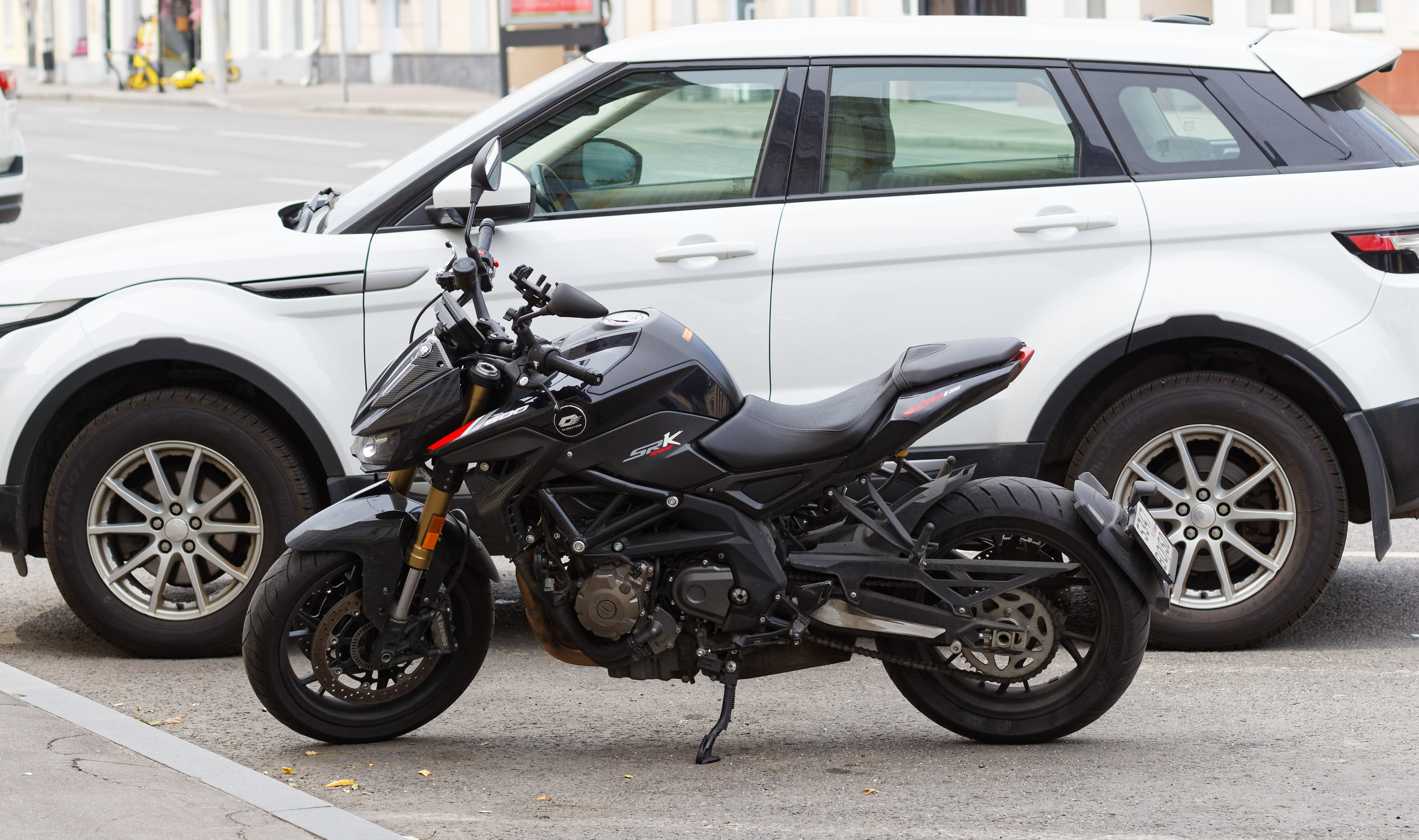
QJMOTOR SRK 600

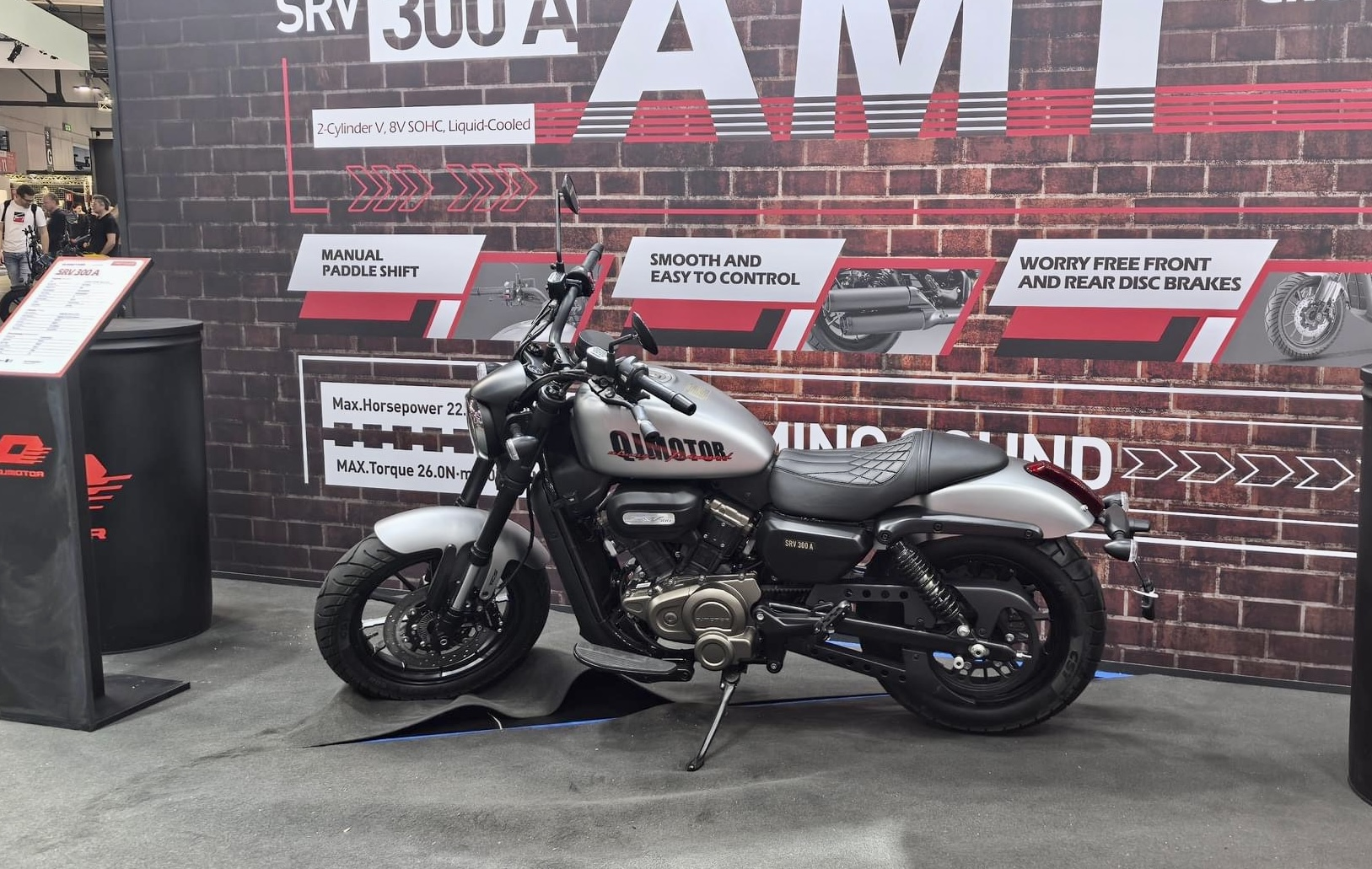
QJMOTOR SRV 300

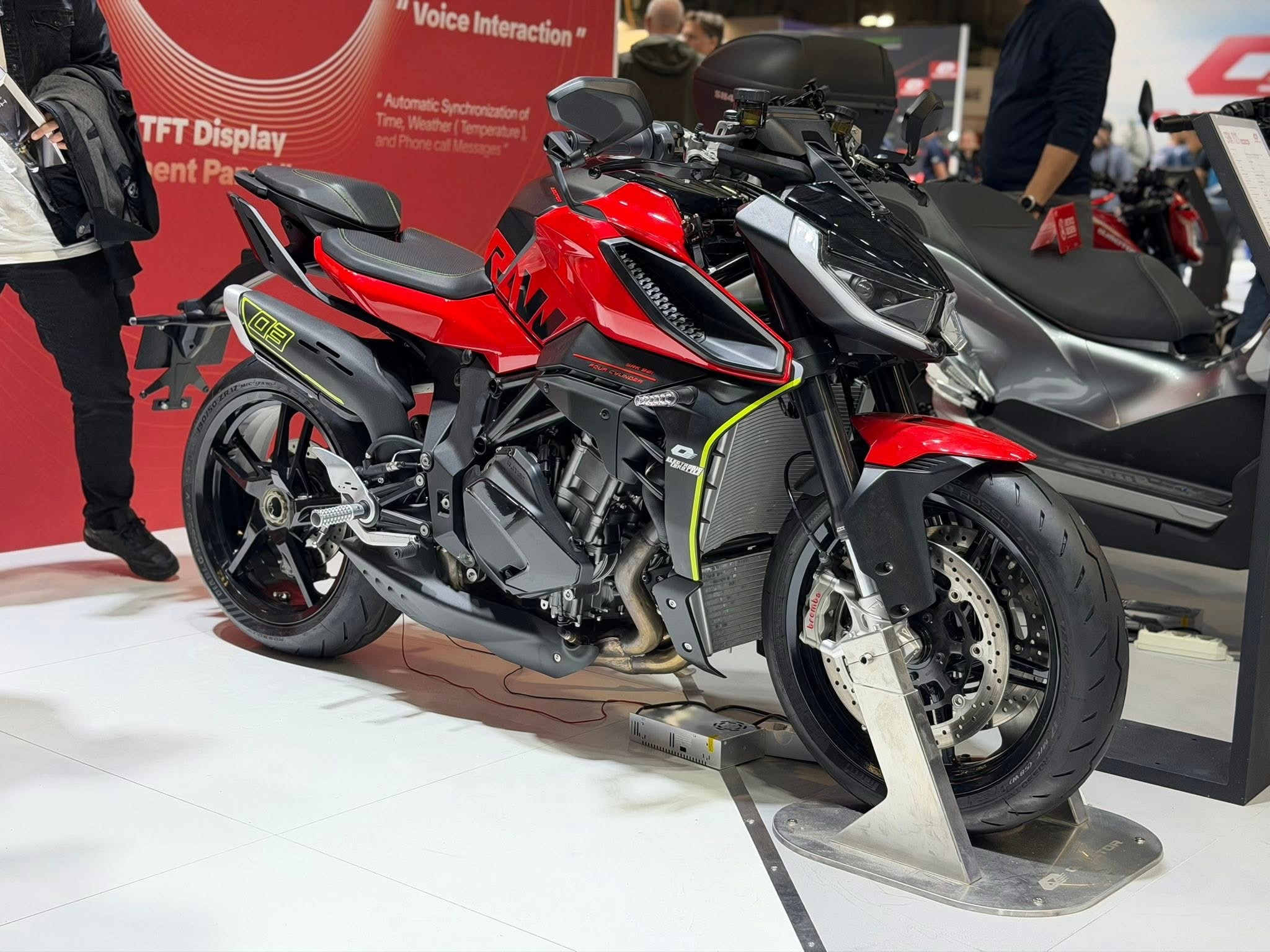
QJMOTOR SRK 921

=== Motorcycles ===
Some of the more popular Qianjiang motorcycle and scooter models as of May 2023 are:

==== Enduro/Supermoto ====
- COV 125
- COV 500

==== Standard/Naked ====
- SRK 125S
- SRK 250
- SRK 300
- SRK 400
- SRK 500
- SRK 600
- SRK 800
- SRK 900
- SRK 921
- SRK 1000

==== Sport ====
- SRK 125R
- SRK 250R
- SRK 250RR
- SRK 250RD
- SRK 300R
- SRK 400RR
- SRK 421RR
- SRK 500R
- SRK 600RS
- SRK 800RR
- SRK 921RR
- SRK 1000RR
- SRK 1051RR
- Super 9

==== Dual–Sport ====
- SRT 300DX
- SRT 450RX
- SRT 550X
- SRT 800X
- SRT 600SX
- SRT 700SX
- SRT 800SX
- SRT 900SX

==== Cruiser ====
- SRV 125
- SRV 250
- SRV 300
- SRV 400
- SRV 500
- SRV 600
- SRV 700
- SRV 900

=== Scooters ===
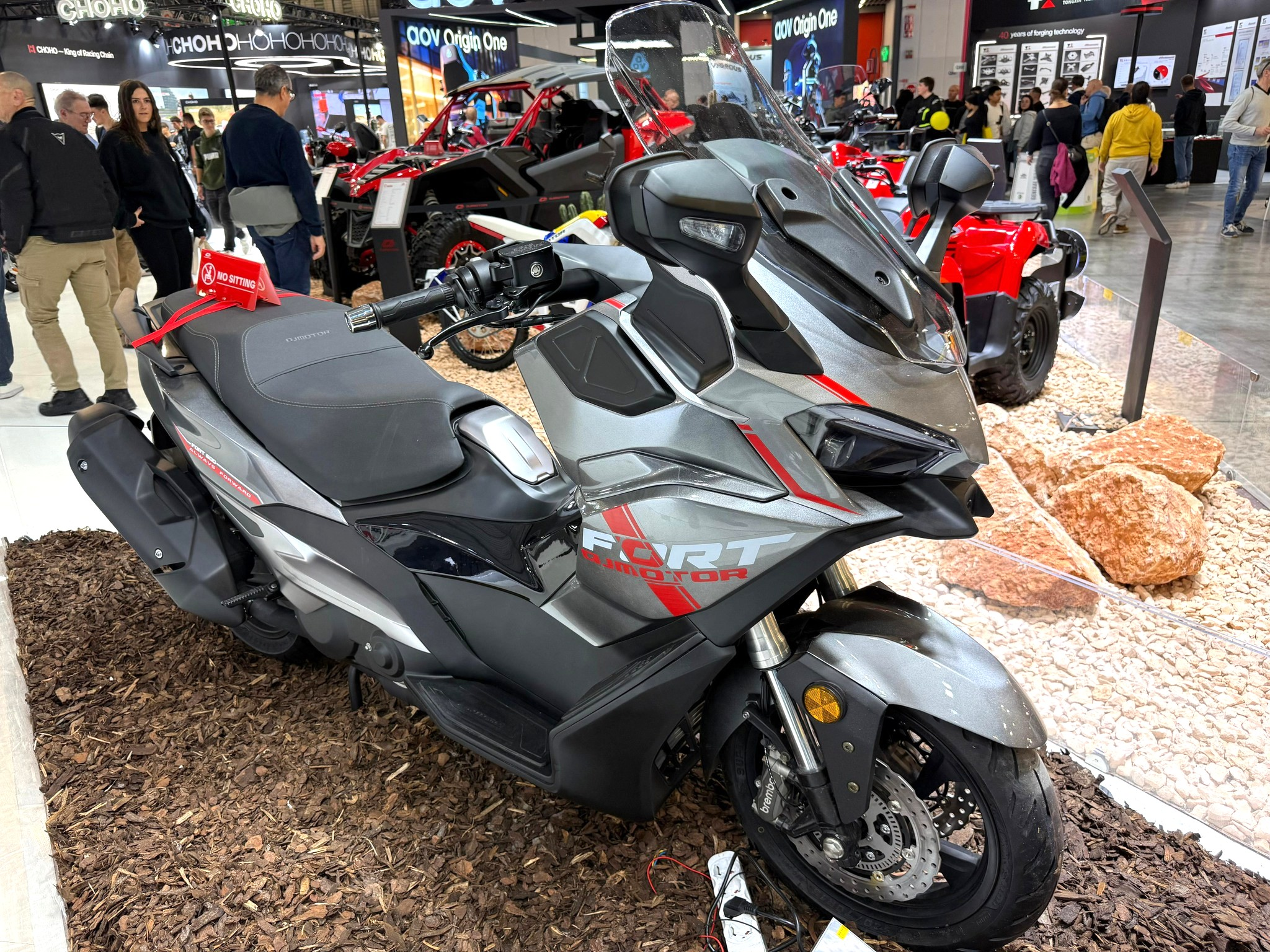
QJMOTOR FORT 600

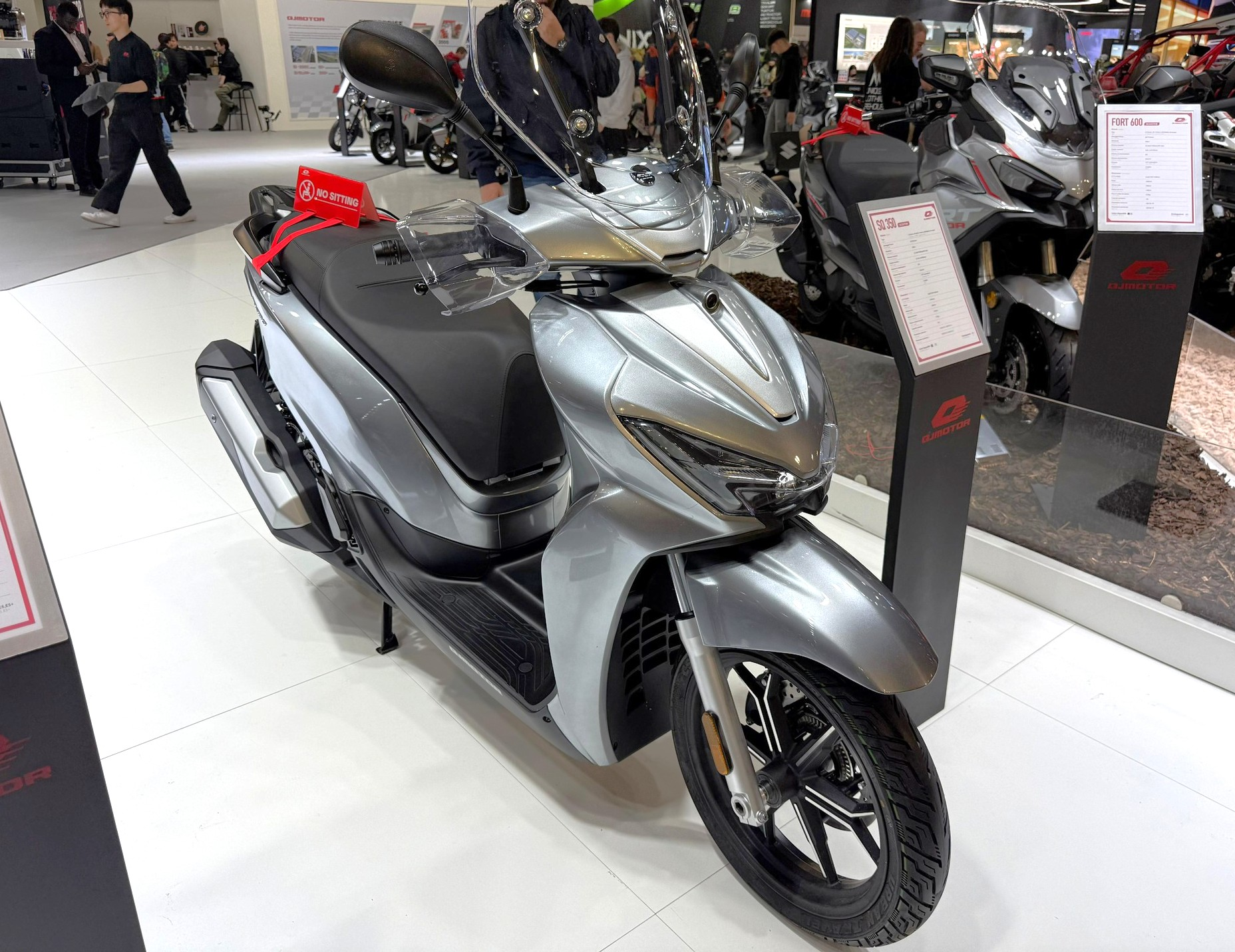
QJMOTOR SQ 350

- FORT 125
- FORT 250
- FORT 350
- FORT 600
- FORT 4.0
- MTX 300
- VPS 125
- CTR 125
- LTR 50S
- LTR 125
- LTS 50S
- LTS 125S
- SQ 16
- SQ 200
- SQ 350
- AX 200S

=== ATVs ===
- SFA 600
- SFA 1000

Many of these models are rebadged under different brands.

A mid-displacement cruiser called the C352LS under the brand name MBP, or Moto Bologna Passione, was announced for the European market in May 2024, as were the MBP N250 and N300 (the latter destined for Asian markets).

=== Electric ===
- OAO
- OMO 07
- OMO 03
- DQ
- E-LTR
- Q2
- MOi

== Engines ==
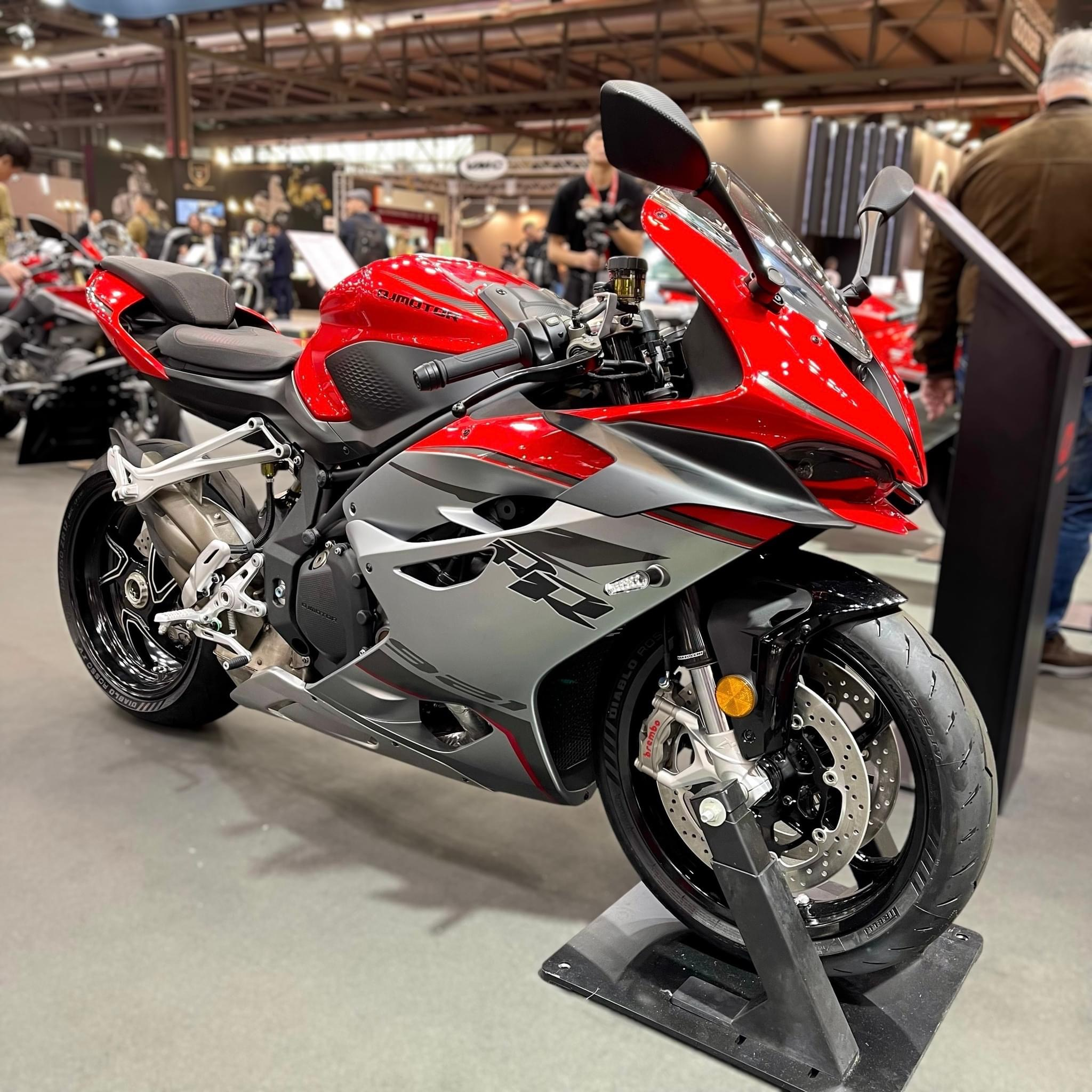
QJMOTOR SRK 921RR

Recent QJMOTOR engine development includes launching a new 800cc machine in 2023 for the SRK 800RR model, the company's third four-cylinder engine. Launched in 2020, SRK 600RR, China's first four-cylinder bike, was based on an engine designed by Benelli. QJMOTOR "teased" new four-cylinder engine in 2023, a 600cc V-4 to power a new muscle-cruiser. A fourth four-cylinder motorcycle, the 1000RR "superbike", will be driven by an MV Agusta engine.

In 2024, QJMOTOR announced development of its Supermono engine, a V-shaped two-cylinder arrangement with only one firing cylinder; the second cylinder and piston used only as a counterweight – borrowing the name from the famous Ducati Supermono engine (from 1990) made by cutting off the rear cylinder of its Desmoquattro two-cylinder engine.

In 2022, a patent appeared for a new 900cc parallel-twin to be developed by QJMOTOR and used by Benelli in a new model motorcycle. Similarities to the KTM LC8c, licensed to CFMoto, were noted.

== Motorsport ==
In 2022, QJMotor became the main sponsor of Avintia Esponsorama Racing in the Moto3 class with its two riders, Matteo Bertelle and Elia Bartolini. Then in the 2023 and 2024 season, QJMotor became the main sponsor of Gresini Racing in the Moto2 championship. Since 2024 QJMotor also participates in the Supersport World Championship, and in the WorldSSP Challenge.

=== Grand Prix motorcycle racing results ===
Year	Class	Team name	Motorcycle	Riders	Races	Wins	Podiums	Poles	F. laps	Points	Pos.
2022	Moto3	QJMotor Avintia Racing Team	KTM RC250GP	(Italy) Matteo Bertelle	10	0	0	0	0	16	24th
2022	Moto3	QJMotor Avintia Racing Team	KTM RC250GP	(Italy) Elia Bartolini	20	0	0	0	0	27	22nd
2022	Moto3	QJMotor Avintia Racing Team	KTM RC250GP	(Italy) Luca Lunetta	1	0	0	0	0	0	35th
2022	Moto3	QJMotor Avintia Racing Team	KTM RC250GP	(Italy) Nicola Carraro	9	0	0	0	0	0	29th
2023	Moto2	QJMotor Gresini Moto2	Kalex Moto2	(Czech Republic) Filip Salač	19	0	1	1	0	110	11th
2023	Moto2	QJMotor Gresini Moto2	Kalex Moto2	(Spain) Jeremy Alcoba	20	0	0	0	1	48.5	18th
2023	Moto2	QJMotor Gresini Moto2	Kalex Moto2	(Italy) Matteo Ferrari	1	0	0	0	0	0	NC
2024	Moto2	QJMotor Gresini Moto2	Kalex Moto2	(Spain) Manuel González	20	1	5	1	1	195	3rd
2024	Moto2	QJMotor Gresini Moto2	Kalex Moto2	(Spain) Albert Arenas	20	0	0	0	0	88	13th
2024	Moto2	QJMotor Gresini Moto2	Kalex Moto2	(Italy) Matteo Ferrari	2	0	0	0	0	1	29th
2025	Moto2	QJMotor Frinsa MSi	Boscoscuro B‐25	(Spain) Iván Ortolá	22	0	1	0	1	88	16th
2025	Moto2	QJMotor Frinsa MSi	Boscoscuro B‐25	(Spain) Óscar Gutiérrez	3	0	0	0	0	4	27th
2025	Moto2	QJMotor Frinsa MSi	Boscoscuro B‐25	(Spain) Sergio García	5 (8)	0	0	0	0	3	28th
2025	Moto2	QJMotor Frinsa MSi	Boscoscuro B‐25	(Spain) Unai Orradre	6	0	0	0	0	0	32nd
2025	Moto2	QJMotor Frinsa MSi	Boscoscuro B‐25	(Spain) Eric Fernández	6 (7)	0	0	0	0	0	31st
2025	Moto2	QJMotor Frinsa MSi	Boscoscuro B‐25	(Australia) Harrison Voight	2	0	0	0	0	0	41st
2026	Moto2	QJMotor MSi	Kalex Moto2	(Spain) Iván Ortolá	15	2	4	1	3	168.5*	3rd*
2026	Moto2	QJMotor MSi	Kalex Moto2	(Spain) Ángel Piqueras	11	0	0	0	0	4*	26th*
2026	Moto2	QJMotor MSi	Kalex Moto2	(Spain) Unai Orradre	2	0	0	0	0	0*	30th*
2026	Moto2	QJMotor MSi	Kalex Moto2	(Spain) Marcos Ramírez	2 (5)	0	0	0	0	0*	28th*

* Season still in progress.

== See also ==
- Keeway RKF
