= Geely Auto =

Chinese car manufacturer and brand

Geely Automobile Holdings Limited
- Type: Public
- Traded as: SEHK: 175
- ISIN: KYG3777B1032
- Industry: Automotive
- Founded: 1998; 28 years ago
- Headquarters: Hangzhou, Zhejiang, China
- Area served: Worldwide
- Key people: Li Shufu (chairman); Li Donghui (vice chairman); Gui Shengyue (CEO); Stefan Sielaff (global designer)
- Products: Automobiles
- Production output: ▲3,024,567 vehicles (2025)
- Revenue: ▲CN¥345.2 billion (2025)
- Net income: ▲CN¥4.945 billion (2023)
- Total assets: ▲CN¥192.59 billion (2023)
- Total equity: ▲CN¥85.15 billion (2023)
- Owner: Zhejiang Geely Holding (39.94%); Proper Glory Holding (26.2%)
- Number of employees: ▲ approx. 64,000 (December 2024)
- Parent: Zhejiang Geely Holding
- Divisions: Geely Galaxy; Geely Radar; LEVC
- Subsidiaries: Genius Auto Finance (75%); Zeekr; Zeekr Technology Europe (50.8%); Lynk & Co (49%); Proton Holdings (49.9%); Zhejiang Aisin (40%); Renault Geely do Brasil (21.3%); Renault Korea (34.02%); BelGee (36.7%); Horse Powertrain (33%)

Chinese name
- Simplified Chinese: 吉利汽车控股有限公司
- Hanyu Pinyin: Jílì Qìchē Kònggǔ Yǒuxiàn Gōngsī
- Rating: BBB− (S&P); Baa3 (Moody's)
- Website: geelyauto.com.hk

Geely Automobile Holdings Limited, commonly known as Geely Auto (/ˈdʒiːli/; Chinese: 吉利汽车; pinyin: Jílì Qìchē), is a publicly traded automotive company predominantly owned by the Zhejiang Geely Holding (ZGH) group. It owns the eponymous Geely Auto brand and partly owns Lynk & Co, Proton Cars and Zeekr brands. The company is incorporated in the Cayman Islands and listed on the Hong Kong Stock Exchange.

Established in 1986 by Li Shufu in Ningbo, Zhejiang, China, Geely initially focused on refrigerators before transitioning to motorcycles in 1994. In 1997, Geely entered the automotive industry, becoming China's first privately-owned car manufacturer. Its first product, the Geely Haoqing rolled off the production line in 1998. In 2004, the company went public on the Hong Kong Stock Exchange.

The company is the largest subsidiary of Zhejiang Geely Holding, producing over 2.17 million out of the 3.33 million vehicles produced by the group in 2024. Around 888,000 were new energy vehicles (plug-in hybrid and battery electric vehicles). It also has the largest number of employees, with 60,000 out of the group's total of over 130,000 employees.

Geely is a phonetic transliteration of the company's native name 吉利 (pinyin: Jílì), which means "auspicious" or "propitious" in Chinese.

In August 2026, Li is stepping down as CEO of Geely Auto.

== Structure ==
Geely Automobile Holdings or hereinafter Geely Auto is a publicly listed company within Zhejiang Geely Holding, a conglomerate largely owned by Li Shufu. Since February 2017, Geely Auto became a constituent of the Hang Seng Index. As of 2024, Zhejiang Geely Holding is the largest shareholder of Geely Auto by holding 39.94% stake, followed by Proper Glory Holding Inc., a holding company partly owned by Zhejiang Geely Holding that held 26.2%. At least 76% of Geely Auto's stake is held by companies connected to Li Shufu.

Geely Auto fully owns Geely, Geely Galaxy, and Radar Auto (Riddara) brands. Lynk & Co ownership is shared with Zeekr, another Geely Auto subsidiary. Proton Holdings is jointly owned (via subsidiary Linkstate Overseas Limited) with long-time Malaysian owner DRB-HICOM. In February 2024, Geely Auto sold its 45% stake in battery swapping joint venture brand Livan Automotive to Geely Qizheng, another company under Zhejiang Geely Holding. Since May 2024, Zeekr became a New York Stock Exchange (NYSE) listed company with Geely Auto retaining 62.8% stake. The company also controls 75% of Geely's financing arm, Genius Auto Finance Co., Ltd.

Zhejiang Geely Holding only considers Geely, Lynk & Co, Proton, and Livan (until 2024) as part of the "Geely Auto Group" business unit, while Zeekr is considered a standalone business unit.

Zhejiang Geely; Holding
Geely Automobile; Holdings
Geely Auto | Zeekr | Radar Auto | Proton; Holdings
Geely Galaxy | Lynk & Co

== Corporate leadership ==
=== Chairman ===
- He Xuechu (2002–2005)
- Li Shufu (2005–present)

=== Chief executive officer ===
- Xu Gang (2002–2006)
- Gui Shengyue (2006–present)

== History ==
Geely was established in 1986 in Ningbo, Zhejiang by Li Shufu. Initially, the company entered the refrigerator manufacturing industry in Taizhou, Zhejiang. To start the company, Li Shufu had to borrow funds from his family. In 1994, Geely transitioned into the motorcycle industry by acquiring a state-run firm, and started producing China's first scooter.

Li Shufu has described the company's development as encompassing three eras: the "1.0 era" of machinery, the "2.0 era" of electronics, and the "3.0 era" of intelligence.

=== 1997–2007 ===
In 1996, Geely Group Co., Ltd. was formally established as a private company. The very first car made by Geely was completed in 1996, which is called the "Geely Number 01". It is a clone of a Mercedes-Benz E-Class (W210) with a chassis taken from a Hongqi CA7200, which in turn is based on the Audi 100. The prototype was conceived from Li Shufu's frustration over China's lack of a luxury carmaker. He wanted to prove that a Chinese company has the ability to produce luxury cars, according to his interview with CCTV in 2009. The car remained a single prototype and was never produced.

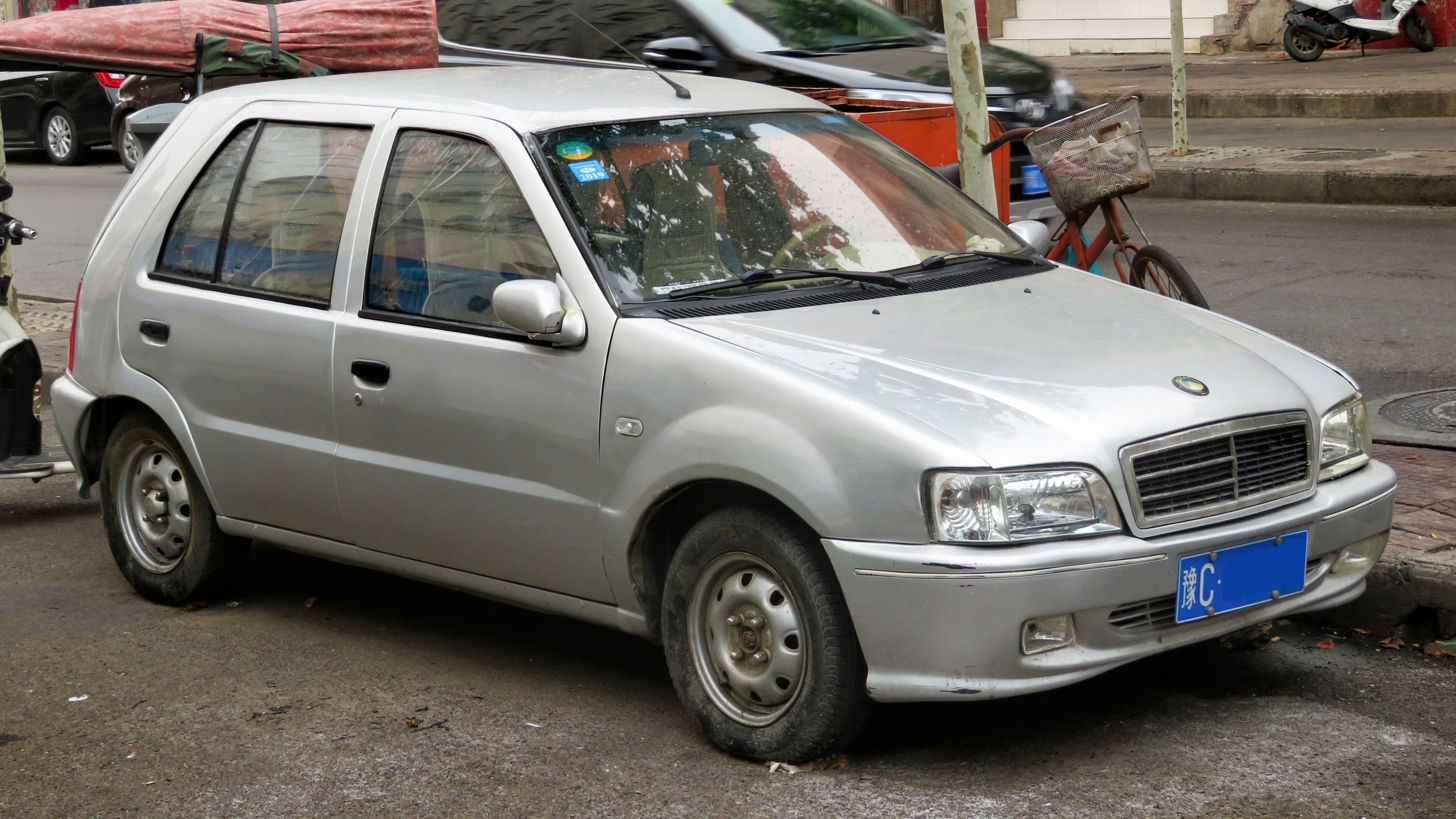
2003 Geely Haoqing

By 1997, the company had completed the construction of relevant factories and initial investment preparations to enter the automobile industry. This made Geely the first private automobile company in China, whereas other carmakers are state-owned enterprises such as Chery. Geely's first car, the Geely Haoqing, rolled off the assembly line in Linhai, Zhejiang on 8 August 1998. The Haoqing is similar to the small Japanese car Daihatsu Charade and is powered by a Daihatsu three-cylinder engine. However, Geely did not obtain its national production license until 9 November 2001, which delayed mass production until 2002. By 2002, the brand was ranked among the top ten in the Chinese automobile market. It also ranked 421st among the "Top 500 Companies in China" and 28th among the "Top 100 Companies in Zhejiang Province".

Geely was known for imbuing a sense of humor in the names of some of its vehicles. One of the early Geely brand sedan is called the "King Kong" and its early model was named Uliou (Chinese: 优利欧, You Li Ou), a play on words that literally means "better than the Tianjin Xiali (Chinese: 夏利, Xia Li) or the Buick Sail (Chinese: 赛欧, Sai Ou), two of its competitors.

In 2002, Geely shifted from being a family-operated entity to a joint-stock company managed by professional management. Zhejiang Geely Holding Group Co., Ltd. (ZGH) was established on 24 March 2003. In April 2003, Zhejiang Geely Holding entered a joint venture agreement with Guorun Holdings Co., Ltd., a company listed on the Hong Kong Stock Exchange, to expand Geely's automotive business. Geely and Guorun later created several other joint ventures. In January 2004, Li Shufu bought controlling shares in Guorun, and in March 2004, the company was renamed Geely Automobile Holdings Limited. This strategy was seen as a "backdoor" entry into the Hong Kong stock market, providing a means for the company to raise funds.

In August 2002, Geely Auto acquired Shanghai Jiashida Automobile Group Co., Ltd. to form the Shanghai Maple vehicle manufacturing base. In August 2003, the first car from Shanghai Maple called Maple Biaofeng rolled off the assembly line. In January 2003, Geely launched its first sports car, the Geely BL, which went on sale in November 2003.

In the second half of 2003, the Chinese government initiated macro-control measures on the automobile industry and ended its micromanagement policies, which caused a sharp decline in the automotive market following years of growth. Geely took advantage of the situation by starting its independent research and development effort, investing hundreds of millions of yuan in technological upgrades of its factory. As a result of these changes, the quality of Geely cars improved, and sales increased, particularly in the economy car segment from 2003 to 2004. In August 2003, the first batch of Geely cars were exported overseas. Geely began to expand its presence in international markets by participating in the Frankfurt Auto Show in 2005 and the Detroit Auto Show in 2006.

In a 2012 report, Reuters detailed how Geely, through its subcontracted local engineering partner CH-Auto, reverse engineered a Toyota Aygo city car in 2005 to develop the similar Geely LC.

=== 2007–2014 ===
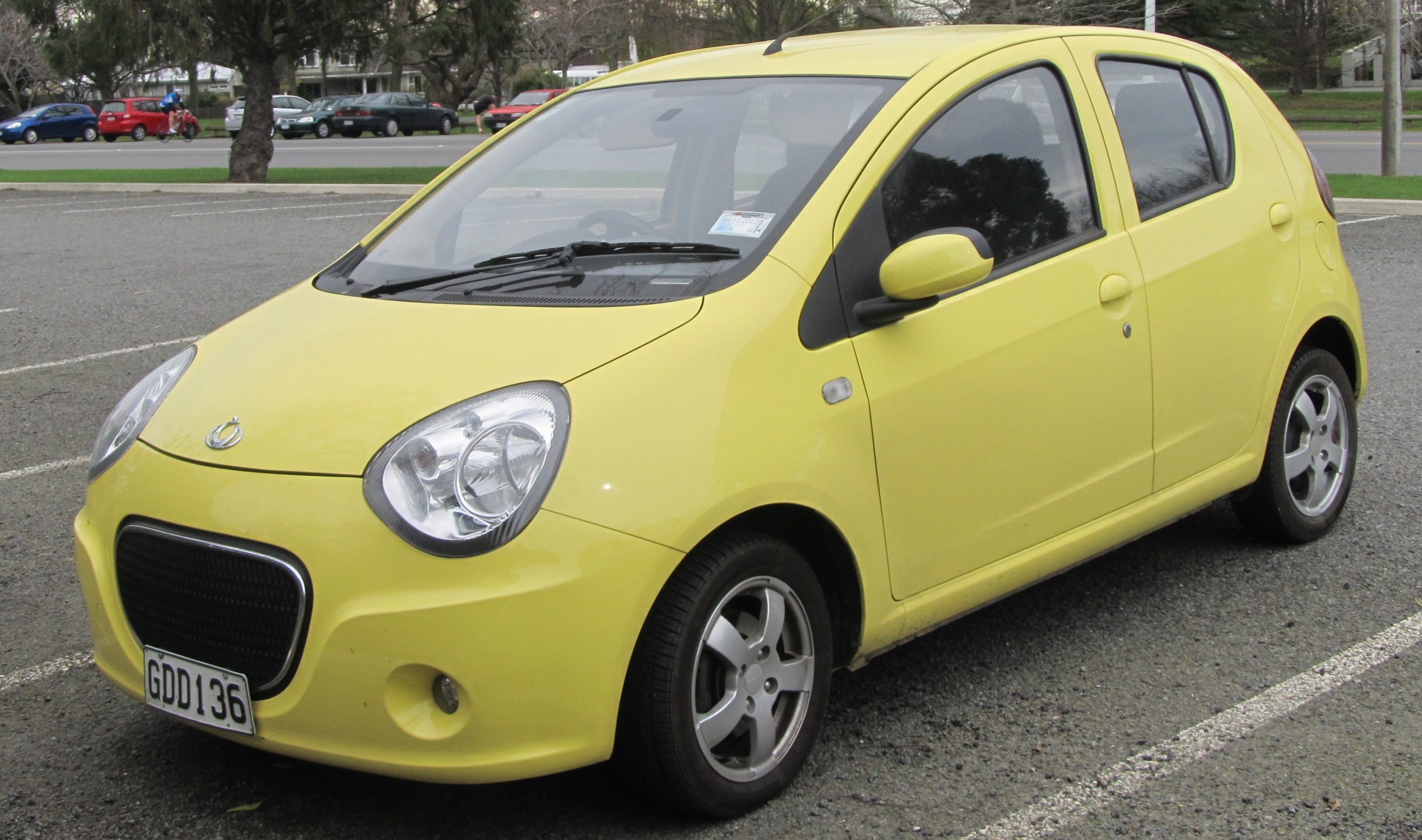
2011 Geely LC in New Zealand

From 2007 to 2008, Geely Auto shifted its strategy to focus on technology, quality, and service rather than competing on price. This new direction was outlined in their "Ningbo Declaration". This approach helped Geely navigate the 2008 financial crisis.

In January 2007, Geely Auto launched its Ukrainian semi-knock down (SKD) exports, by shipping the first batch of 300 sets of knock-down parts that would be assembled in Ukraine. By 2012, Geely became the second largest car exporter from China after Chery by exporting 100,300 vehicles. CKD facilities was also established with local partners in Russia, Indonesia and Egypt.

Geely Auto started developing its own turbocharged petrol engines, which it introduced in 2008. The engines helped Geely vehicles to compete in terms of power performance and fuel economy. In 2008, Geely Auto founded a new brand named Gleagle, followed by the Emgrand and Englon brands in 2010. The Englon brand was aimed to emulate a classic British brand. Its model line also included the London black cab model, the TX4 that Geely acquired while taking a stake in British company Manganese Bronze Holdings.

In late 2011, Geely appointed former Volvo designer Peter Horbury as Senior Vice President of Design. He led the development of the Geely Borui sedan, which is considered as the company's first "3.0 era" car.

=== 2014–present ===
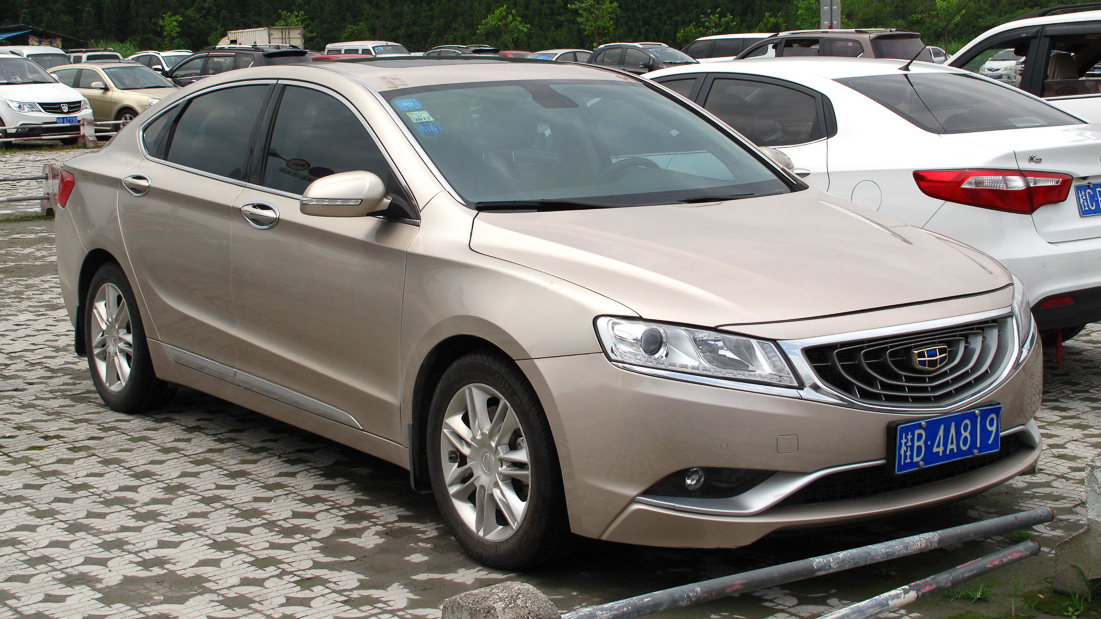
The Geely Borui, designed under the lead of Peter Horbury

Between 2013 and 2014, Geely Auto faced declining sales and outdated technology. The company undertook major restructuring in 2014 by merging its Emgrand, Haoqing, and Englon brands into a unified Geely brand, streamlining its product lineup. This restructuring paved the way for successful launches that the company describes as the "Era of Premium Cars 3.0", which include the Geely Borui in 2015, Geely Boyue in 2016, the Emgrand GS and Emgrand GL.

In October 2016, Geely Auto released its new brand called Lynk & Co in Berlin, Germany. The brand was launched with three production models, all based on the Compact Modular Architecture (CMA) developed by Zeekr Technology Europe, formerly China Euro Vehicle Technology (CEVT). Lynk & Co as a brand is positioned between Geely and Volvo. The brand also adopts innovative sales models such as direct-to-consumer sales model and subscription business model. In August 2017, Zhejiang Geely Holding, Geely Automobile Holdings, and Volvo Car Group signed an agreement at Geely Auto's Hangzhou Bay R&D Center to establish the Lynk & Co joint venture. Under this agreement, Geely Auto controls 50% of Lynk & Co, Volvo Cars held 30%, and Zhejiang Geely Holding held the remaining 20%.

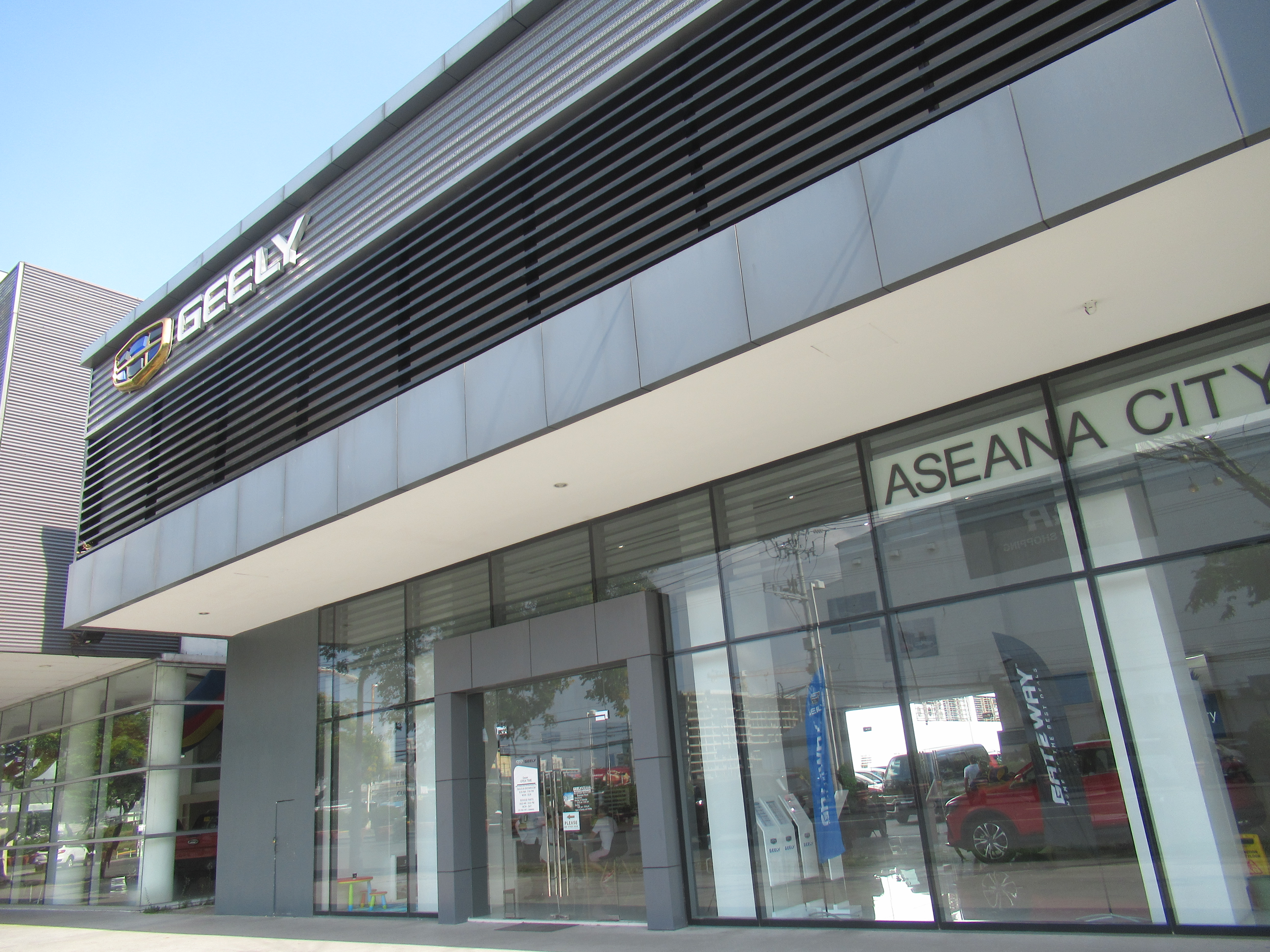
Geely dealership in Manila, Philippines

In 2018, Geely Auto entered a period that it describes as a "new phase", with the introduction of the "Technology Geely 4.0" architecture. This included the introduction of high-quality products dubbed the "Refined Vehicle Series" which includes the "Star" series such as the Geely Xingrui and Geely Xingyue, and the implementation of the NordThor E-Hybrid powertrain. Starting in 2018, Geely Auto saw increasing market share despite a declining market. By the end of that year, it had produced and sold over 1.5 million units with a diverse lineup of over 10 models, including models using the BMA platform. Despite challenges in 2019 such as trade tensions and new emission standards, Geely maintained strong growth by selling 651,680 vehicles in the first half of 2019, and enjoyed higher average selling prices with more high-end products.

In April 2019, Geely Auto launched its battery electric brand, Geometry. The brand was consolidated into Geely Auto in March 2023 as Geely Geometry, becoming its entry-level electric product series.

In March 2021, Zeekr was founded as the company's premium brand for battery electric vehicles. The company also released the "Smart Geely 2025 Strategy" focusing on intelligent and electrified vehicle development, and targeting an annual sales of 3.65 million vehicles under the Geely Auto, Lynk & Co, Geometry and Zeekr brands by 2025.

In November 2022, Geely Auto unveiled a new logo in conjunction with the 2022 Asian Games in Hangzhou. The brand also became the official automotive service partner for the sport event. The new logo is based on its old logo, but inverted and simplified.

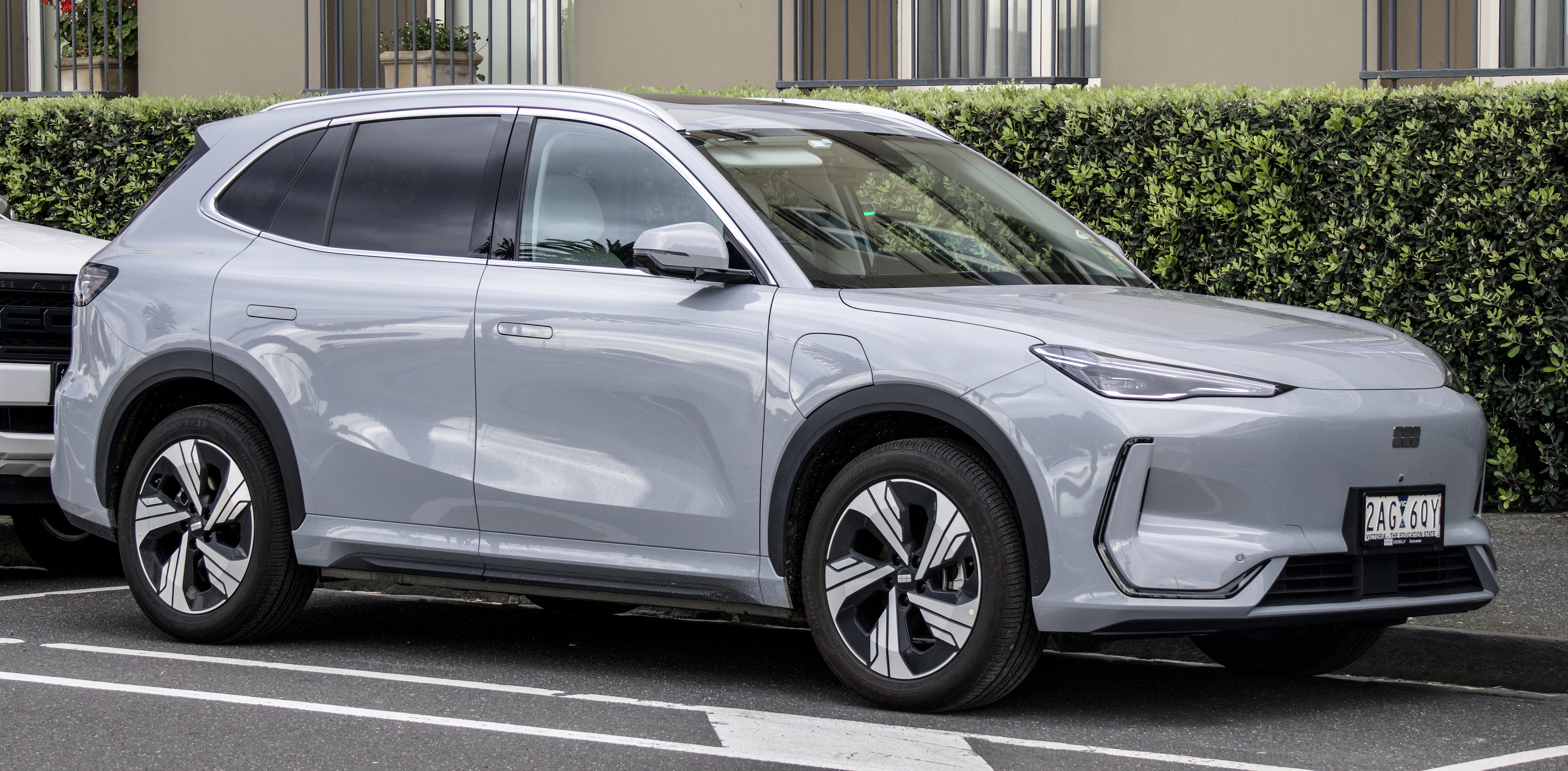
A Geely EX5 in Australia

In February 2023, Geely Auto unveiled its mass-market new energy vehicle product line, the Geely Galaxy. The first product of this series is the Geely Galaxy L7 plug-in hybrid SUV which uses the NordThor E-Hybrid 8848 powertrain, along with the innovative Galaxy N-OS technology. Geely Auto reached its record sales in 2023, selling more than 1.6 million vehicles.

==== 2024 restructuring ====
In November 2024, Geely Holding Group refined the equity structures of its subsidiaries as part of a broader restructuring strategy. Geely transferred its 11.3% stake in Zeekr Intelligent Technology (Zeekr) to Geely Automobile Holdings (Geely Auto), increasing Geely Auto's ownership in Zeekr to 62.8%. Zeekr then acquired a 20% stake in Lynk & Co from Geely Auto for 3.6 billion yuan and an additional 30% from Volvo Cars for 5.4 billion yuan, securing a 51% majority stake in Lynk & Co while Geely Auto retained 49%. Additionally, the electric pickup brand Radar Auto (Riddara) and Livan was integrated into Geely Auto.

In July 2025, Geely Auto officially signed a merger agreement with Zeekr, where Geely Auto would acquire all remaining Zeekr shares it does not already own, making Zeekr a wholly owned subsidiary of Geely Auto.

In October 2026, Geely Auto announced its planned entry to the Canadian market by 2027, following the abolishment of a 100 percent tariff for vehicles imported from China.

In October 2026, Bestway Group launched Bestway Automotive as the sole authorised distributor of Geely Auto in Pakistan. The launch followed Bestway Group’s acquisition of Proton Holdings’ plant at Port Qasim, Karachi, for vehicle assembly. The launch featured three models: the Geely EX2, the Geely EX5 and the Geely Starray EM-i.

== Assembly plants ==
As of 2025, Geely Auto controls 10 manufacturing plants, all located in mainland China, with a total annual capacity of 2.11 million vehicles.

| Plant name | Location | Annual capacity (vehicles) | Products |
|---|---|---|---|
| Chunxiao | Zhenhai, Ningbo, Zhejiang, China | 200,000 | Boyue, Boyue L |
| Xiangtan | Xiangtan, Hunan, China | 300,000 | Binyue, Xingyuan/EX2 |
| Baoji | Baoji, Shaanxi, China | 200,000 | Galaxy L7, Boyue, Boyue L |
| Linhai | Linhai, Zhejiang, China | 300,000 | Galaxy L6, Emgrand L, Galaxy Starship 7 |
| Jinzhong | Jinzhong, Shanxi, China | 180,000 | Geometry A, Geometry C |
| Qiantang | Qiantang, Hangzhou, China | 100,000 | Galaxy E8, Geometry E, Icon/Cowboy |
| Hangzhou Bay DMA | Hangzhou Bay, Ningbo, Zhejiang, China | 150,000 | Xingyue S, Xingrui, Xingrui L |
| Guiyang | Guiyang, Guizhou, China | 200,000 | Galaxy E5/EX5, Haoyue L |
| Changxing | Changxing, Huzhou, Zhejiang, China | 180,000 | New Emgrand, Binrui Cool, Smart #5 |
| Xi'an | Xi'an, Shaanxi, China | 300,000 | Xingyue L, Smart #1, Smart #3 |

== Brands and models ==
Geely Automobile Holdings owns the main Geely Auto brand and its sub-brand Geely Galaxy. The company partly owns Lynk & Co, Proton Cars, Radar Auto, London EV Company and Zeekr brands, and a former owner of joint venture brand Livan Automotive. The brands formerly used by the company include Geely Geometry, Emgrand, Englon, and Gleagle.

=== Geely Auto ===
Geely Auto
- Logo used since 2023
- Product type: Automotive
- Current owner: Geely
- Country: China
- Introduced: 1997
- Markets: Worldwide
- Website: geely.com

Chinese name
- Simplified Chinese: 吉利汽车
- Hanyu Pinyin: Jílì Qìchē

Geely is the main brand of the company. The brand mostly sells petrol-powered cars, with several hybrid and battery electric offering.

==== Cars ====
- Geely Emgrand (2010–present), compact sedan
- Geely Emgrand L (2019–present, export-only since 2025), compact sedan
- Geely Xingrui/Preface (2020–present), mid-size sedan
- Geely Xingrui L Plus (2026–present), mid-size sedan
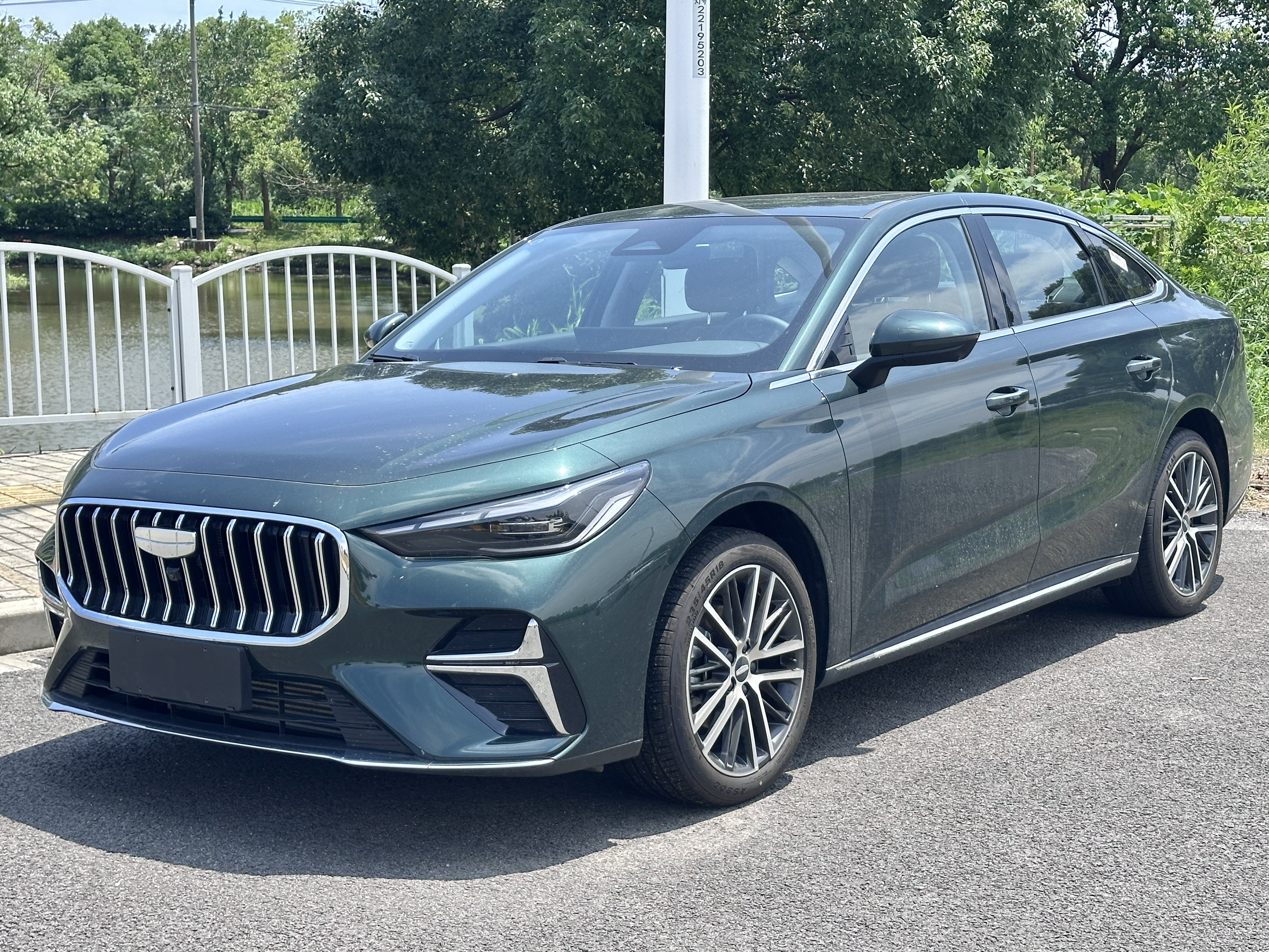
Geely Emgrand

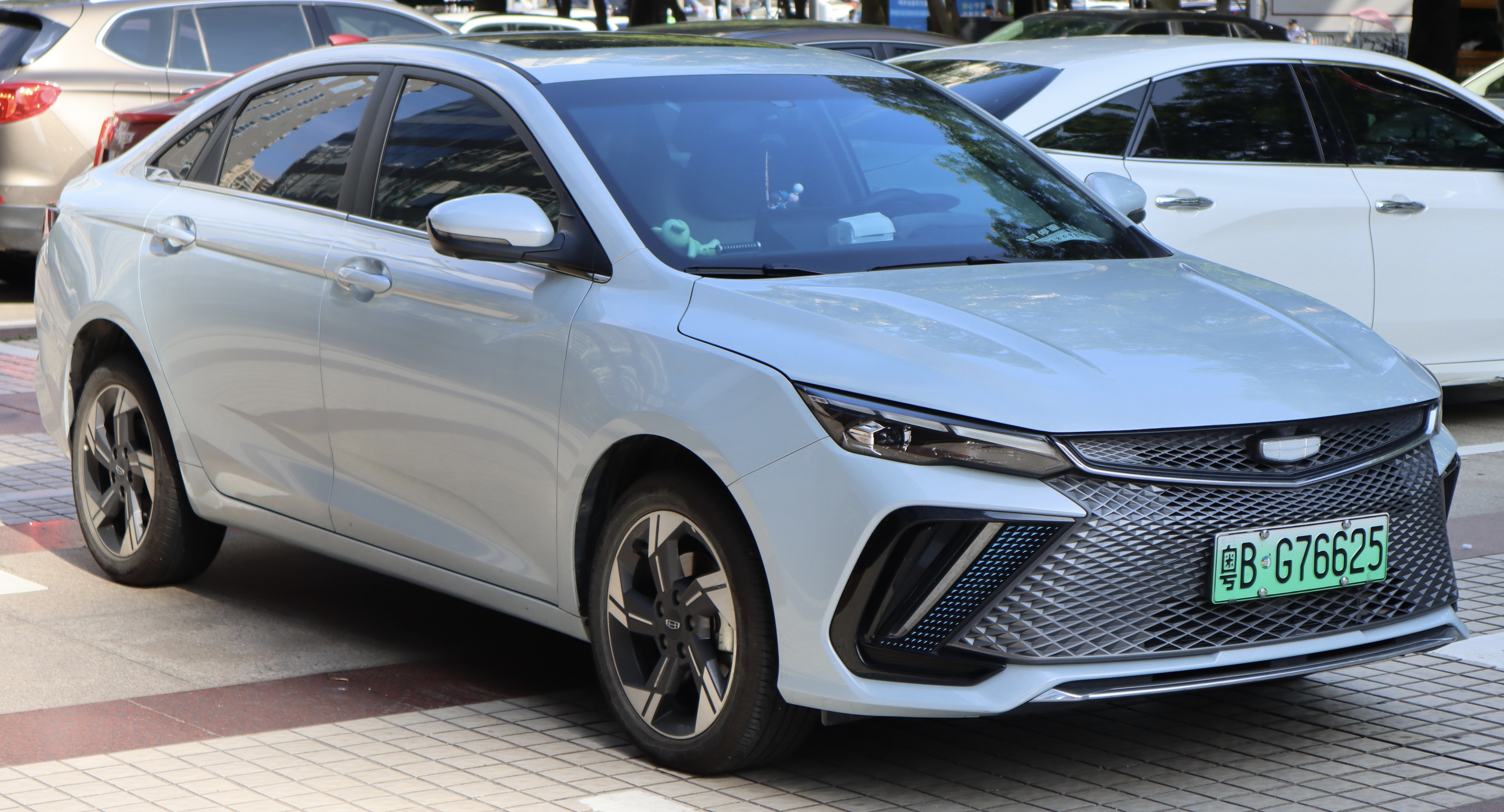
Geely Emgrand L

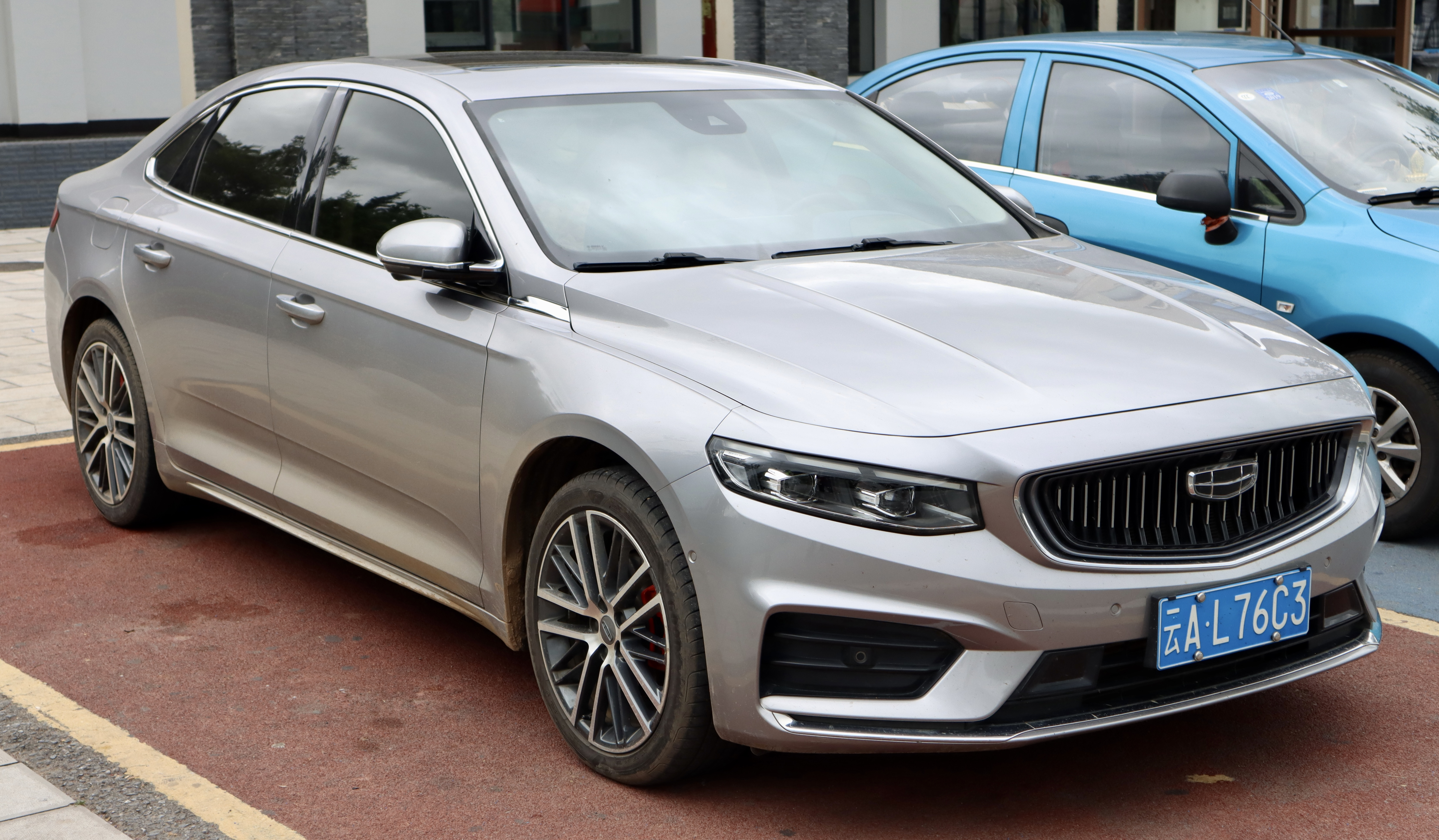
Geely Xingrui/Preface

Geely Xingrui L Plus

==== SUVs ====
- Geely Xingyue L / Monjaro (2021–present), mid-size SUV
- Geely Xingyue S / Tugella (2019–present, export-only since 2023), compact coupe SUV
- Geely Haoyue/Okavango (2020–present), mid-size SUV
- Geely Boyue/Atlas/Azkarra (2016–present), compact SUV
- Geely Boyue/Cityray (2023–present), compact SUV
- Geely Boyue L / Starray / Atlas (2023–present), compact SUV
- Geely Boyue REV (2026–present), compact coupe SUV, EREV variant of Livan 7
- Geely Binyue/Coolray (2018–present), subcompact SUV
- Geely Icon/Cowboy (2020–present), subcompact SUV
- Geely Vision X3/GX3 Pro (2017–present, export-only since 2023), subcompact SUV
- Geely Haoyue Pro (2024–present, export-only since 2025), compact SUV
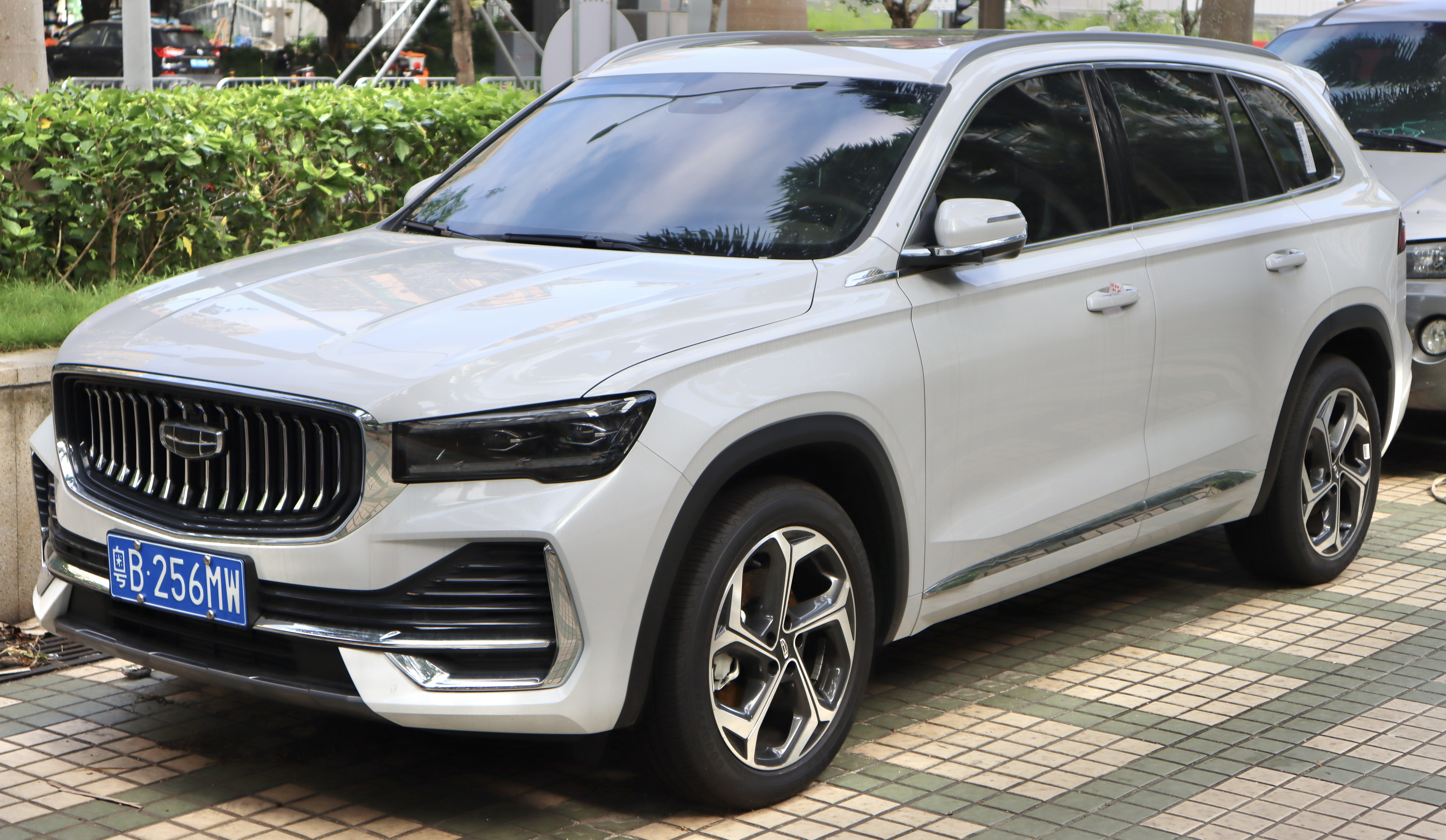
Geely Xingyue L

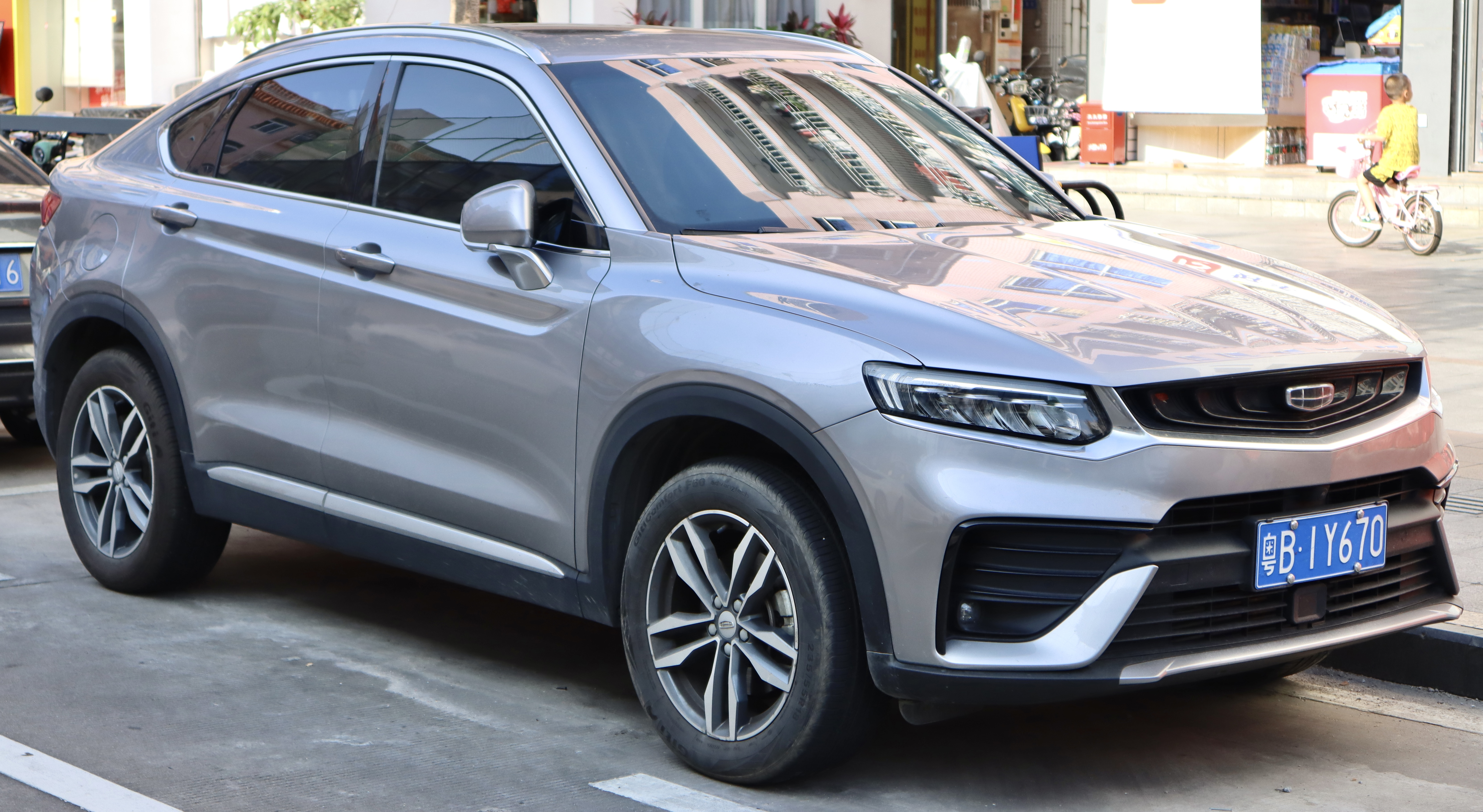
Geely Xingyue S

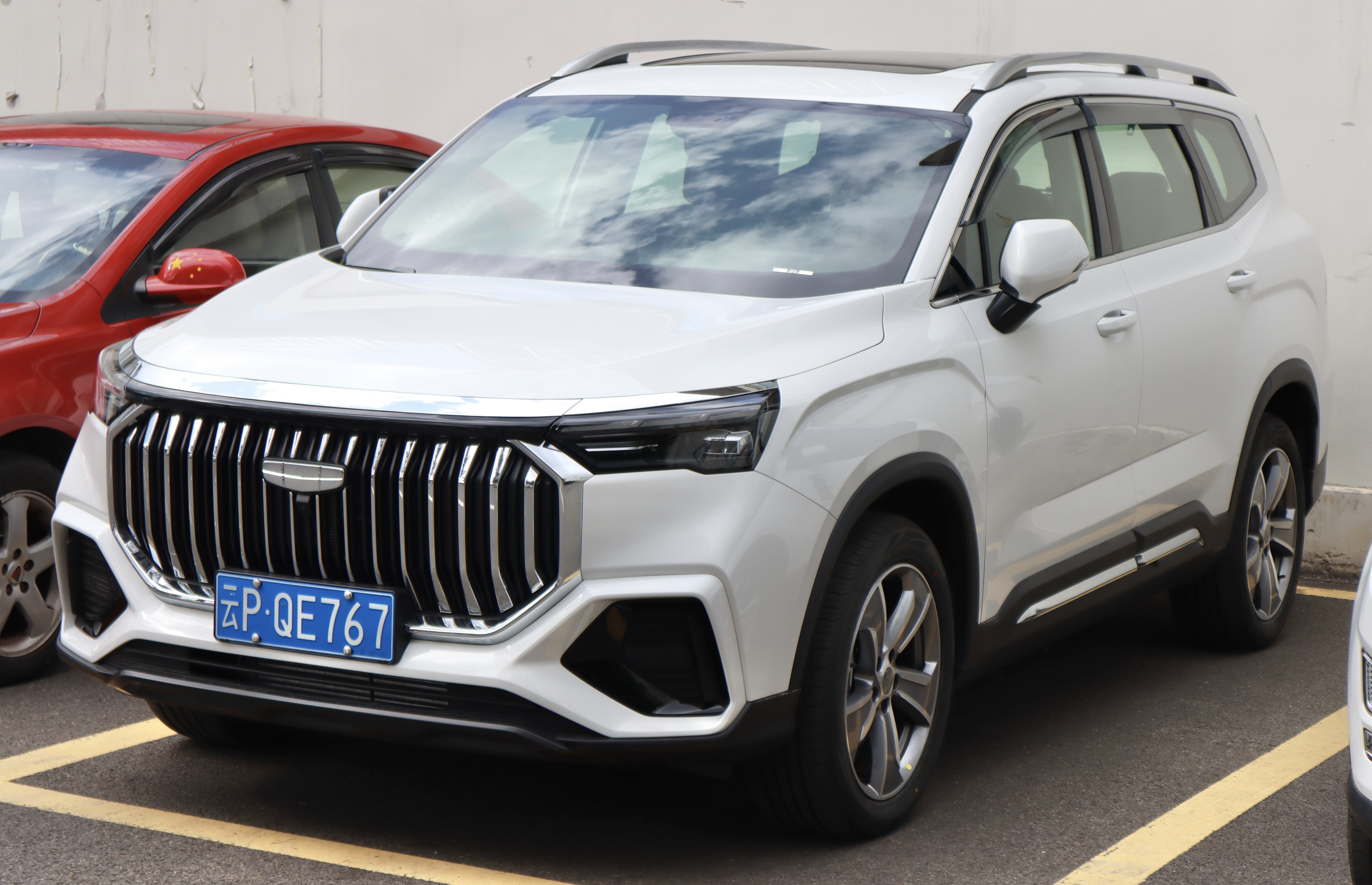
Geely Haoyue L

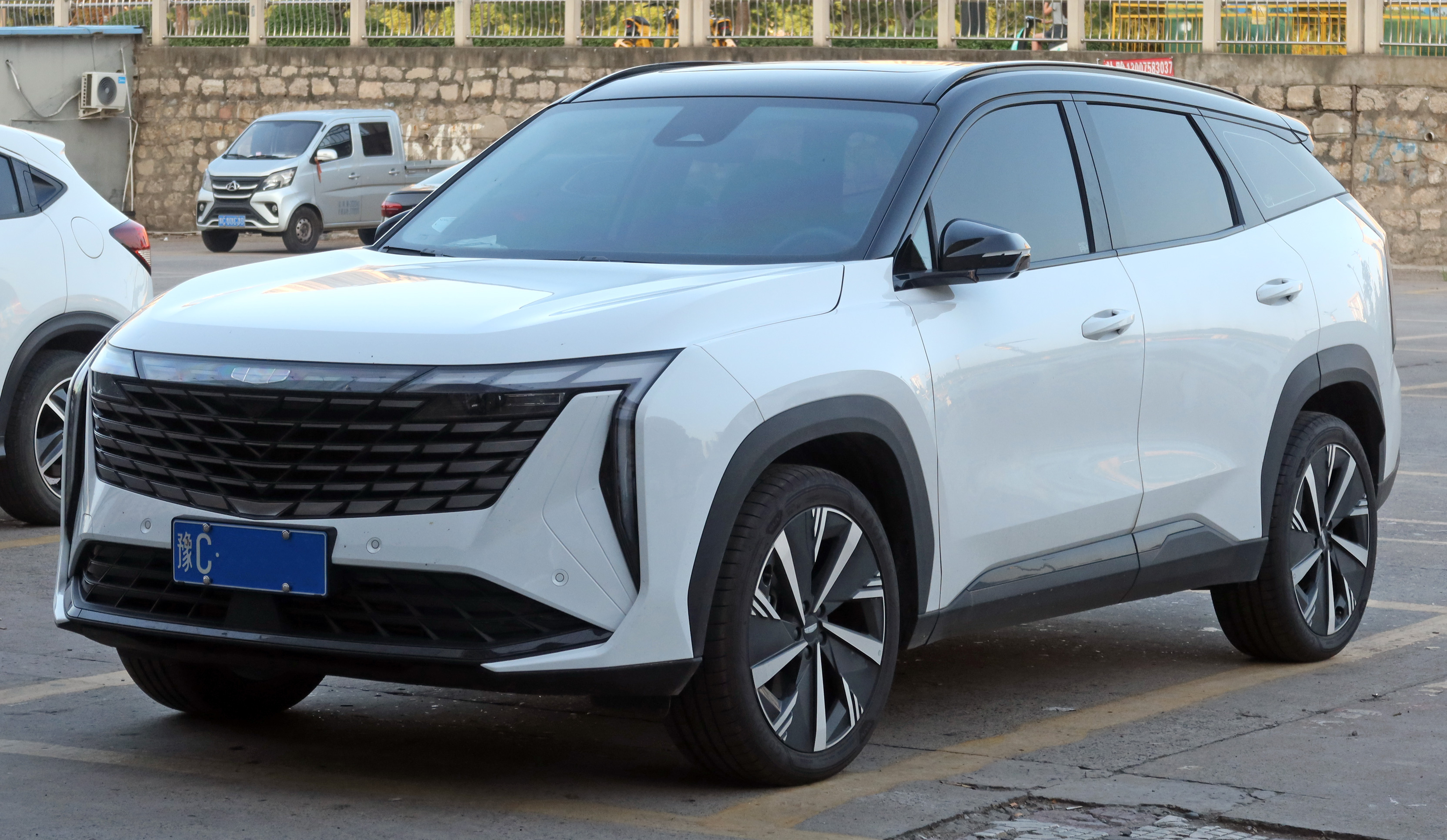
Geely Boyue L

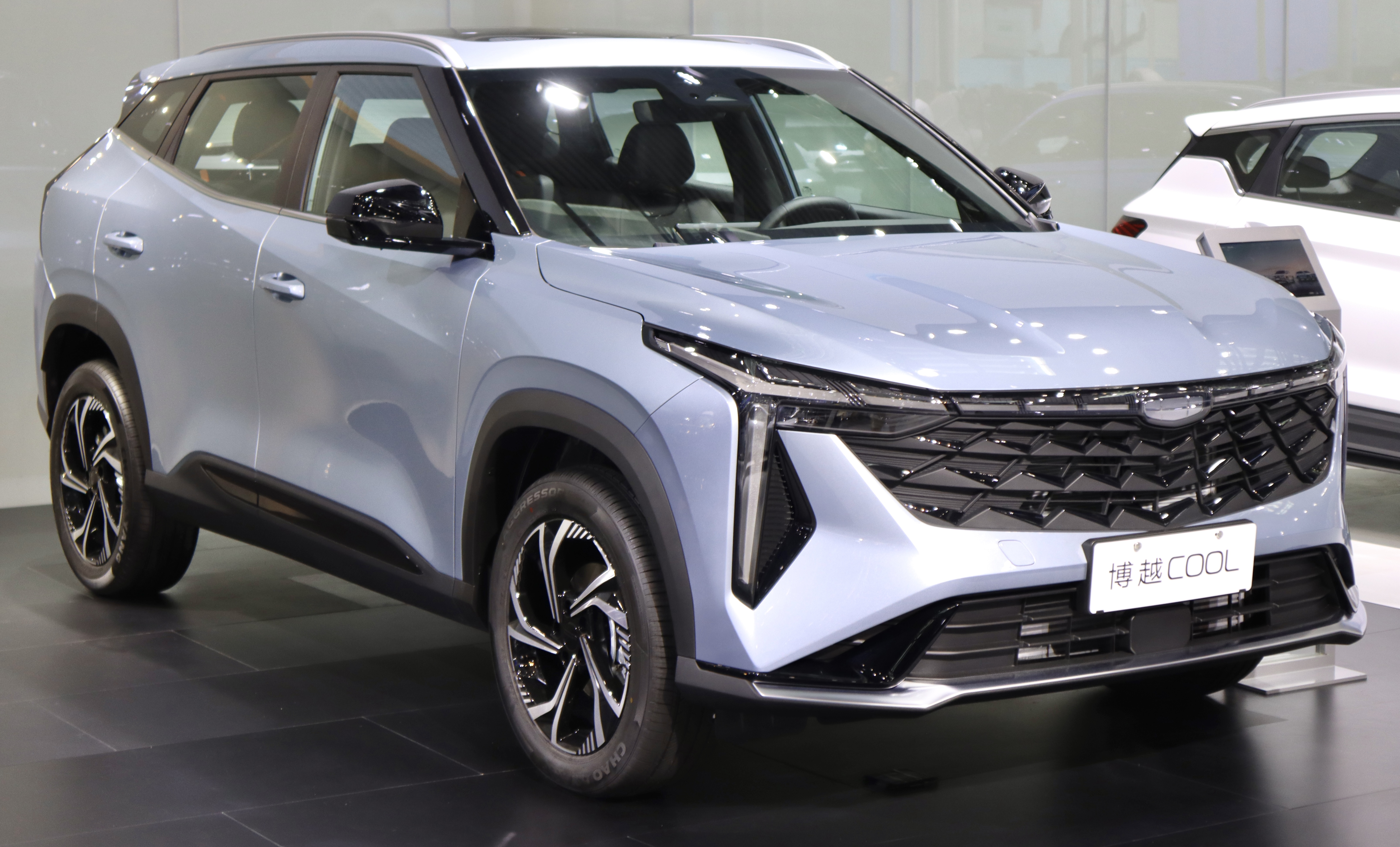
Geely Boyue

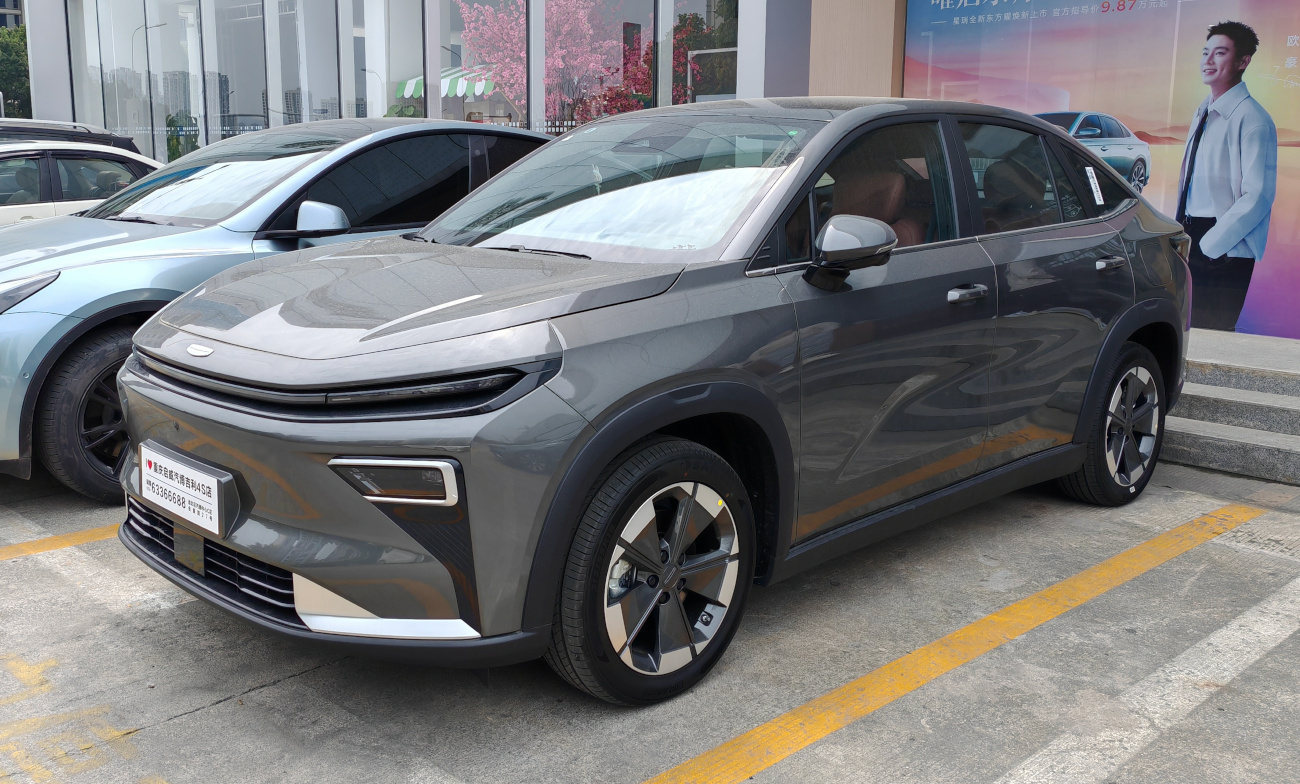
Geely Boyue REV

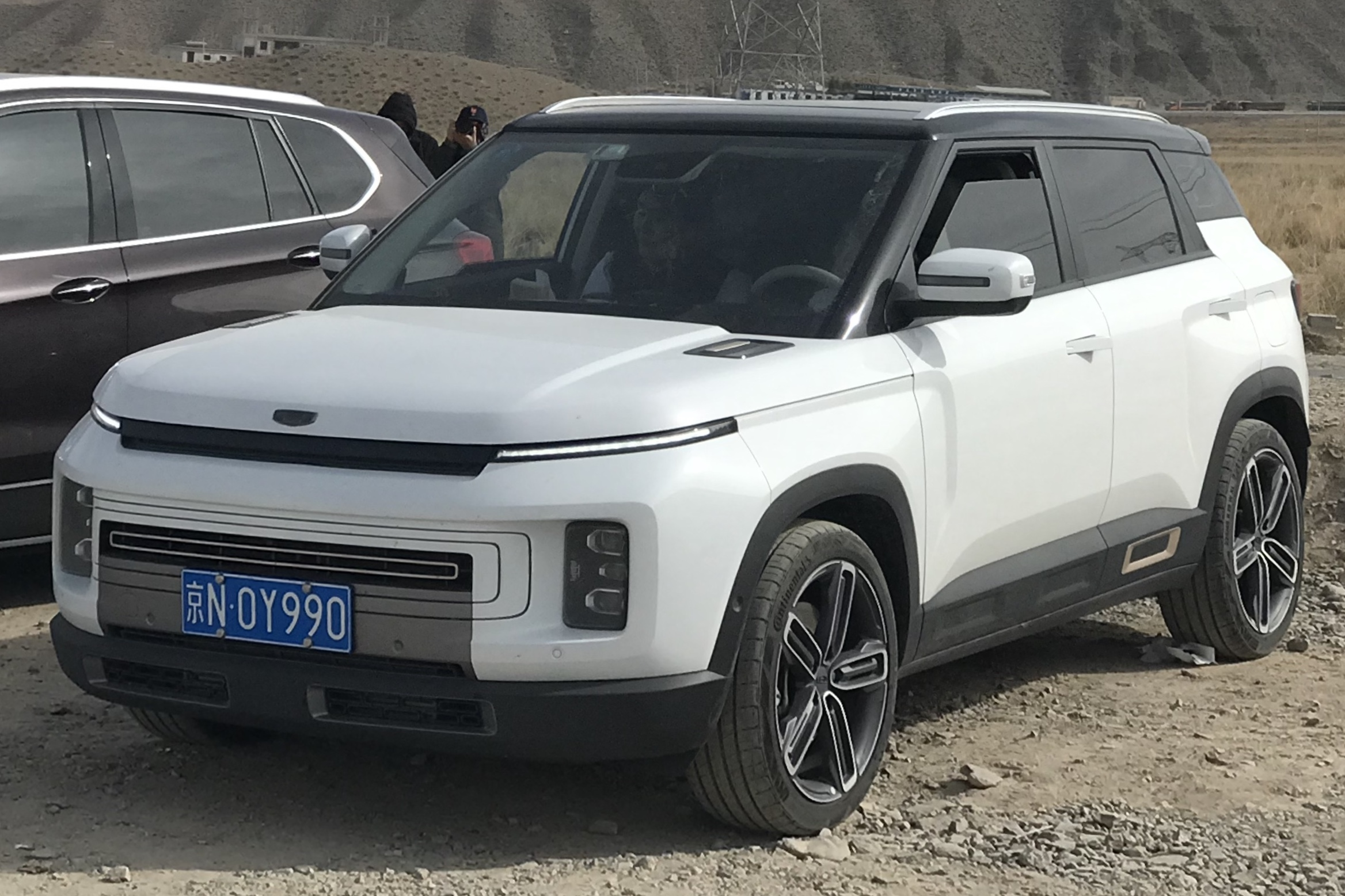
Geely Icon

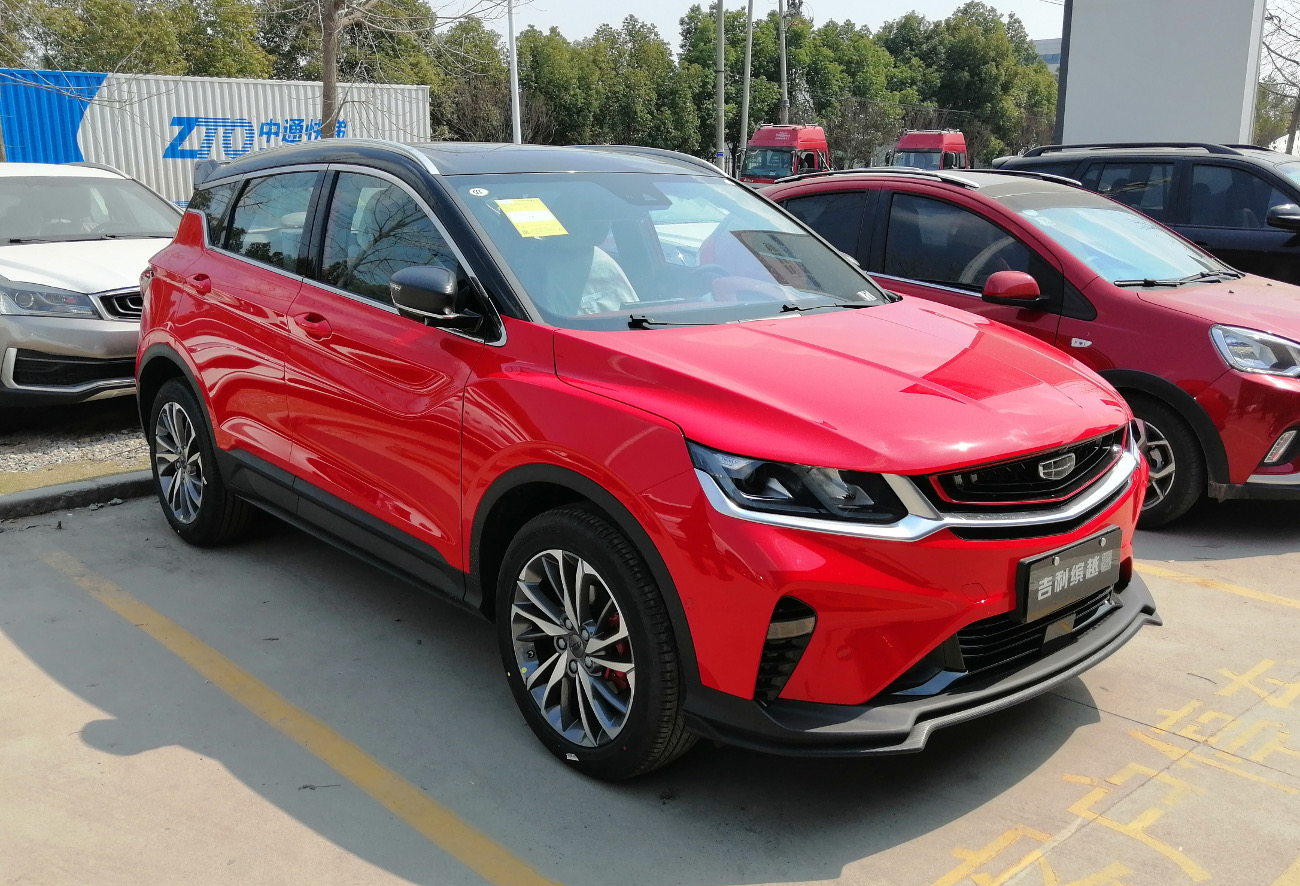
Geely Binyue

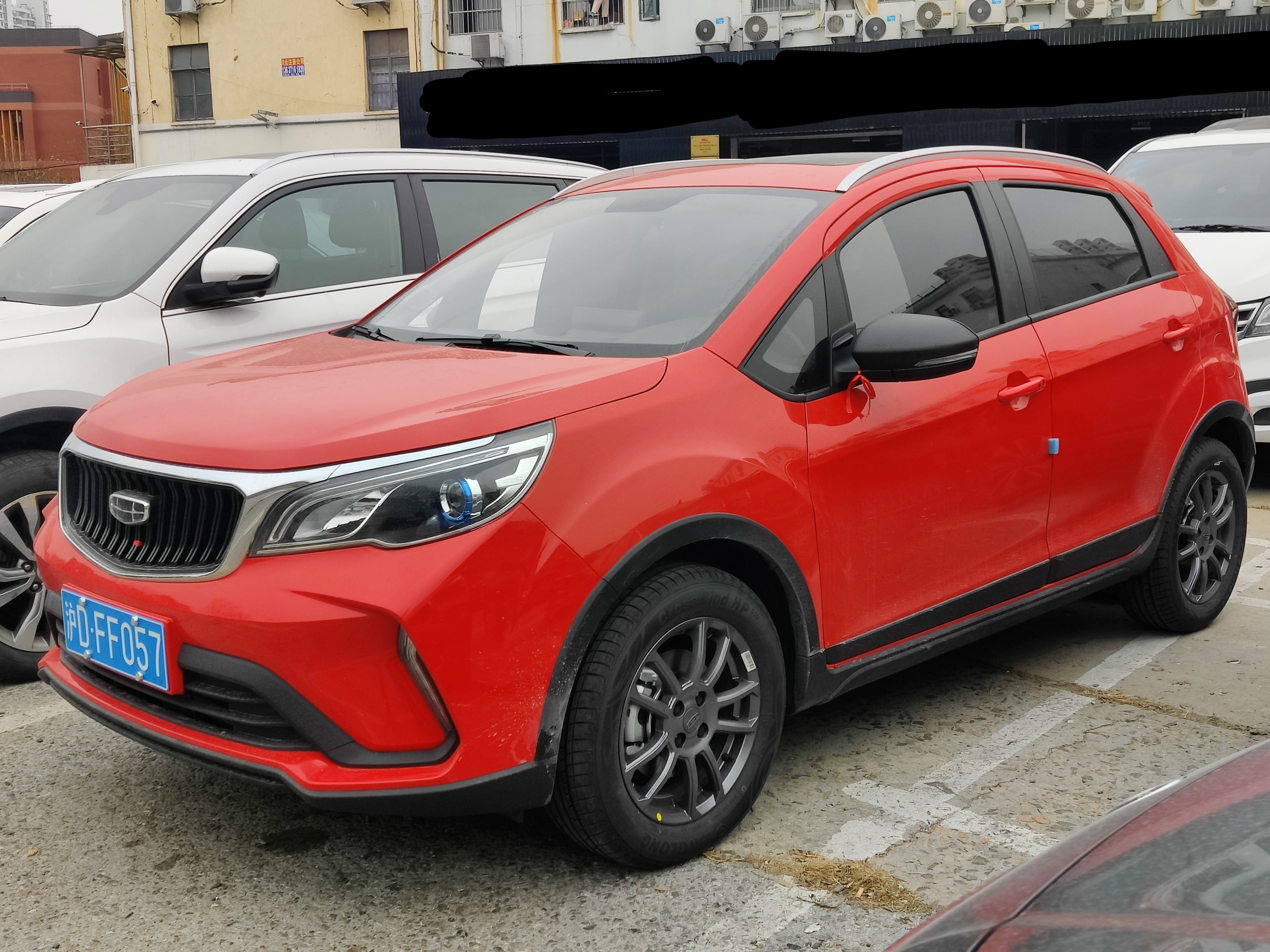
Geely Yuanjing X3

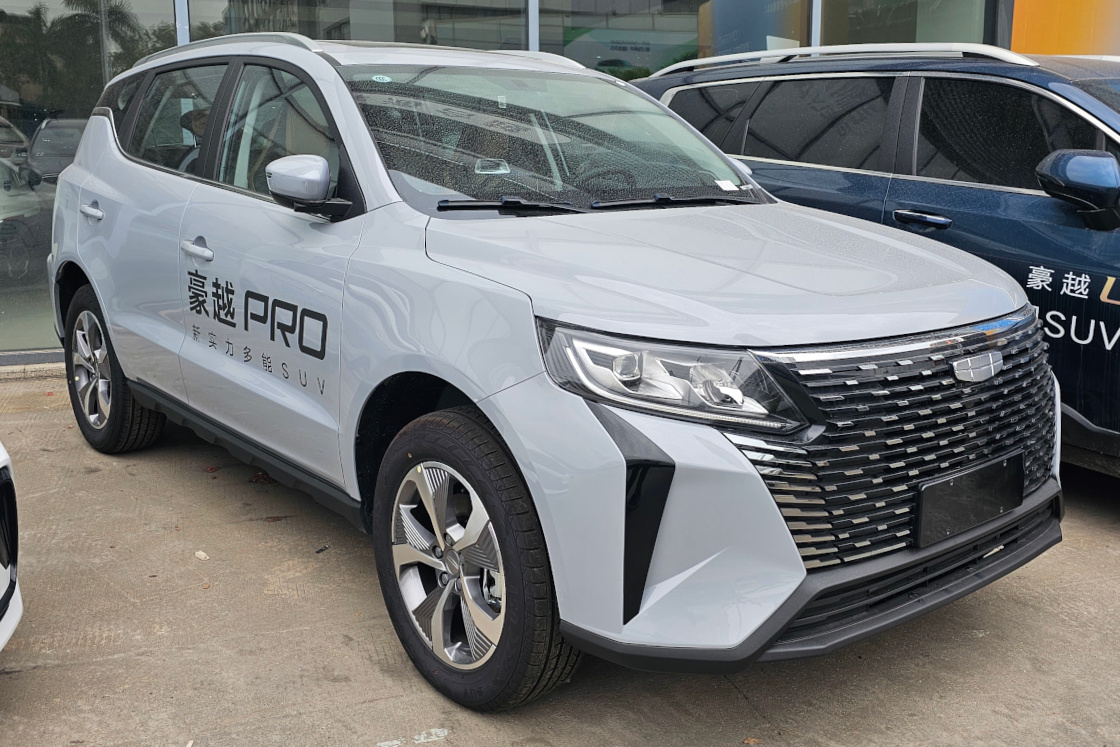
Geely Haoyue Pro

=== Geely Galaxy ===
Geely Galaxy (Chinese: 吉利银河; pinyin: Jílì Yínhé) was originally Geely's product line of new energy vehicles (plug-in hybrid and battery electric vehicles) that was established in February 2023. In October 2024, the Geely Geometry line was merged with Geely Galaxy. In March 2025, Geely Galaxy was upgraded into an independent brand.

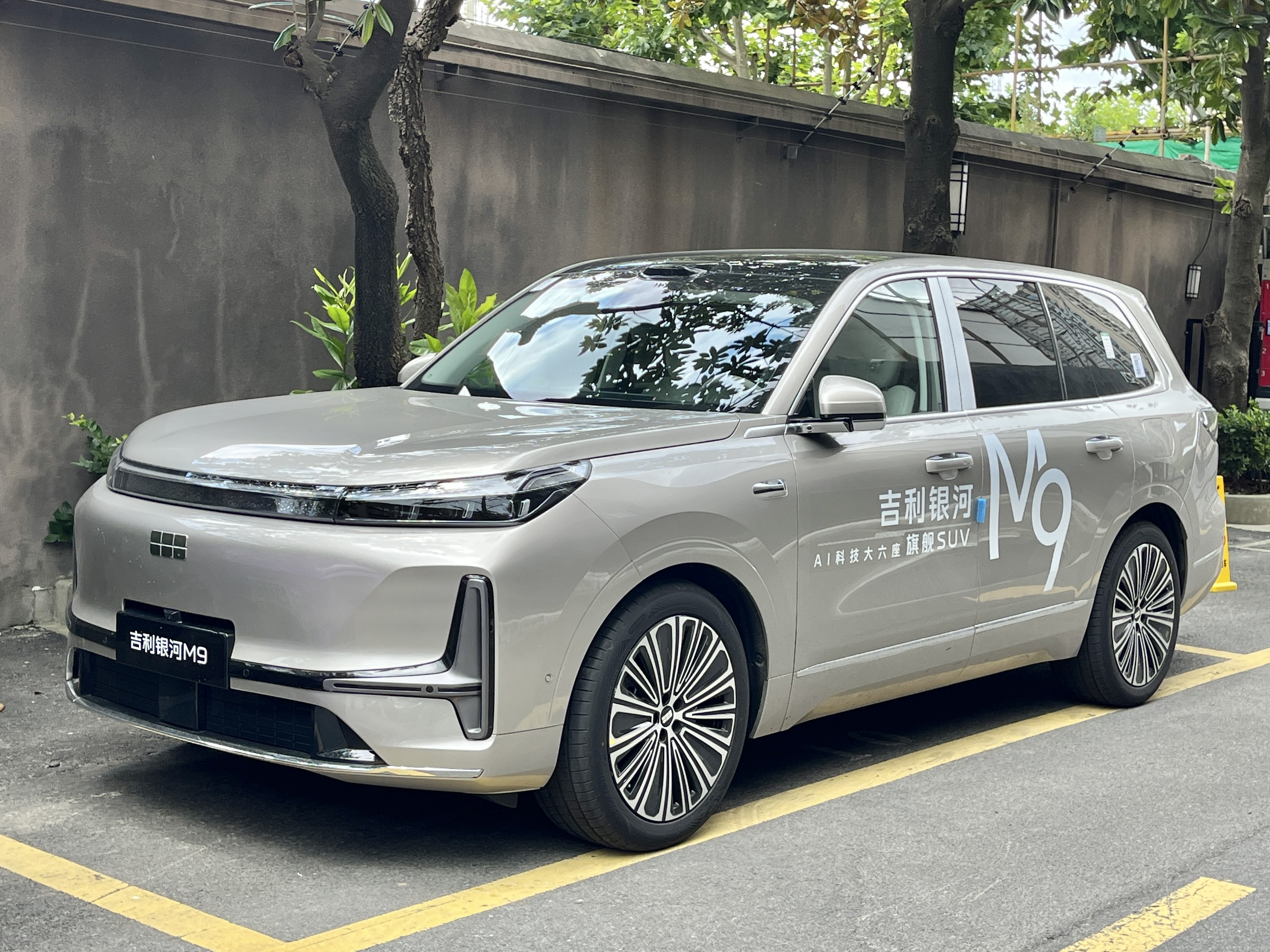
Geely Galaxy M9

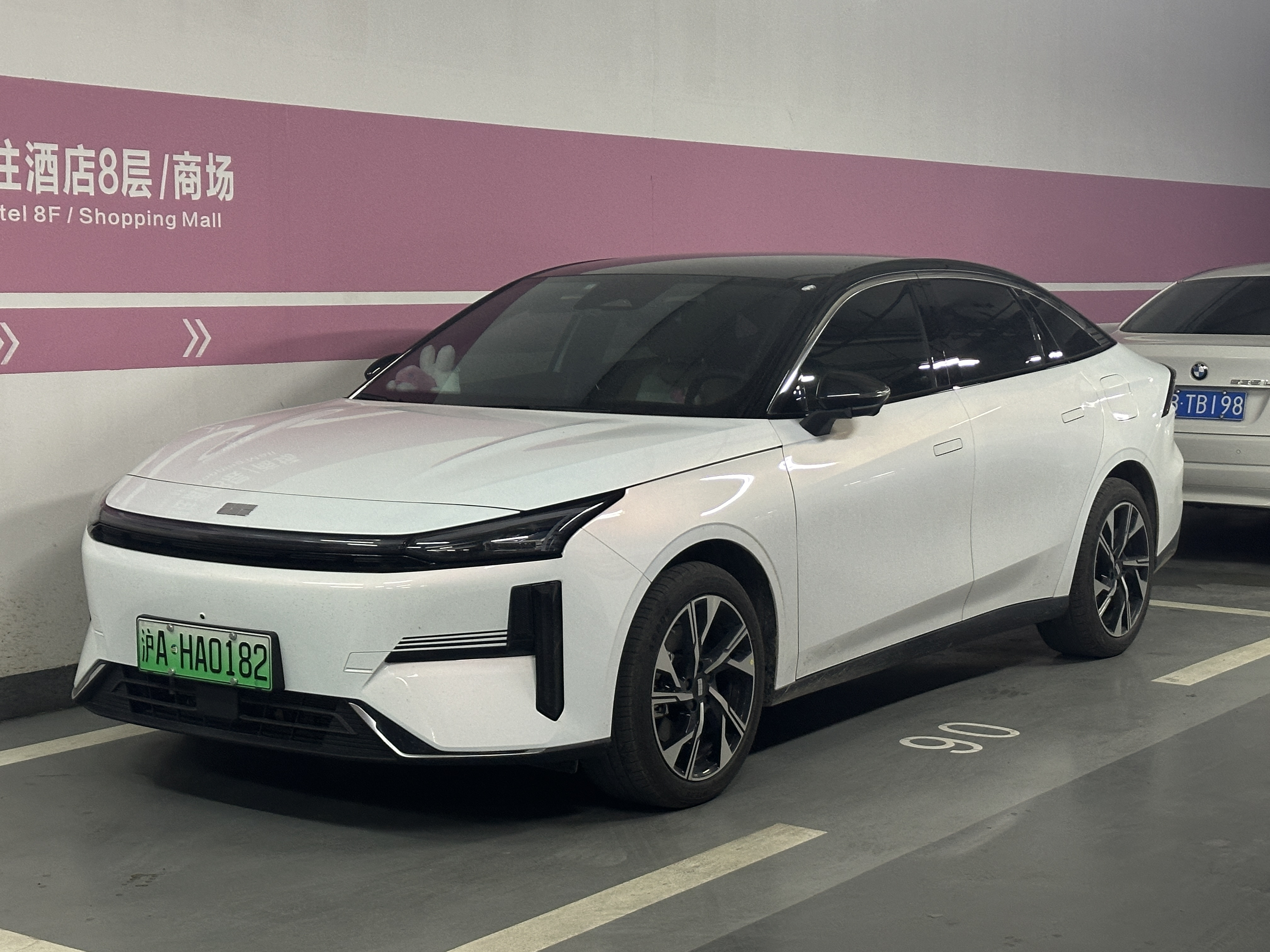
Geely Galaxy L6

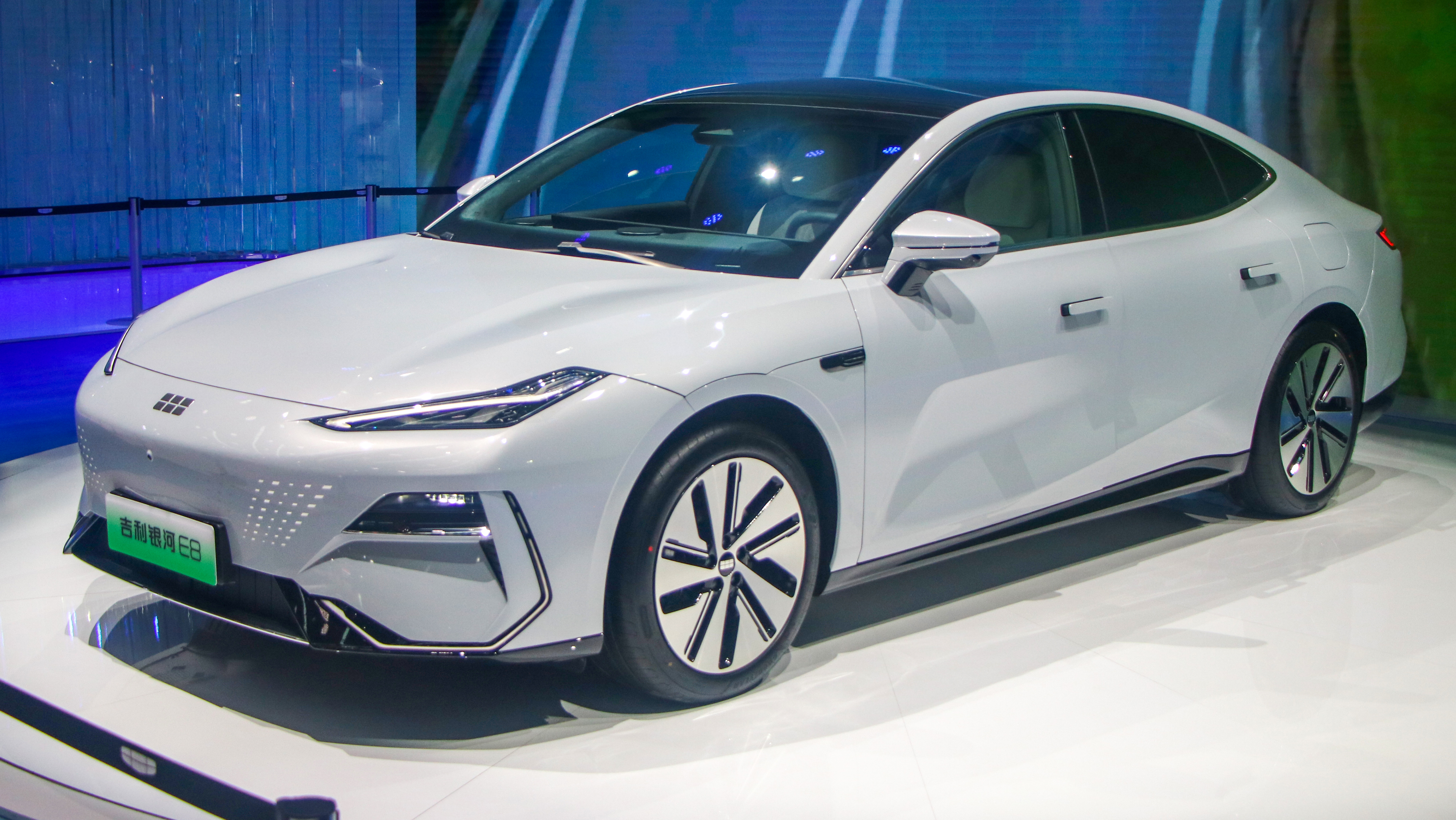
Geely Galaxy E8

=== Proton ===
Proton is a national car brand of Malaysia that is partly managed by Geely Automobile Holdings. Since 2017, the brand is owned 49.9% by Zhejiang Geely Holding and 50.1% by DRB-HICOM. Its first Geely-based vehicle, also the carmaker's first-ever SUV, the Proton X70 was introduced in Malaysia in December 2018. It is based on first-generation Geely Boyue.

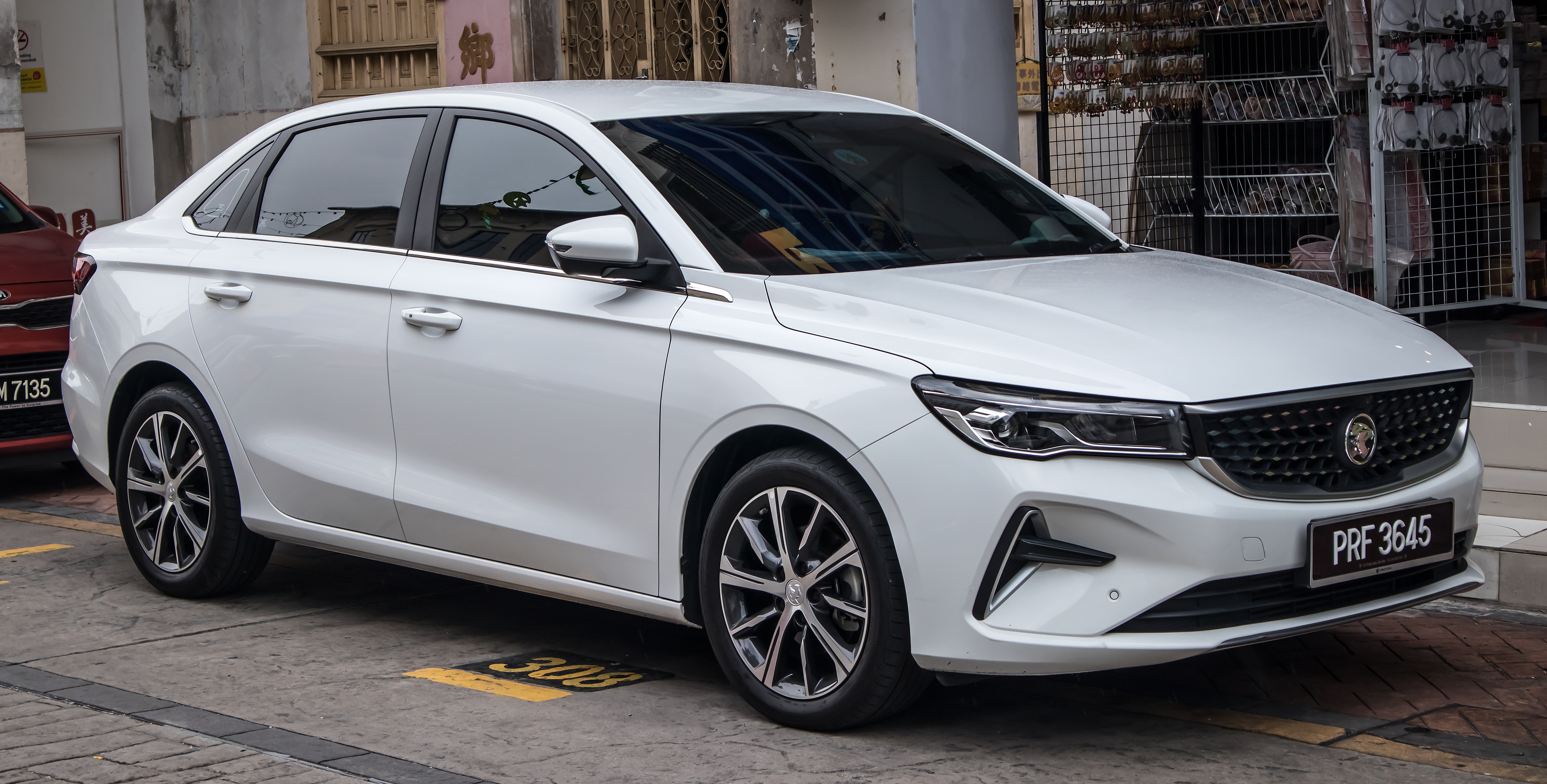
Proton S70

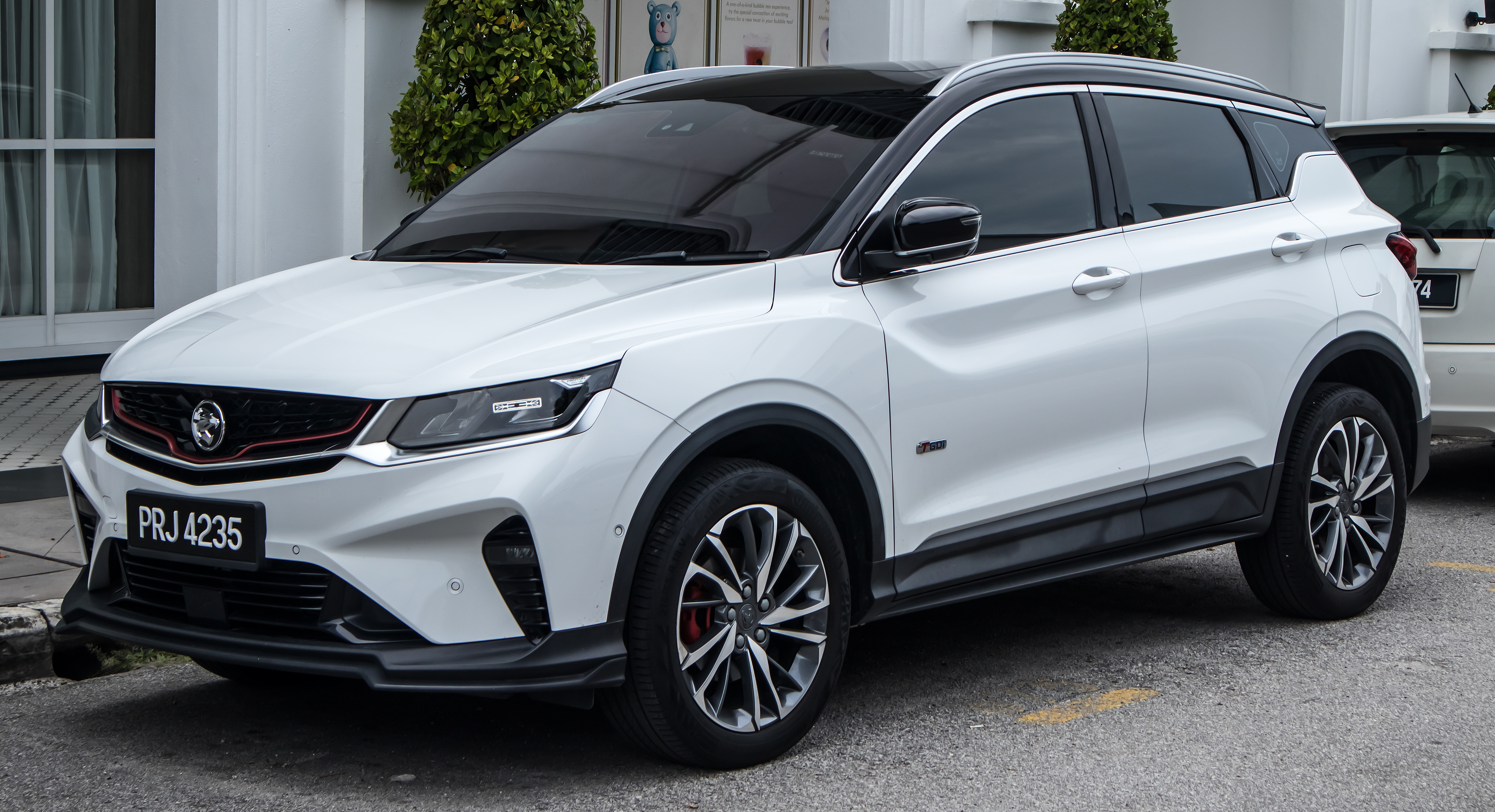
Proton X50

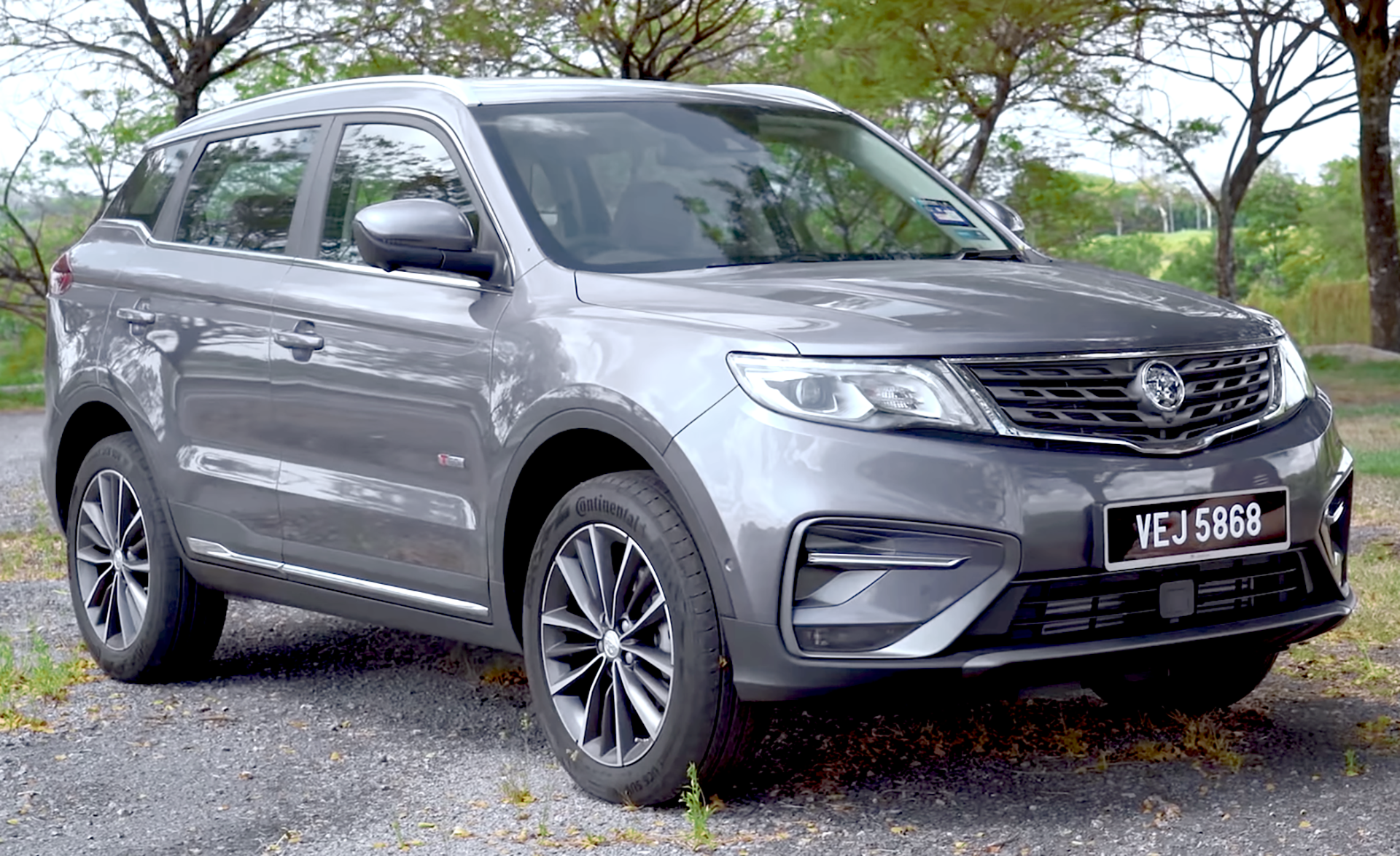
Proton X70

=== Geely Radar ===
Radar Auto (Chinese: 吉利雷达), or Riddara outside China, is a battery electric pick-up truck brand. Previously owned by Geely Holding Group, the brand was consolidated into Geely Auto in November 2024. The brand's first vehicle, the Radar RD6, was unveiled in 2022.

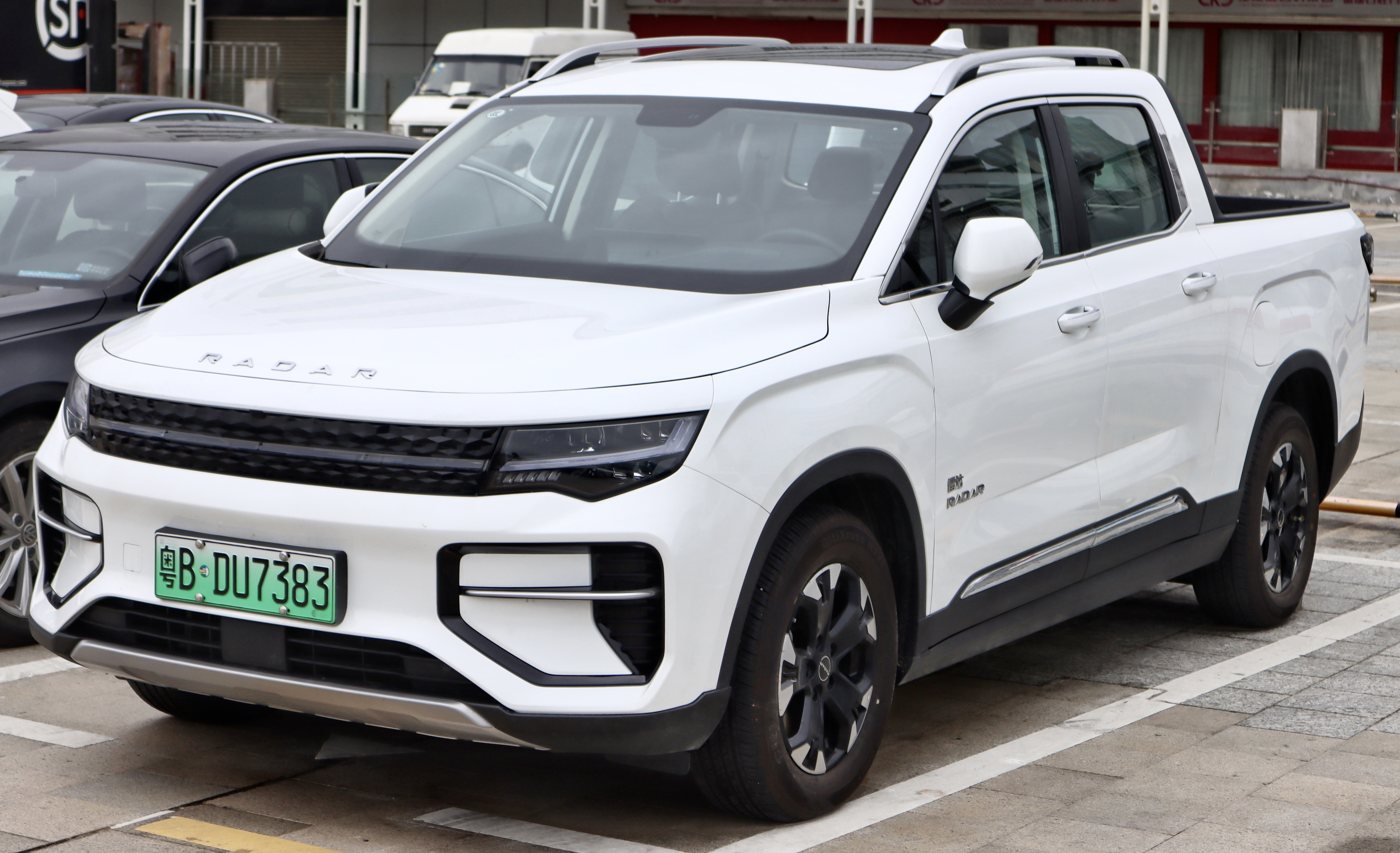
Radar Horizon

=== Zeekr ===
Zeekr (Chinese: 极氪) is a premium battery electric vehicle brand of ZGH owned by Geely Automobile Holdings. The company is listed on the New York Stock Exchange since May 2024. The brand was founded in 2021 as an offshoot of Lynk & Co, as its first vehicles were meant to be Lynk & Co models. After a major shareholding restructuring in late 2024, Zeekr holds 51% of Lynk & Co shares. The company also controls 75% of Geely's financing arm, Genius Auto Finance Co., Ltd. While it is 62.8% owned by Geely Automobile Holdings, it is not part of the Geely Auto Group business unit.

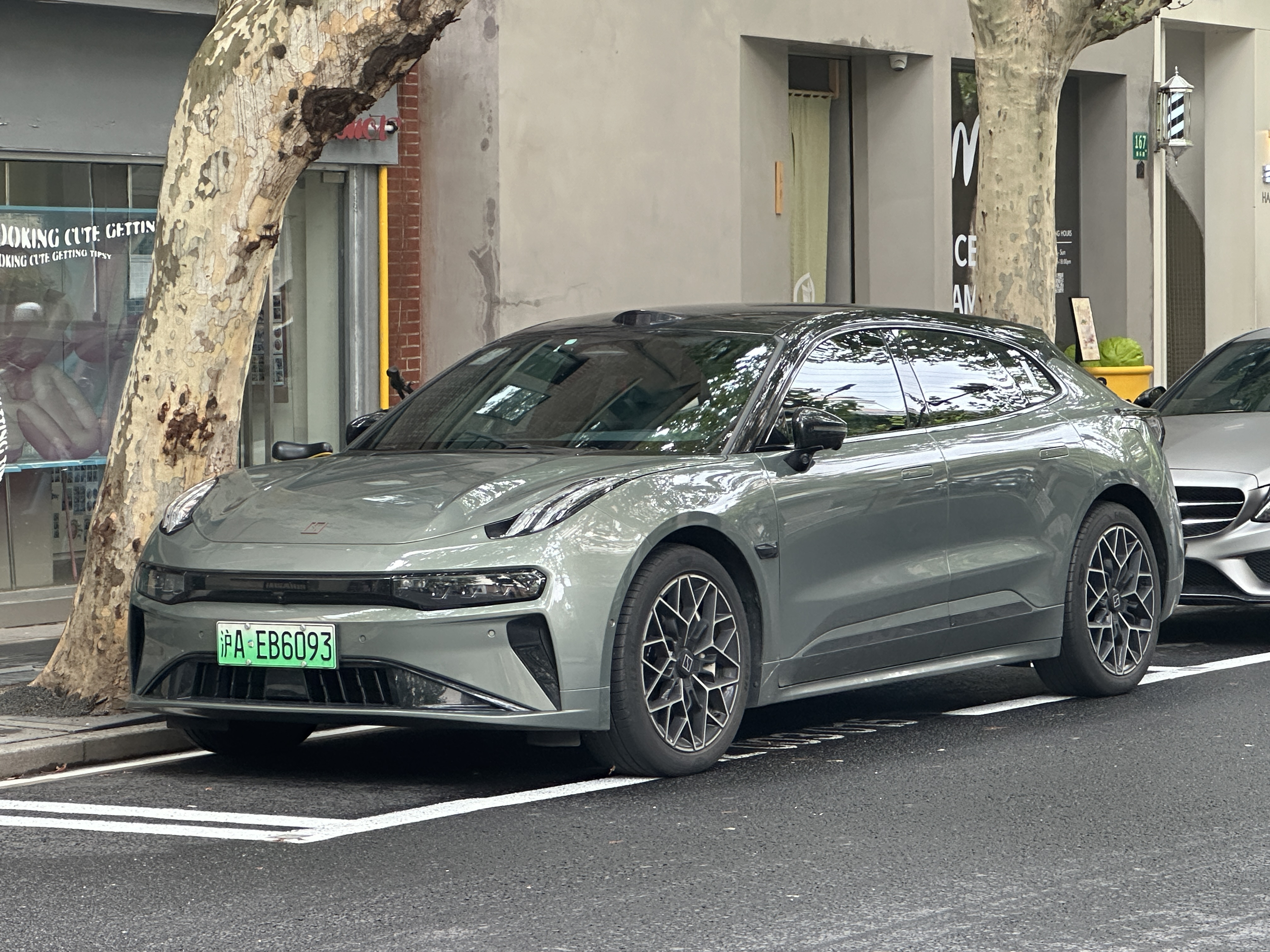
Zeekr 001

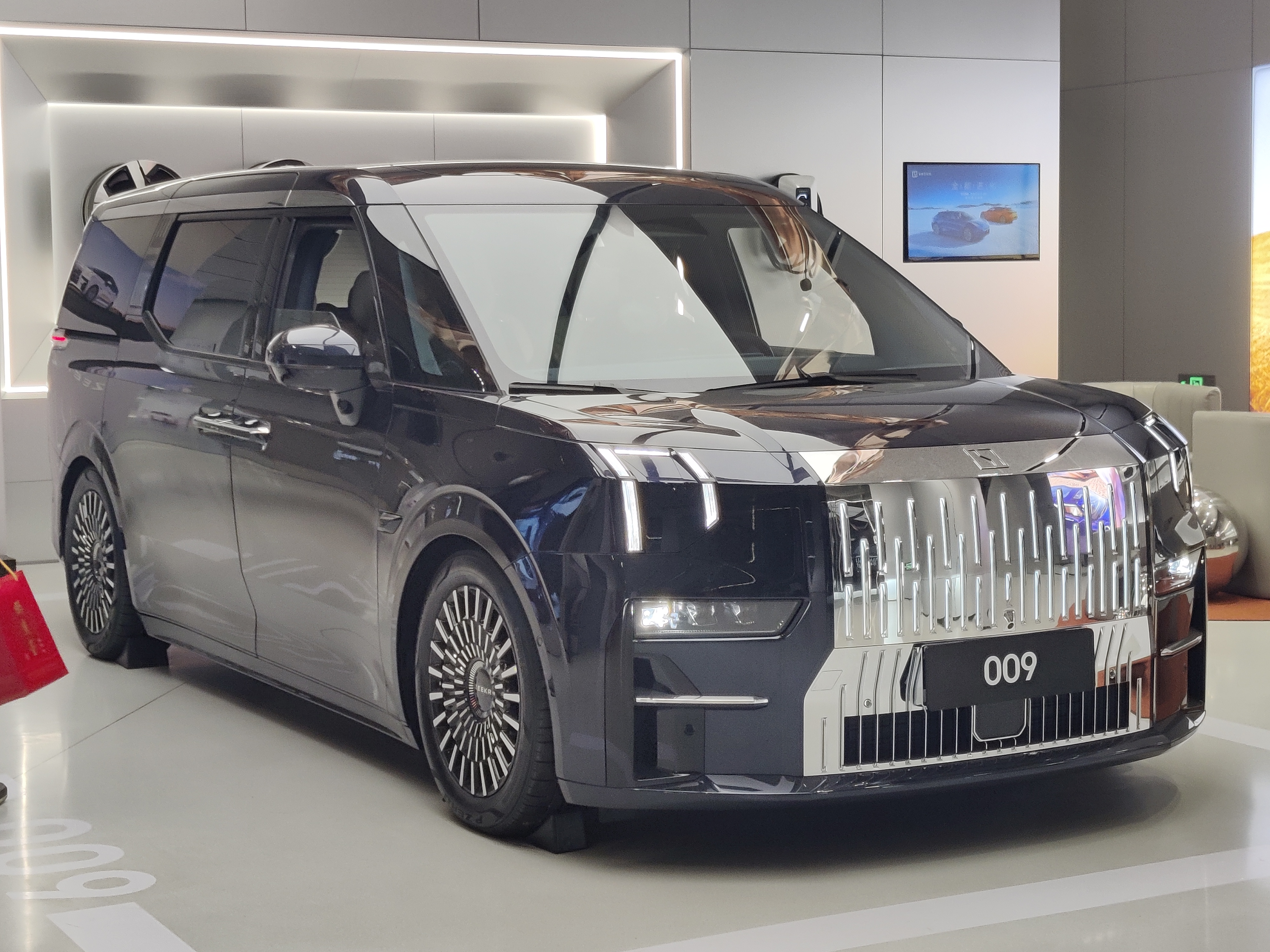
Zeekr 009

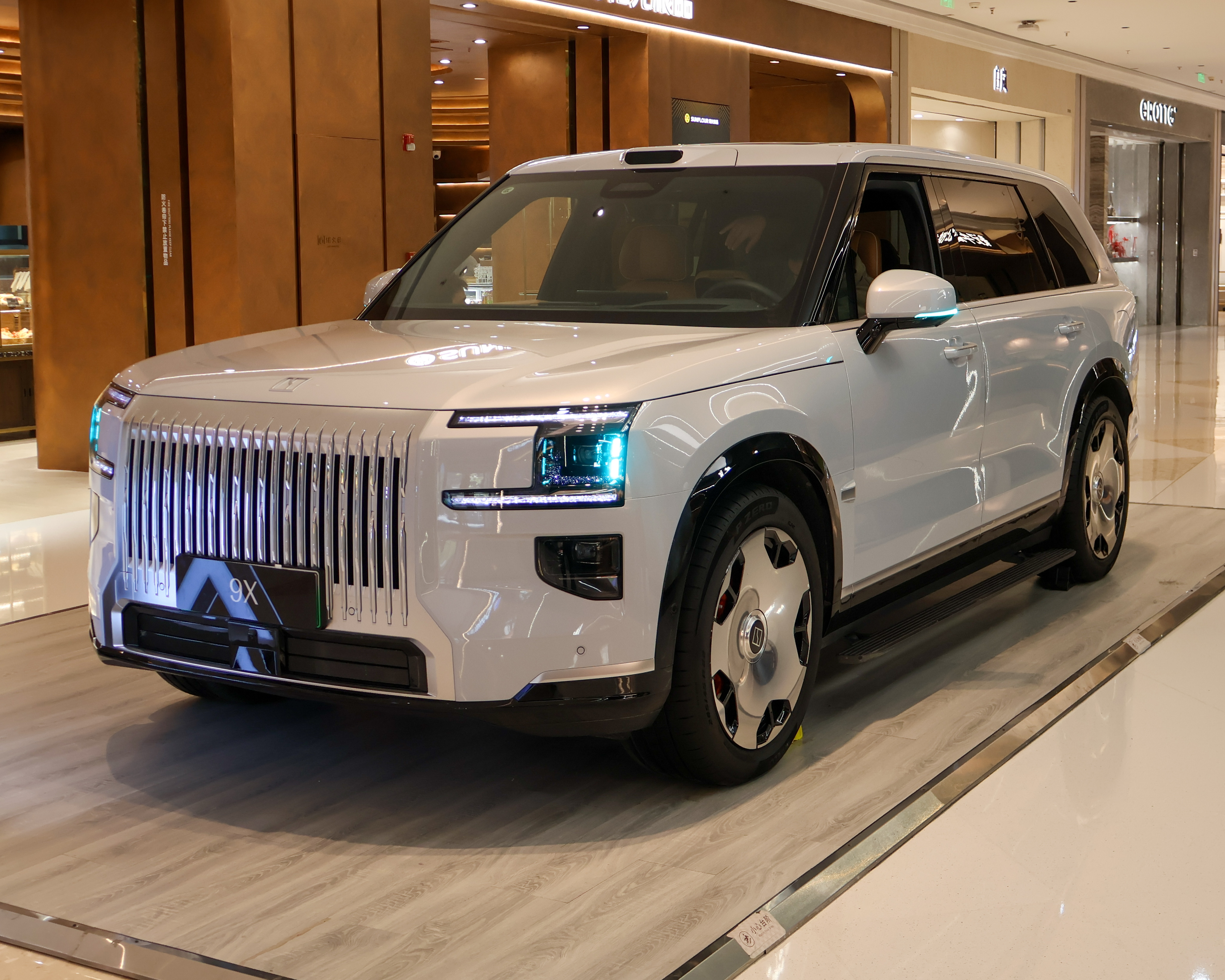
Zeekr 9X

=== Lynk & Co ===
Lynk & Co (Chinese: 领克) was established in 2017 that uses technology developed jointly by Volvo Cars and Geely Auto. Before 2024, it was owned 50% by Geely Auto, 30% by Volvo Cars, and 20% by ZGH. It currently 51% owned by Zeekr and 49% owned by Geely Auto after restructuring.

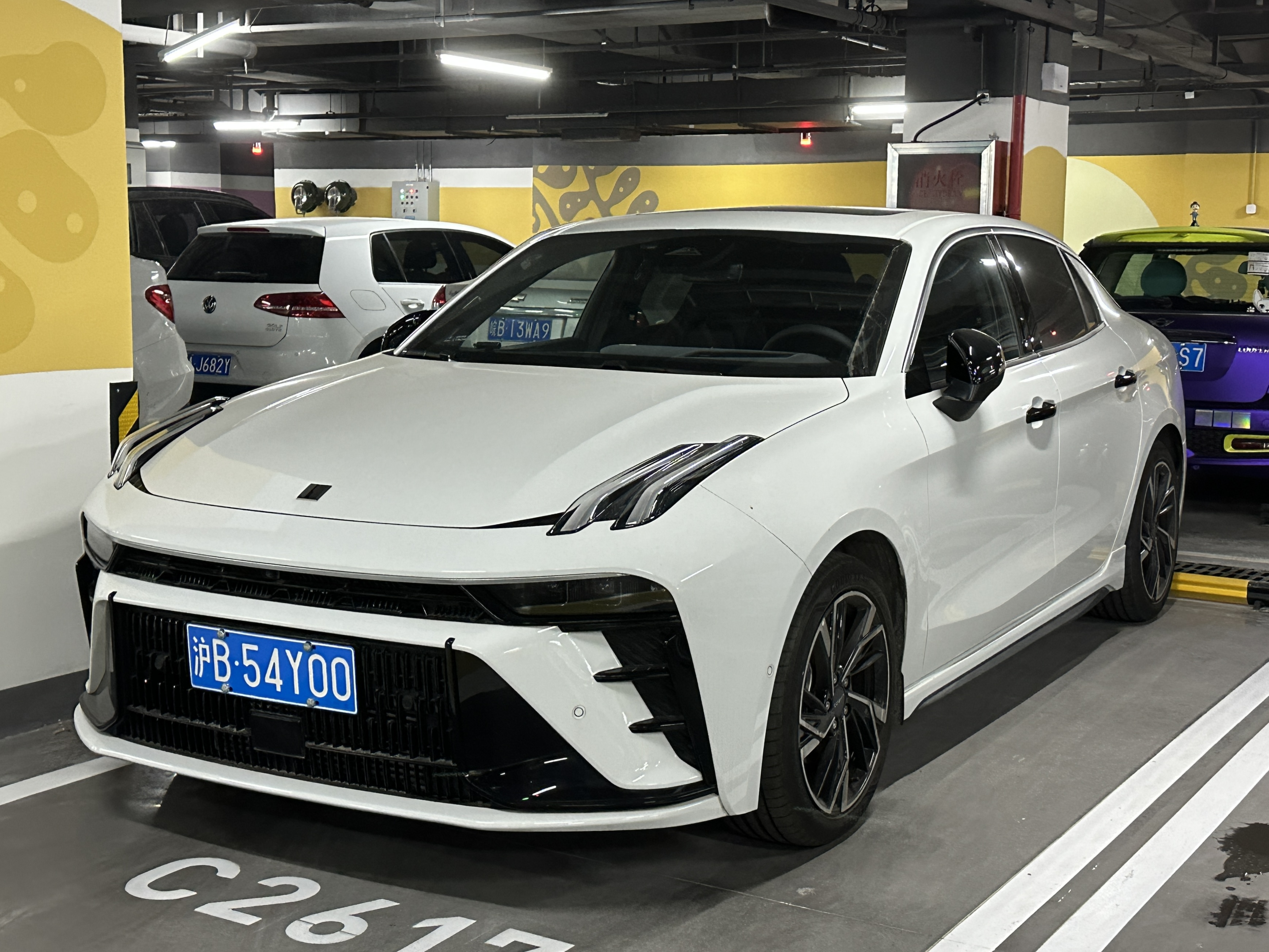
Lynk & Co 03

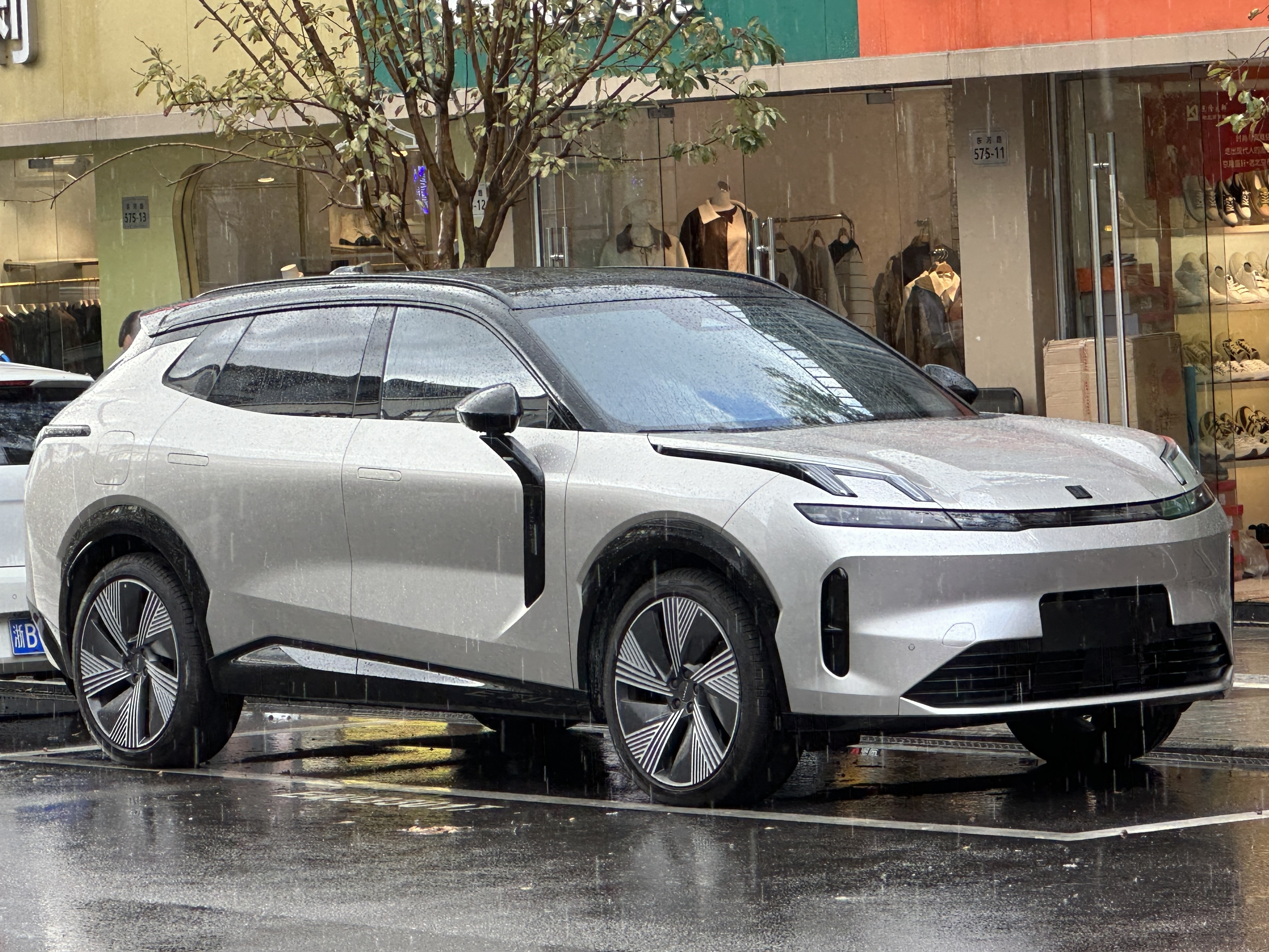
Lynk & Co 08

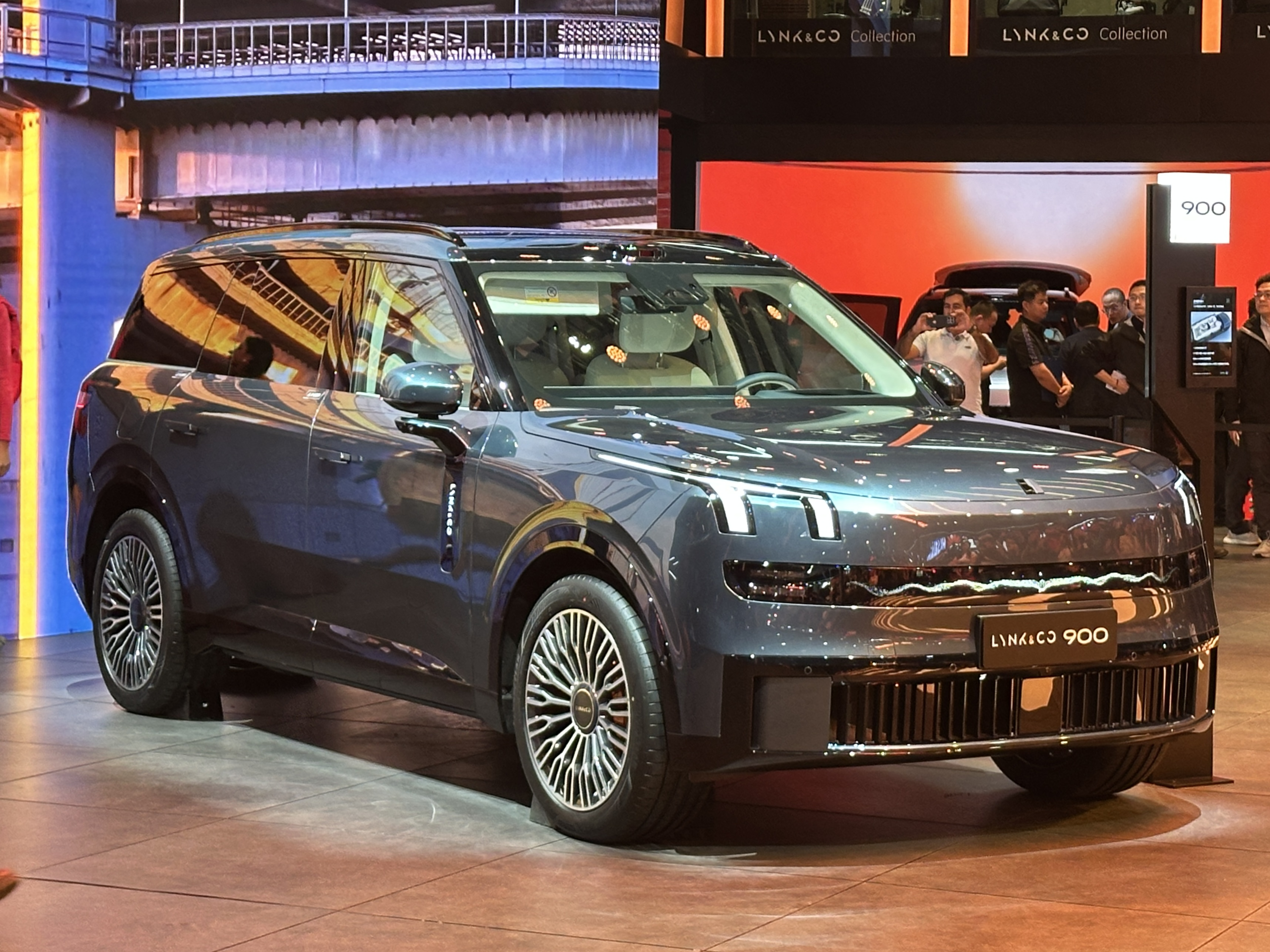
Lynk & Co 900

==== LEVC ====
London Electric Vehicle Company (LEVC) is a brand owned by ZGH that produces and sells electric black cabs and vans. It adopted its current name in 2017 to reflect its new mission of developing and producing electric commercial vehicles. It was formerly named The London Taxi Company, which has roots from Manganese Bronze Holdings, the original manufacturer of black cabs that Geely acquired in 2013.

In January 2025, LEVC was consolidated into Geely Auto. For the Chinese market, the brand was merged into Geely Galaxy dealership network.

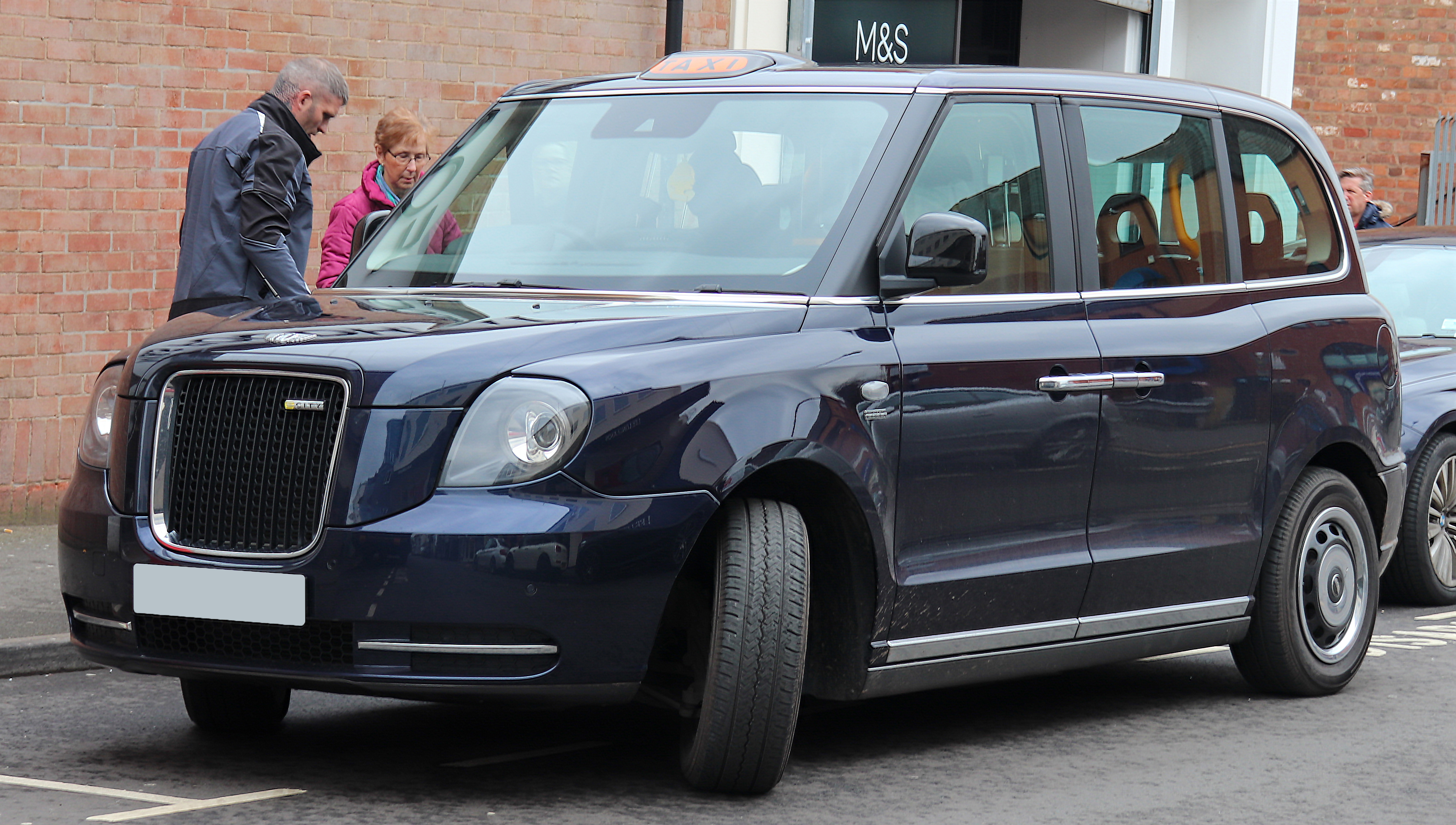
LEVC TX

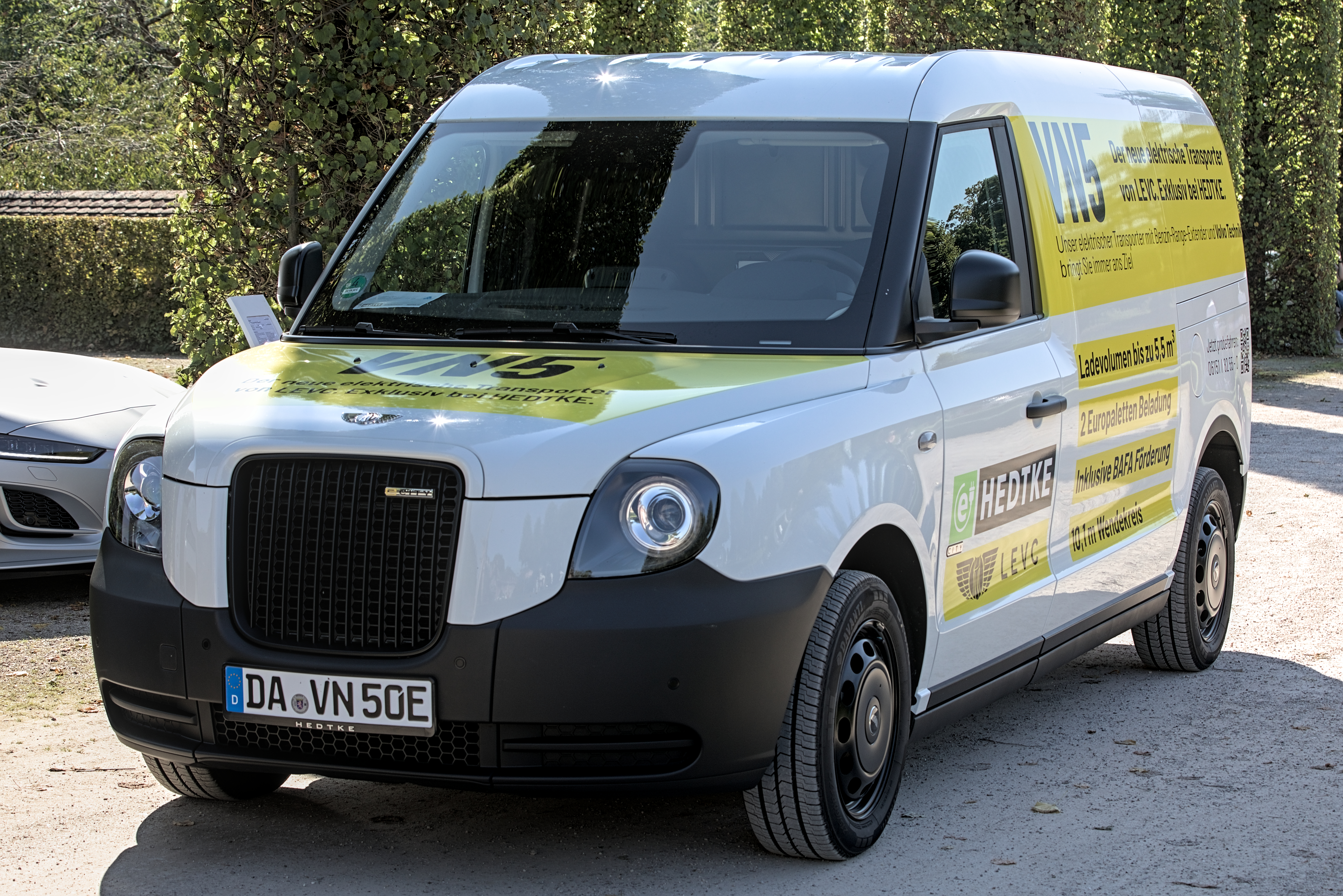
LEVC VN5

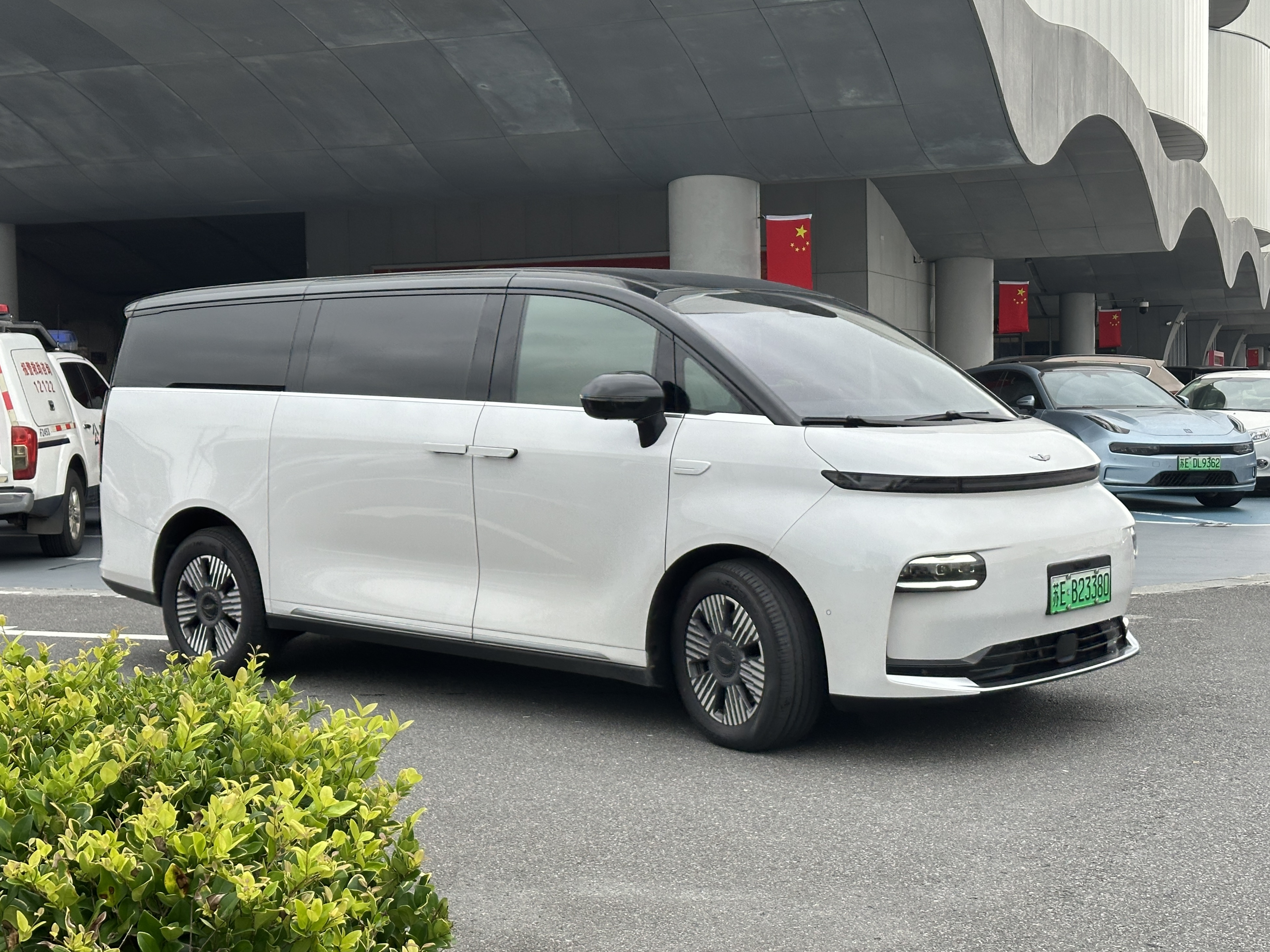
Geely Galaxy LEVC L380

==== Livan/Maple ====
The Maple brand name originated with Shanghai Maple Automobile, a Geely subsidiary established in 1999 and phased out in 2010. The brand was temporarily revived in 2020 by launching its first EV, the Maple 30X. In 2022, Geely launched the joint venture between Lifan and Maple called Livan (Chinese: 睿蓝), and the previous Maple products were reconsolidated into Livan.

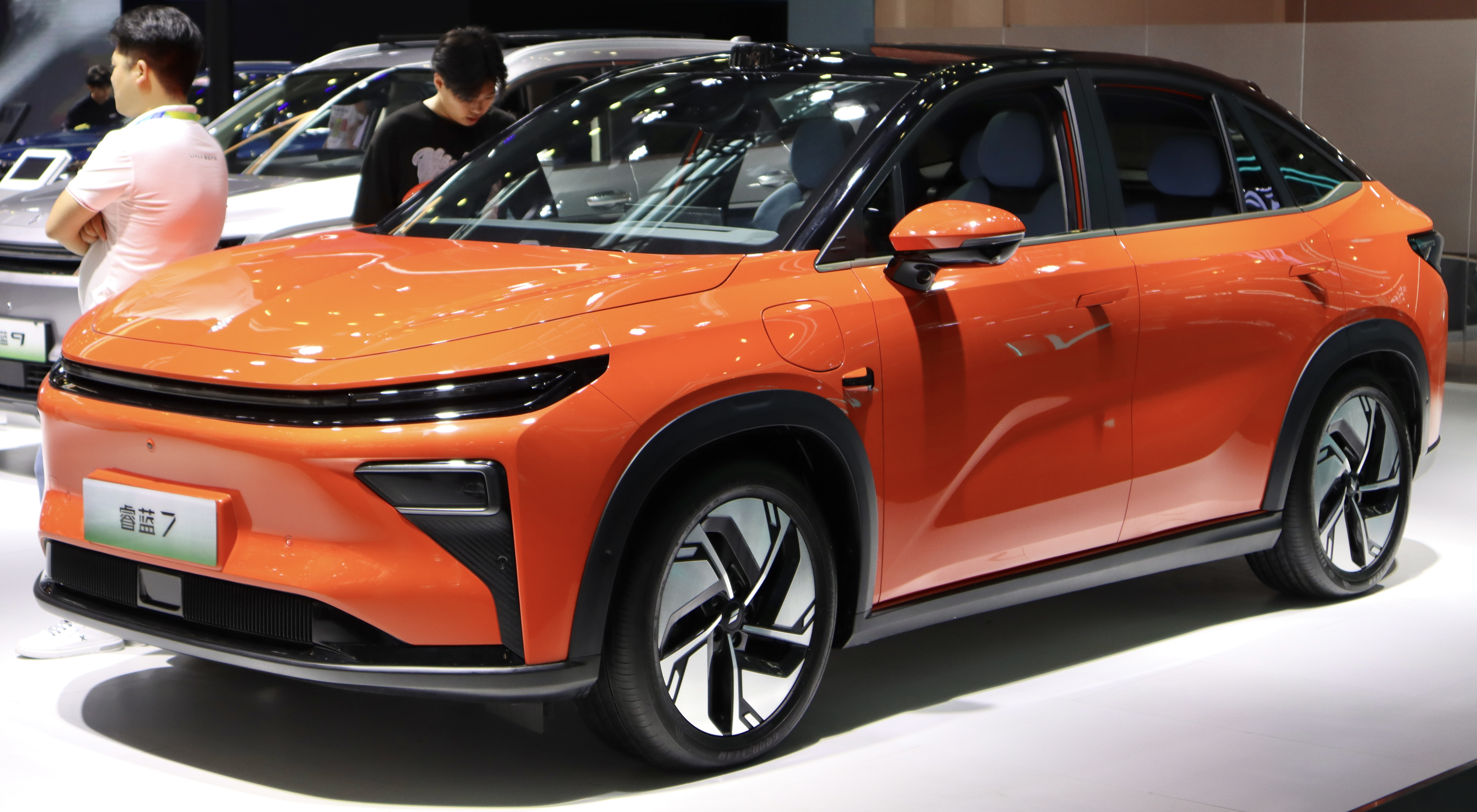
Livan 7

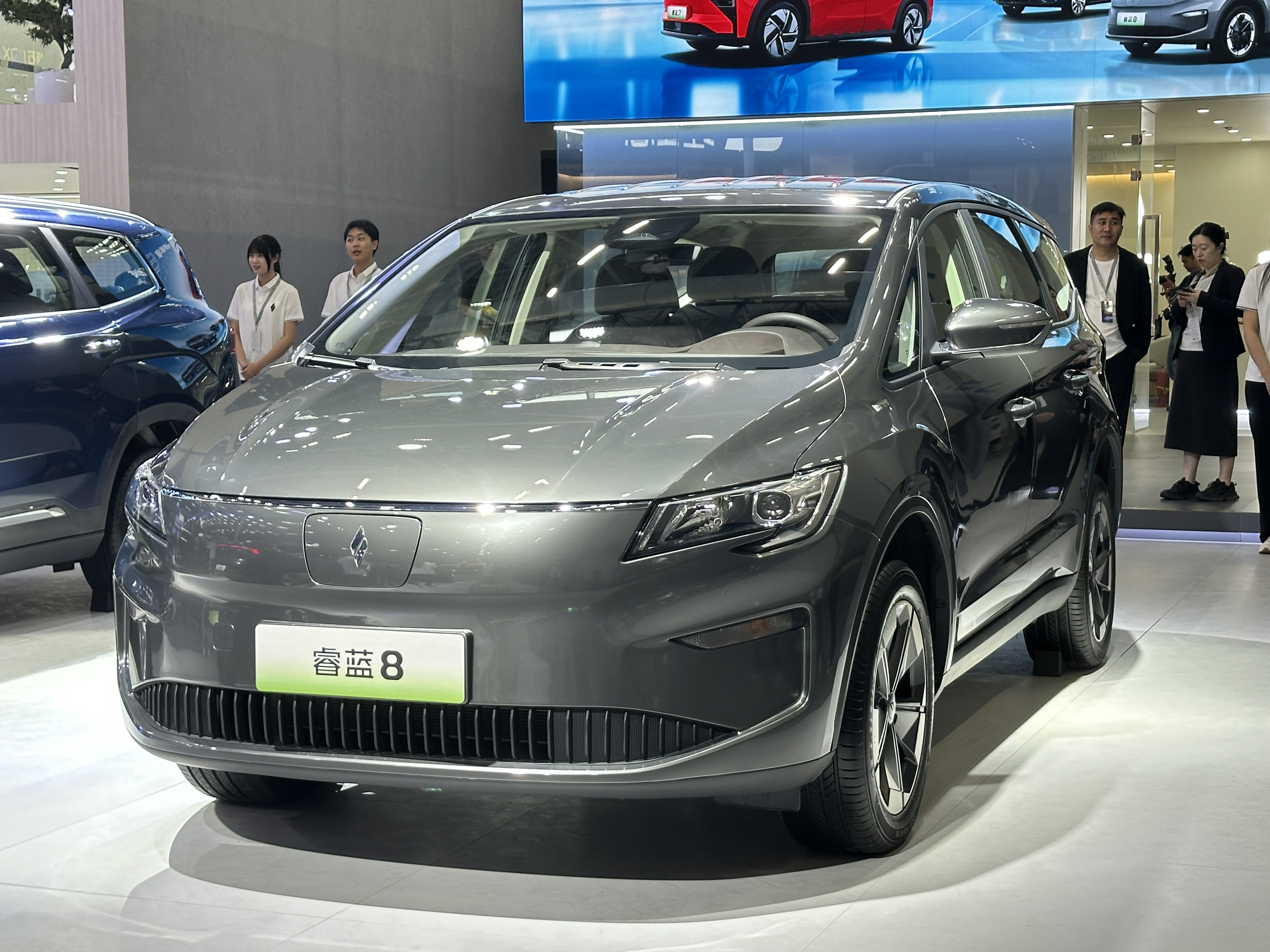
Livan 8

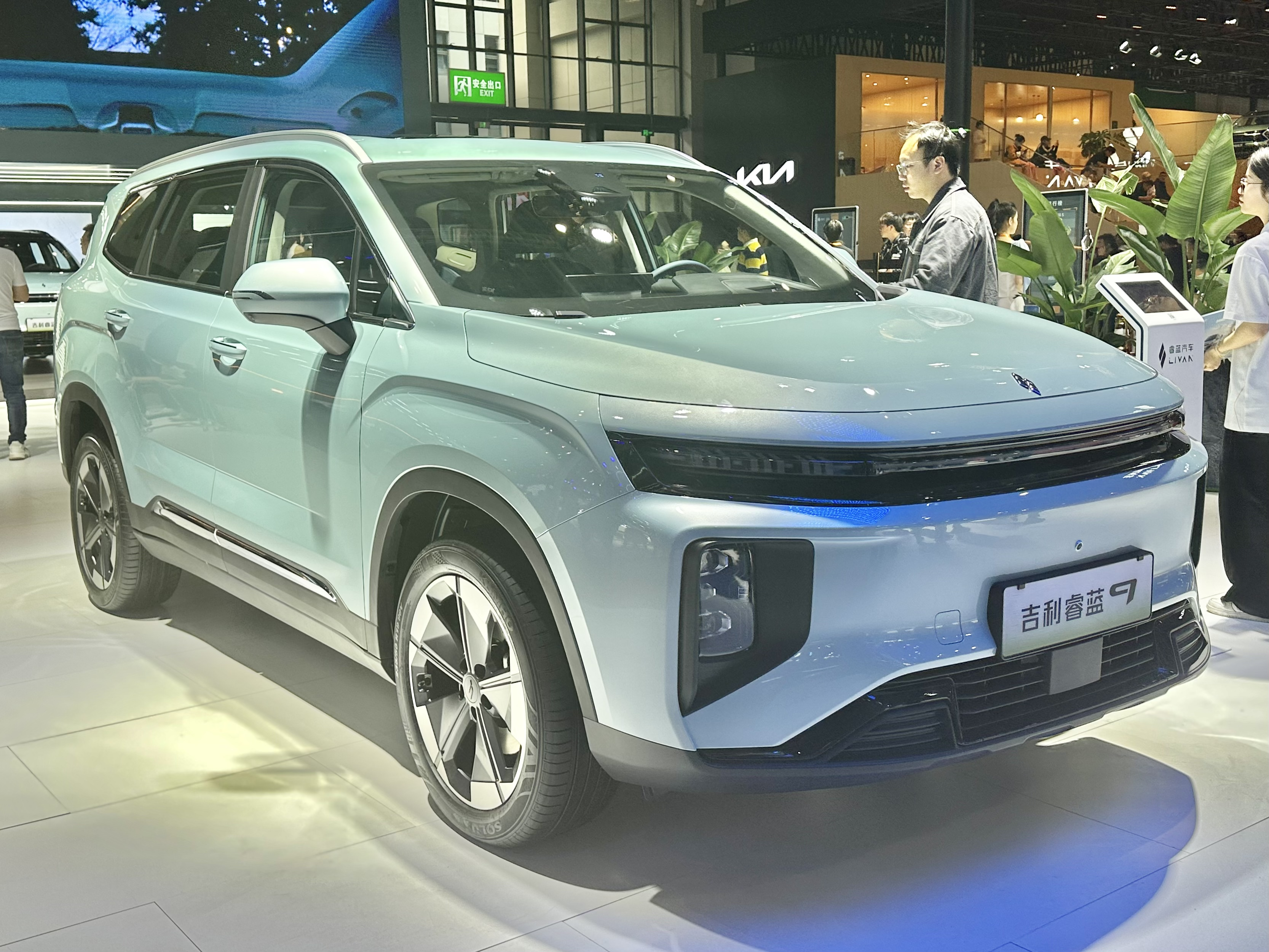
Livan 9

=== Discontinued brands ===
==== Geely Geometry ====
Geely Geometry (Chinese: 吉利几何; pinyin: Jílì Jǐhé) is the battery electric vehicle range of Geely-based cars. Previously independent, the Geometry brand that was established in 2019 was consolidated into Geely Auto as an entry-level battery electric product series in March 2023. In October 2024, the brand was merged into Geely Galaxy, becoming a "smart boutique small car series" within Geely Galaxy.

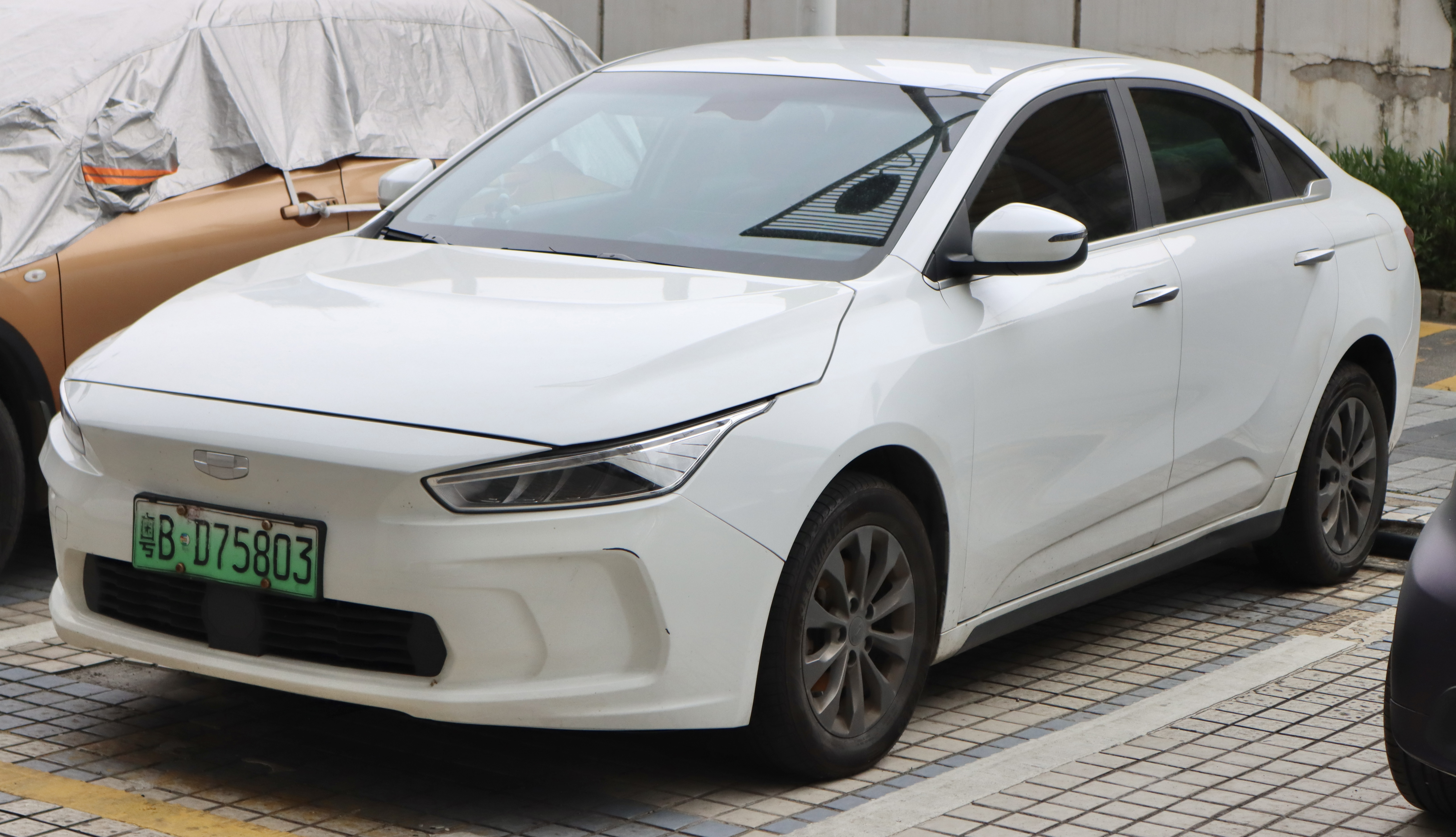
Geometry A

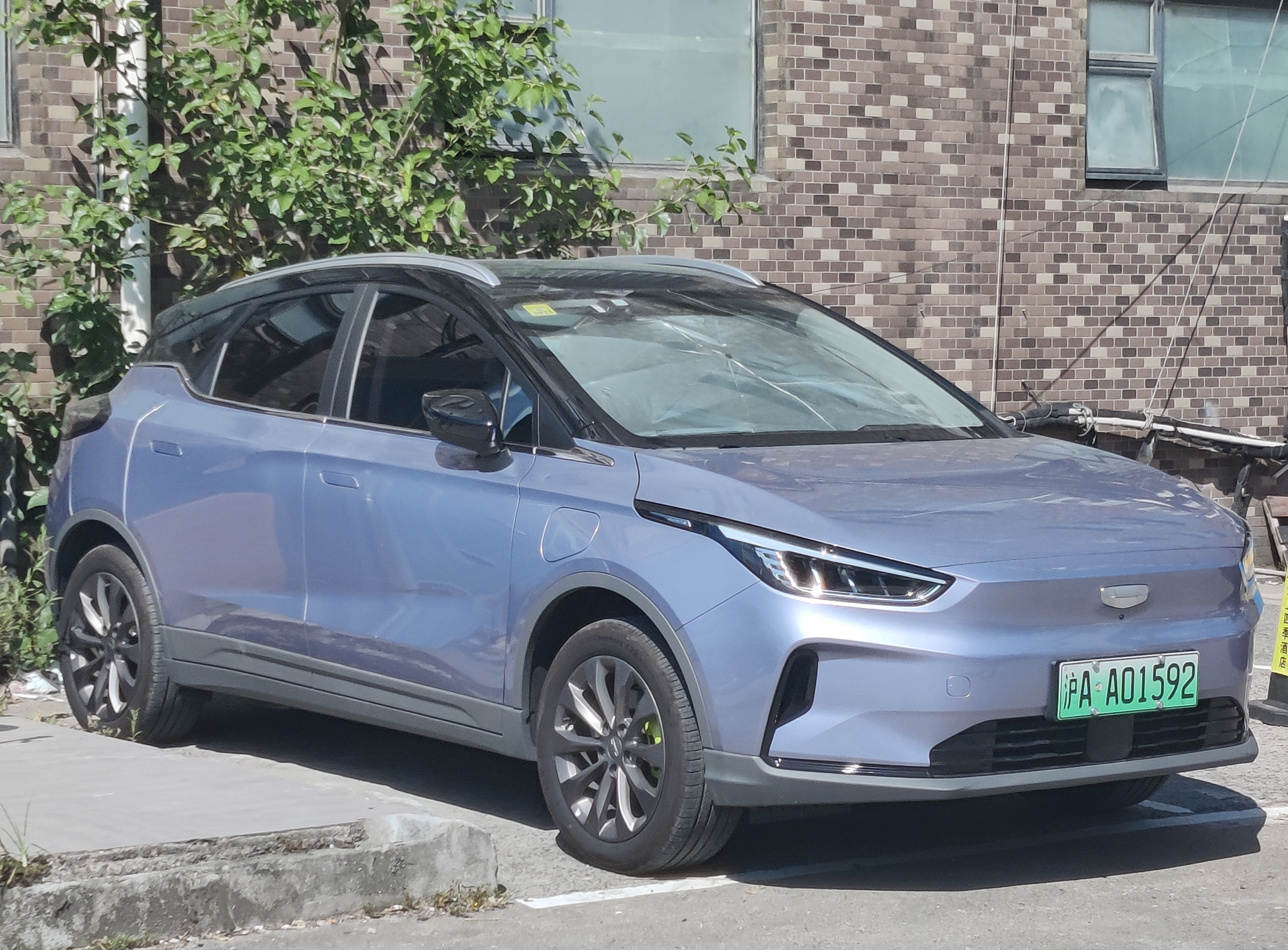
Geometry C

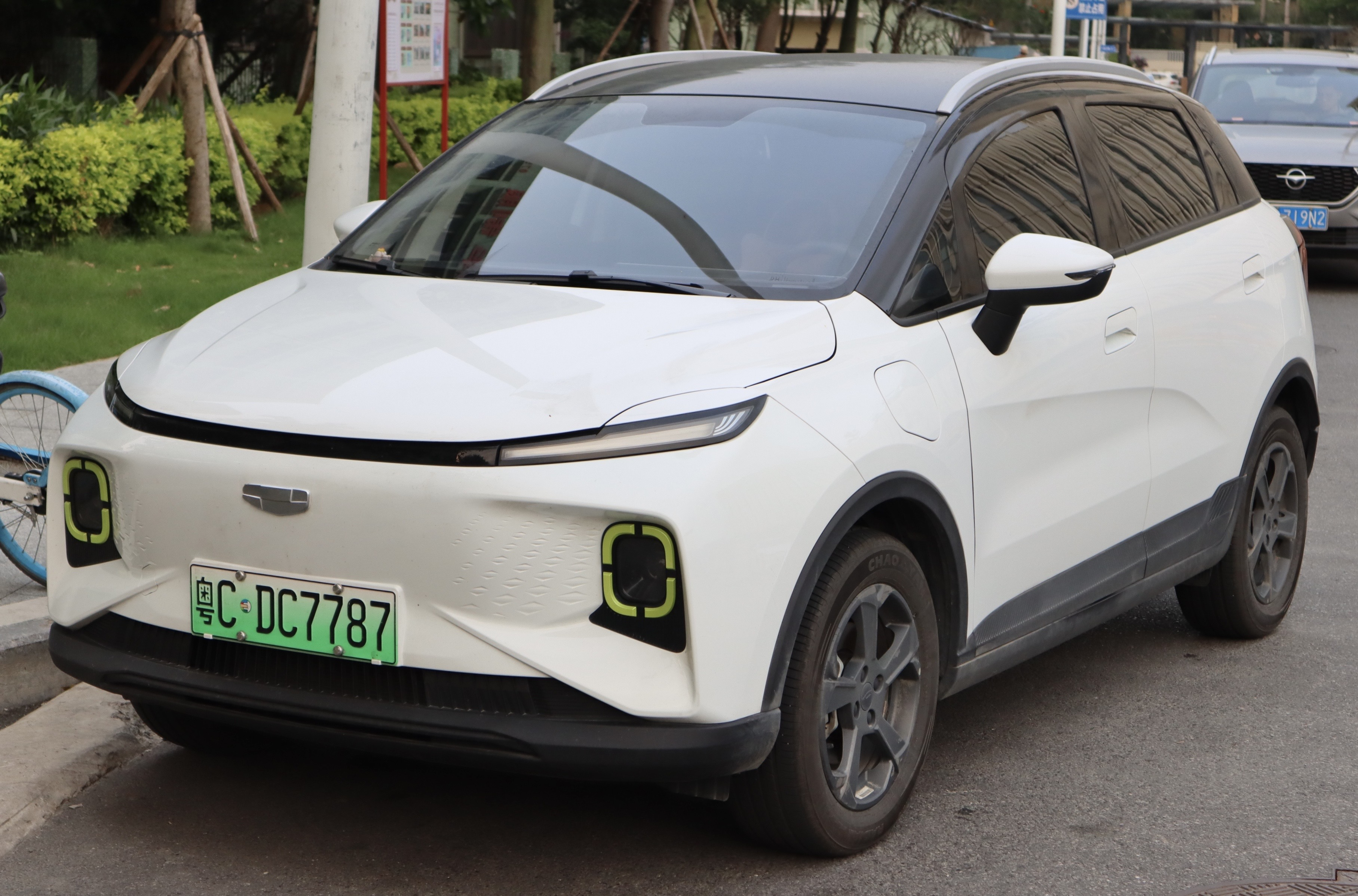
Geometry E

==== Emgrand ====
Emgrand (Chinese: 帝豪; pinyin: Dìháo) was launched in 2009 as a medium- to high-end luxury brand. In 2014, Emgrand ceased to be a standalone brand, and Emgrand became a sub-brand of Geely, which itself adopted an updated version of the Emgrand logo.

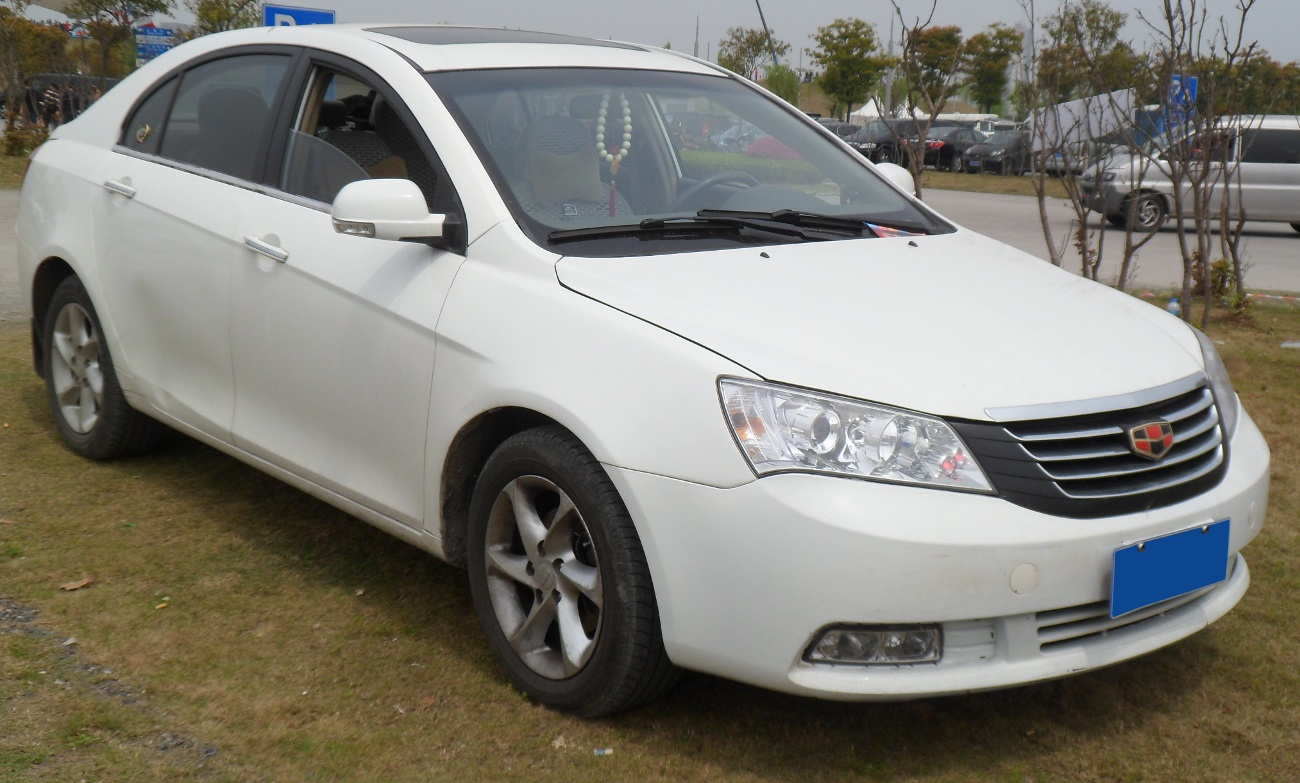
Emgrand EC7

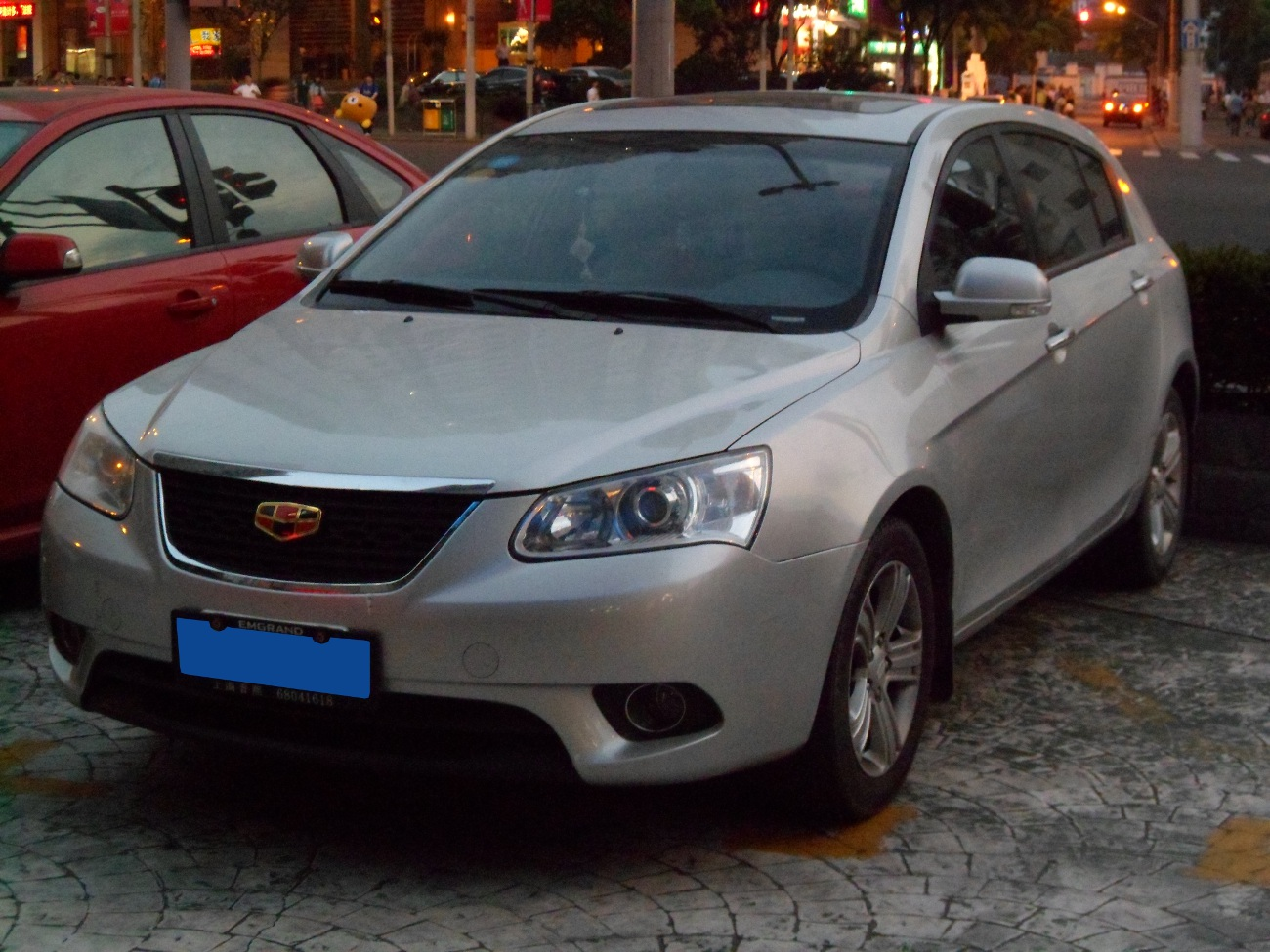
Emgrand EC7-RV

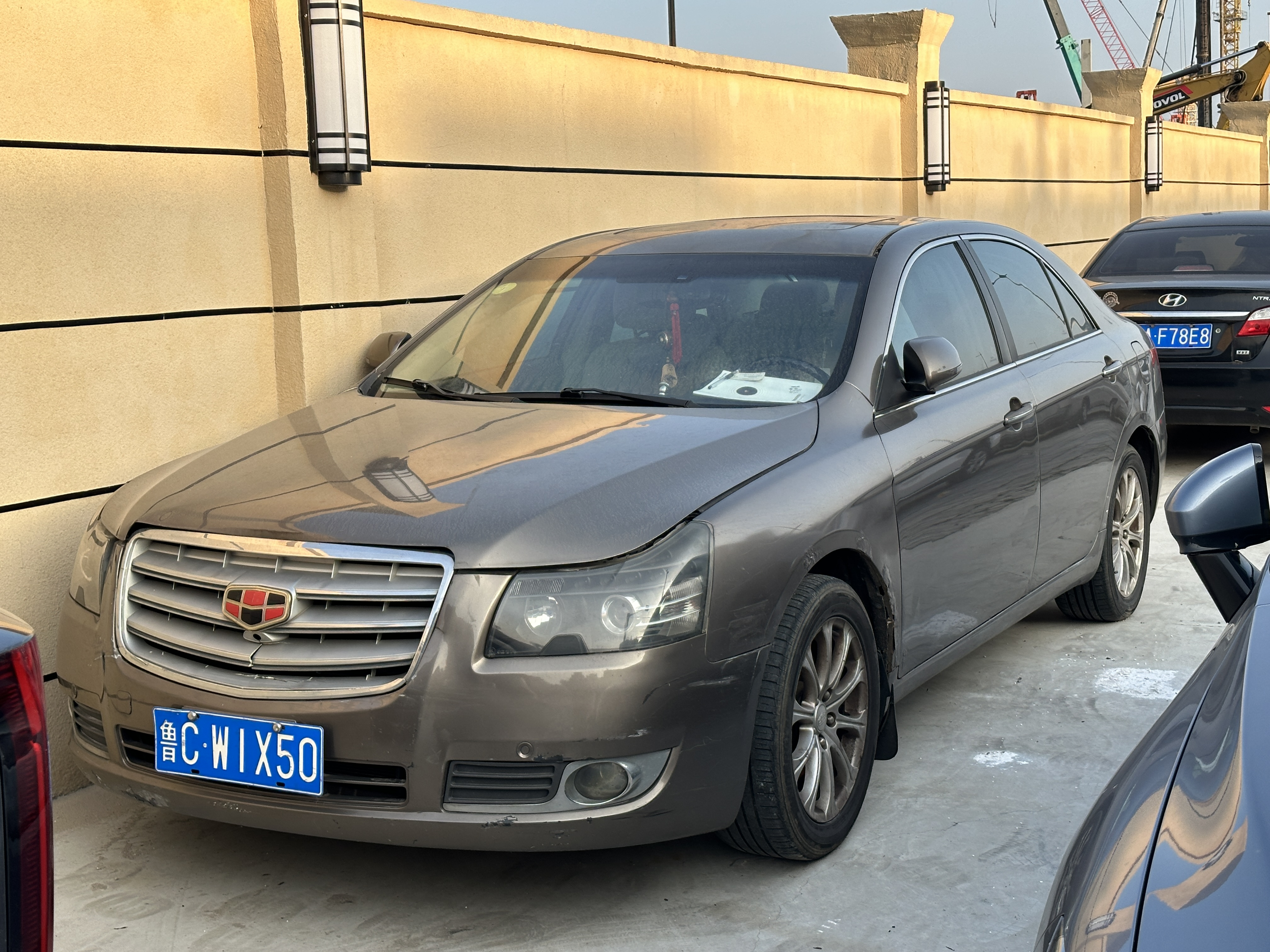
Emgrand EC8

==== Englon ====
Englon (Chinese: 英伦; pinyin: Yīnglún) was launched in 2010 to replace the Shanghai Maple brand. Geely claimed Englon emulated classic, British styled cars. Some of its cars were built by Geely subsidiary Shanghai LTI. As Geely fully acquired The London Taxi Company in 2013, the emblem of Englon also became the new logo of The London Taxi Company.

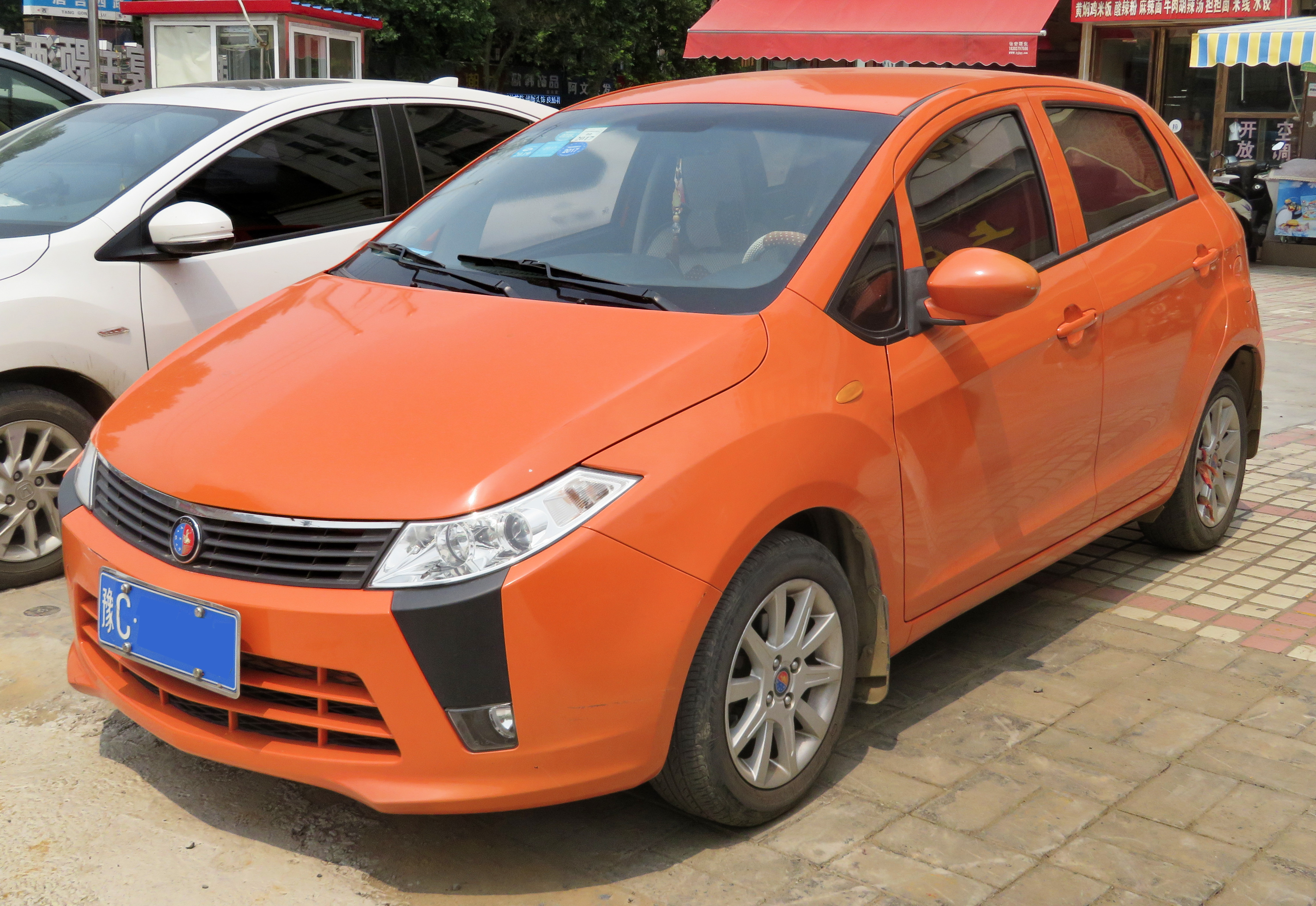
Englon SC5-RV

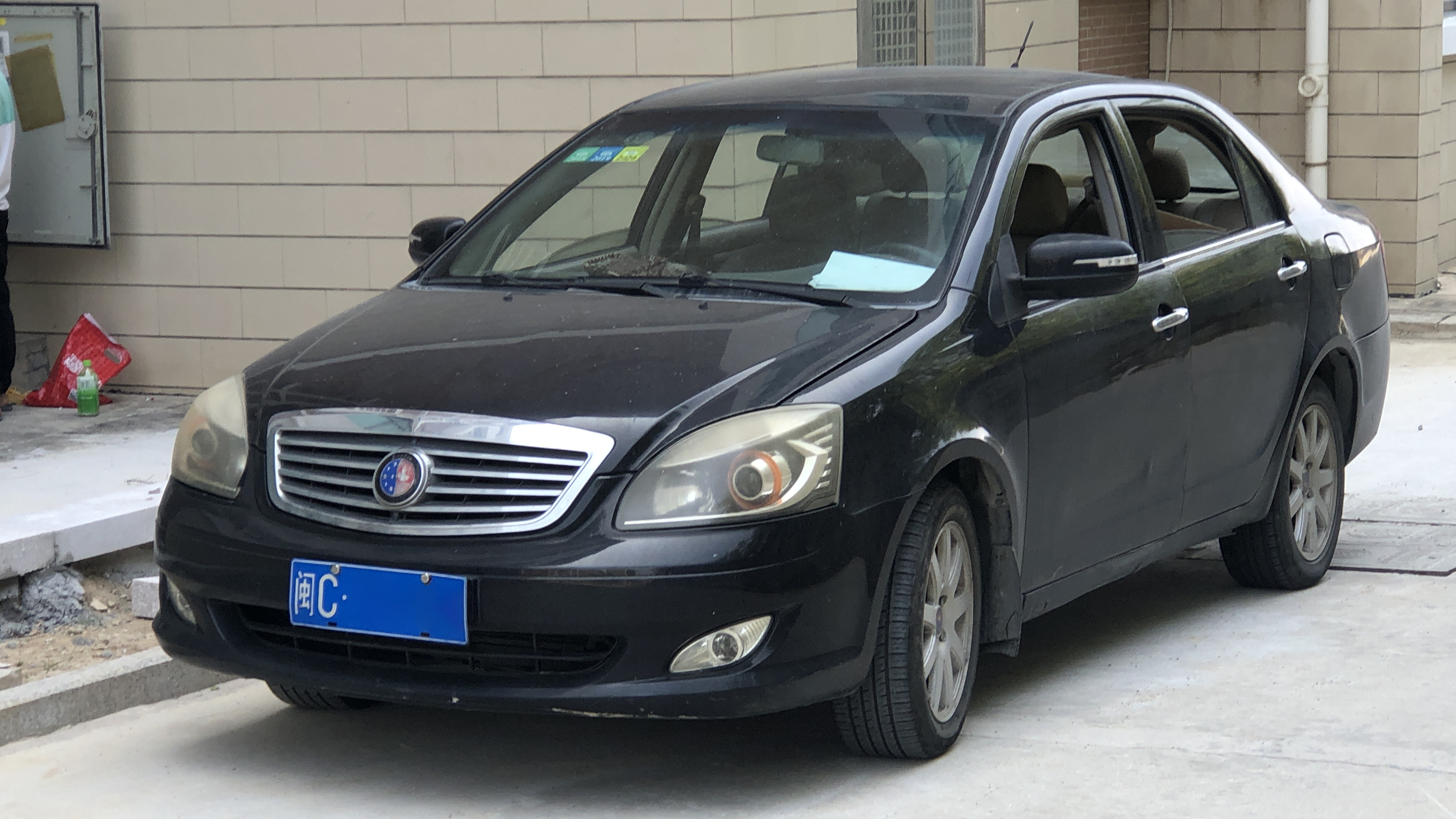
Englon SC7

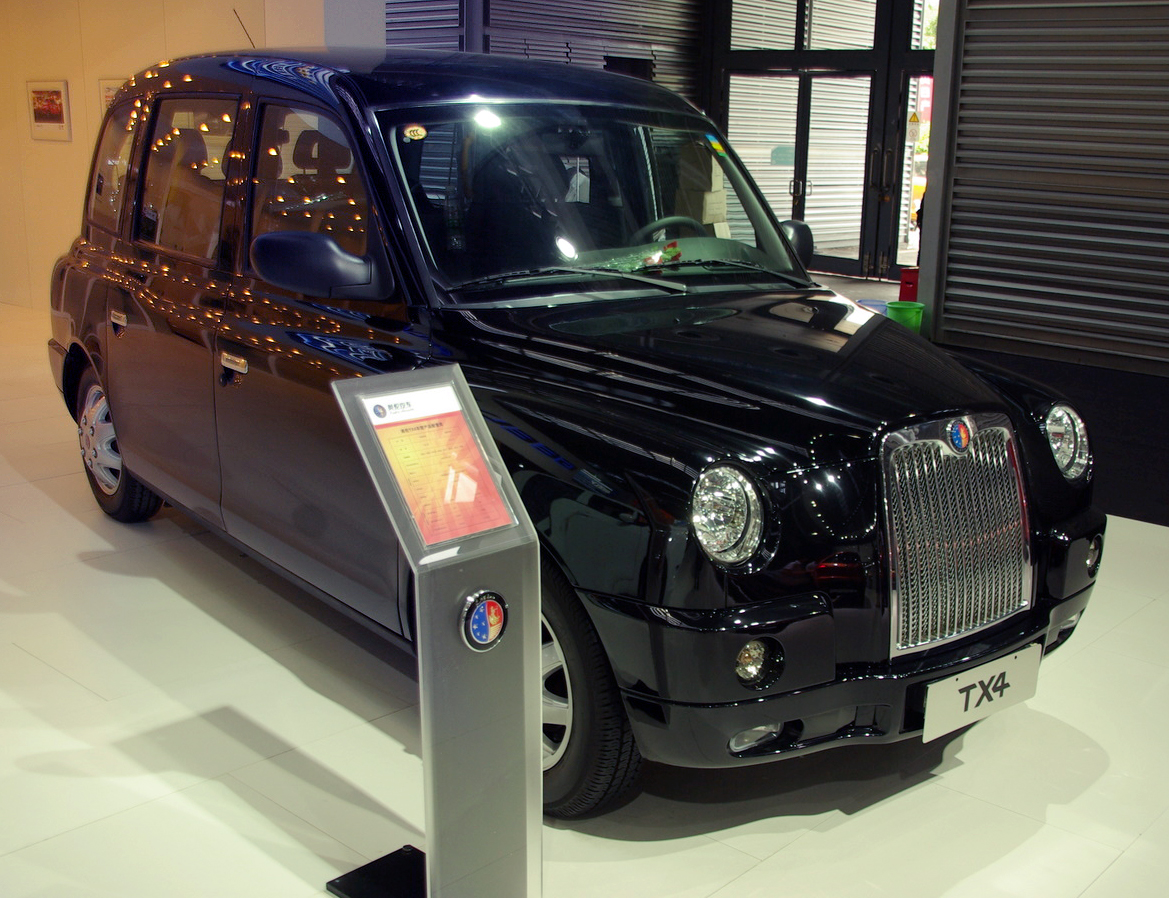
Englon TX4

==== Gleagle ====
Gleagle (Chinese: 全球鹰; pinyin: Quánqiú Yīng) was Geely's entry-level brand sold between 2010 and 2015. Some Gleagle cars, such as the Gleagle Panda, were available for sale on the internet in China via the Taobao Mall, a popular e-commerce site. While Geely would deliver the car to the customer's address, buying one of the Panda models on offer did necessitate a trip to a traditional dealer. This sub-brand was discontinued in 2015. Most Gleagle products continued to be sold directly under the Geely brand.

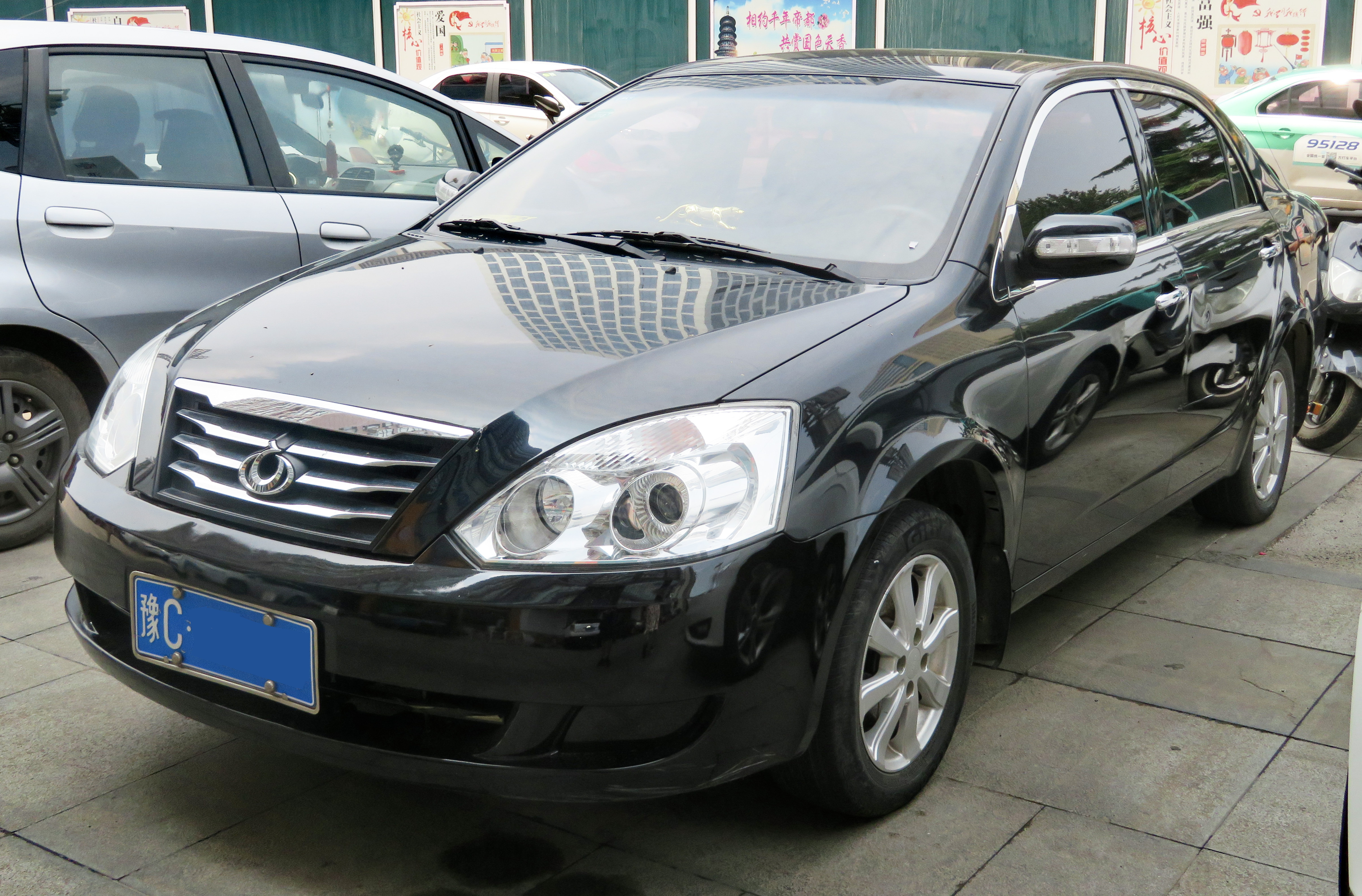
Gleagle GC7

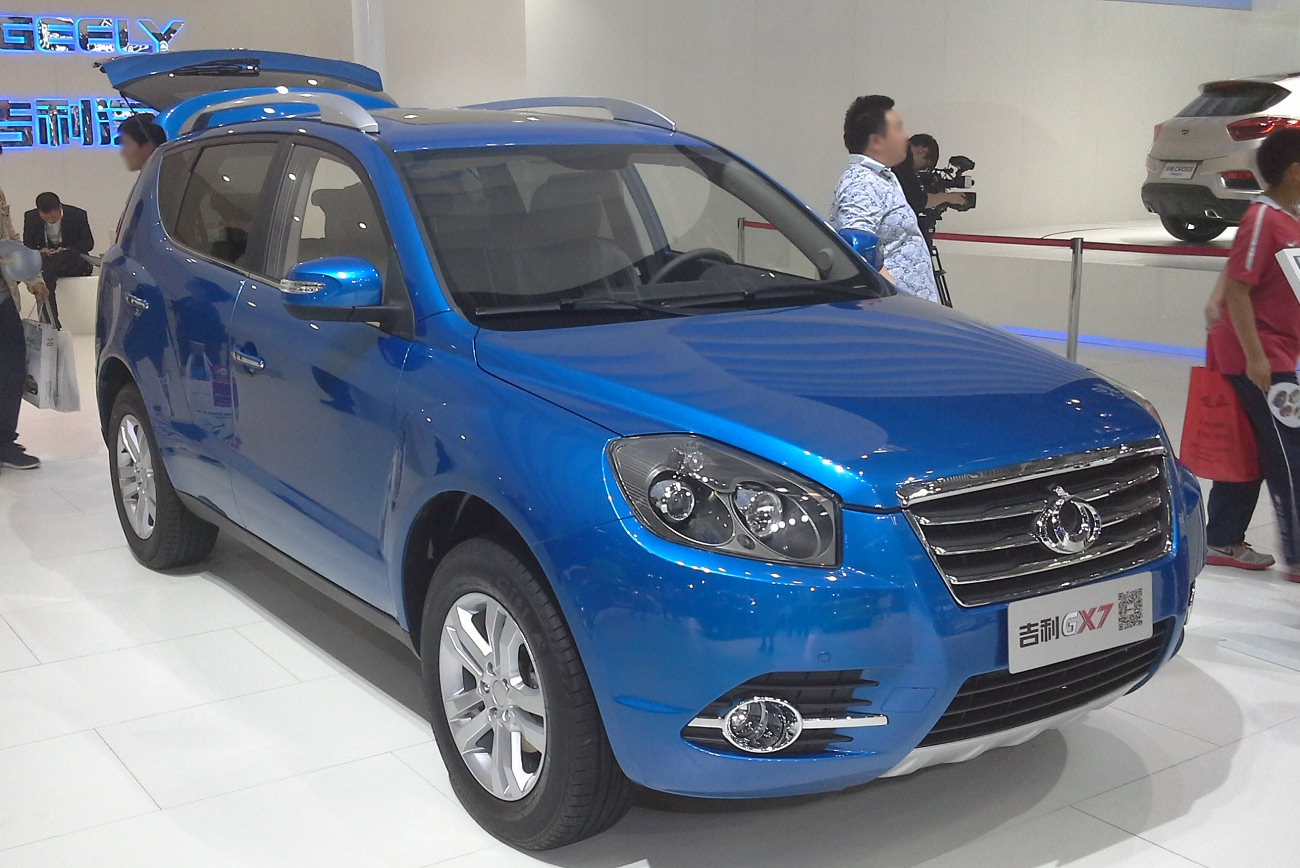
Gleagle GX7

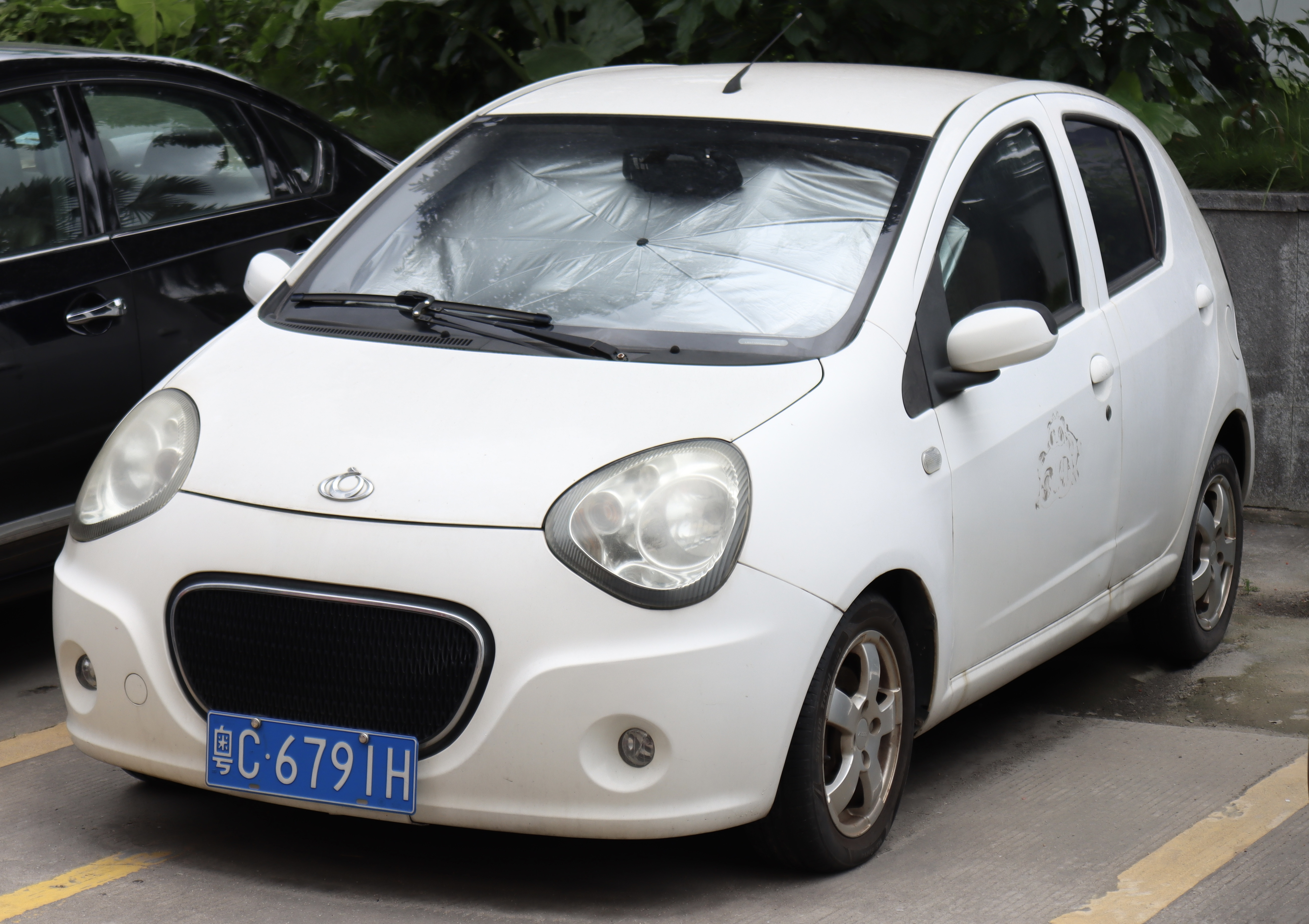
Gleagle Panda

== Motorsport ==
Geely entered the TCR World Tour with Cyan Racing in 2026, using the Preface.

== Controversies ==
The 2009 Geely GE concept received criticism for looking like a Rolls-Royce.

In July 2025, Reuters reported that Zeekr had been involved in a sales inflation practice that raised concerns about transparency and consumer rights.

== Sales ==
| Year | Total | Geely | Geely Geometry | Geely Galaxy | Lynk & Co | Zeekr | Livan/Maple |
|---|---|---|---|---|---|---|---|
| 2009 | 325,413 | undisclosed, unavailable | | | | | not available |
| 2010 | 415,286 | undisclosed, unavailable | | | | | not available |
| 2011 | 421,385 | undisclosed, unavailable | | | | | not available |
| 2012 | 483,483 | undisclosed, unavailable | | | | | not available |
| 2013 | 549,518 | undisclosed, unavailable | | | | | not available |
| 2014 | 417,851 | undisclosed, unavailable | | | | | not available |
| 2015 | 509,863 | undisclosed, unavailable | | | | | not available |
| 2016 | 765,851 | undisclosed, unavailable | | | | | not available |
| 2017 | 1,247,116 | undisclosed, unavailable | | | | | not available |
| 2018 | 1,500,838 | undisclosed, unavailable | | | | | not available |
| 2019 | 1,361,560 | undisclosed, unavailable | | | | | not available |
| 2020 | 1,320,217 | undisclosed, unavailable | | | | | not available |
| 2021 | 1,328,029 | 1,046,186 | 55,320 | - | 220,516 | 6,007 | 4,945 (not included) |
| 2022 | 1,432,988 | 975,391 | 149,389 | - | 180,127 | 71,941 | 56,140 |
| 2023 | 1,686,516 | 1,034,737 | 191,346 | 83,497 | 220,250 | 118,685 | 38,001 |
| 2024 | 2,176,567 | 1,174,563 | merged into Galaxy | 494,440 | 285,441 | 222,123 | 59,094 (not included) |

== See also ==
- Geely, its conglomerate parent company
- List of automobile manufacturers of China
- Automotive industry in China
