= List of Geely vehicles =

Geely Auto is a Chinese car manufacturer owned by Zhejiang Geely Holding. Geely Auto produces a wide range of vehicles from its main brand, Geely and its sub-brand Geely Galaxy. The company also partly owns Lynk & Co, Proton Cars, Geely Radar, London EV Company and Zeekr brands, and a former owner of joint venture brand Livan Automotive. The brands formerly used by the company include Geely Geometry, Emgrand, Englon, and Gleagle.

The following is a list of vehicles under the Geely Auto Group business unit within the holding company Zhejiang Geely Holding. The list does not include vehicles from other brands owned by Zhejiang Geely Holding such as Volvo Cars, Polestar, Smart, Lotus, Livan Automotive and Farizon. This list also does not include Proton, a Geely Auto Group brand which joined the Geely group in 2017 and has since only sold several Geely-based vehicles.

== Current vehicles ==
=== Geely Auto ===
Image	Name(s)	Export name	Chinese name	Introduction (cal. year)	Generation	Code	Vehicle description
Sedans
	Emgrand	Proton S70; BelGee S50	帝豪	2010	5th	SS21	Compact sedan, ICE/HEV variant of Galaxy Starshine 6
	Xingrui Xingrui L Plus	Preface; Galaxy Preface	星瑞 星瑞L Plus	2020 2026	1st 2nd	FS11 FS21	Mid-size sedan, ICE/HEV Mid-size sedan, ICE/HEV variant of Galaxy Starshine 7
SUVs
	Binyue	Coolray; Proton X50; BelGee X50	缤越	2018	1st	SX11	Subcompact SUV, ICE/PHEV
	Icon Cowboy	–	ICON 牛仔	2020	1st	SX12	Subcompact SUV Offroad-inspired variant of Icon
	Boyue	Cityray; Galaxy Cityray	博越	2023	1st	SX21/ G426	Compact SUV, previously the Boyue Cool
	Boyue L	Starray; Atlas	博越L	2016	4th	FX11	Compact SUV
	Boyue REV	Livan 7	博越REV	2026	1st		Compact coupe SUV, EREV variant of Livan 7
	Haoyue L	Okavango	豪越L	2022	1st	VX11	Mid-size SUV, upgraded variant of Haoyue
	Xingyue L Xingyue L Plus	Monjaro –	星越L 星越L Plus	2020 2026	1st 2nd	KX11 KX21	Mid-size SUV, ICE/HEV Second generation

=== Geely Auto (exported or built outside China only) ===
Image	Name(s)	Export name	Chinese name	Introduction (cal. year)	Generation	Code	Vehicle description
Sedans
	Emgrand L	Livan S6 Pro	帝豪L	2016	2nd	FS12	Compact sedan
SUVs
	Boyue	Atlas; Azkarra; Proton X70; BelGee X70	博越	2016	1st	NL-3	Compact SUV, first generation.
	Haoyue	Okavango; Proton X90	豪越	2020	1st	VX11	Mid-size SUV.
	Haoyue Pro	Livan X6 Pro	豪越PRO	2024	3rd	NC31	Compact SUV, successor to the Yuanjing X6
	Xingyue S	Tugella; Knewstar 001	星越S	2019	1st	FY11	Mid-size coupe SUV.
	Yuanjing X3 Pro	GX3 Pro; Livan X3 Pro	远景X3 PRO	2017	2nd		Subcompact SUV, ICE/PHEV, 2nd generation of the Englon SC5-RV.

=== Geely Galaxy, Geely Geometry and LEVC ===
Image	Name	Export name	Chinese name	Introduction (cal. year)	Generation	Code	Vehicle description
Hatchbacks
	Panda Mini EV	–	熊猫Mini EV	2022	1st		City car, BEV
	Xingyuan	EX2; Proton eMas 5; E2	星愿	2024	1st	E22H	Subcompact hatchback, BEV
Sedans
	Geometry A Geometry G6	–	几何A 几何G6	2019 2022	1st	GE11	Compact sedan BEV variant of Geely Emgrand L Upgraded variant of Geometry A
	Galaxy L6	–	银河L6	2023	1st	FS12	Compact sedan, PHEV
	Galaxy Starshine 6	Emgrand EM-i	银河星耀6	2025	1st	P161	Mid-size sedan, PHEV
	Galaxy A7	–	银河A7	2025 2026	1st	P181	Mid-size sedan, BEV/PHEV
	Galaxy Starshine 7	–	银河星耀7	2026	1st	P182	Mid-size sedan, PHEV
	Galaxy E8	–	银河E8	2024	1st	E171	Mid-size sedan, BEV
	Galaxy Starshine 8	–	银河星耀8	2025	1st	P171	Mid-size sedan, BEV/PHEV
	Galaxy TT	–	银河TT	2026	1st	E281	Mid-size sedan, BEV
SUVs
	Geometry E Firefly	–	几何E萤火虫	2022	1st		Subcompact SUV, BEV variant of Geely Vision X3.
	Geometry M6	Geometry C	几何M6	2022	1st	GE13	Compact SUV, BEV variant of Geely Emgrand S
	Galaxy E5	E5; EX5; Galaxy EX5; Proton eMas 7	银河E5	2024	1st	E245	Compact SUV, BEV
	Galaxy M7	–	银河M7	2026	1st	FX12	Compact SUV, PHEV variant of Geely Boyue L
	Galaxy Starship 7	E5 EM-i; EX5 EM-i; EX5 EM-R; Galaxy EX5 EM-i; Starray EM-i; Starray EM-R; BelGee X80 PHEV; Proton eMas 7 PHEV	银河星舰7	2024	1st	P145	Compact SUV, BEV/EREV/PHEV
	Galaxy M9 Galaxy M8	M9	银河M9 银河M8	2025 2026	1st	P117	Full-size SUV, PHEV 5-seater version of Galaxy M9
	Galaxy Cruiser 700	–	银河战舰700	2026	1st	KO11	Mid-size off-road SUV, PHEV
MPV/Van
	LEVC TX	–	–	2017	1st		Mid-size MPV, PHEV
	LEVC VN5	LEVC e-Camper	–	2020	1st		Mid-size van, PHEV
	Galaxy LEVC L380 Galaxy V900	LEVC L380	银河翼真L380 银河V900	2024 2025	1st	XE08	Full-size MPV, BEV EREV variant of LEVC L380

=== Geely Radar ===
Image	Name	Export name	Chinese name	Introduction (cal. year)	Generation	Code	Vehicle description
Pick Up
	Horizon King Kong	Riddara RD6; Riddara Econ	雷达地平线 雷达金刚	2022 2024	1st	KO11	Mid-size Pick-up truck, BEV/PHEV

=== Lynk & Co ===
Image	Name	Export name	Chinese name	Introduction (cal. year)	Generation	Code	Vehicle description
Sedans
	03	–	领克03	2018	1st	CS11	Compact sedan, ICE/PHEV
	07	–	领克07	2024	1st	CS21	Mid-size sedan, PHEV
	10	–	领克10	2025	1st	P372	Full-size sedan, BEV/PHEV
Station wagons
	07 GT	–	领克07 GT	2026	1st		Mid-size wagon, PHEV
SUV
	01	–	领克01	2017	1st	CX11	Compact SUV, ICE/PHEV
	05	–	领克05	2019	1st	DCY11	Compact coupe SUV, ICE/PHEV
	20	02	领克20	2024	1st	E335	Compact SUV, BEV, previously Z20
	06	–	领克06	2020	1st	BX11	Subcompact SUV, ICE/PHEV
	08	–	领克08	2023	1st	DX11	Mid-size SUV, PHEV
	09	–	领克09	2021	1st	EX11	Mid-size SUV, ICE/HEV/PHEV
	900 900L	–	领克900 领克900L	2025 2026	1st	L946	Full-size SUV, PHEV

=== Zeekr ===
Image	Name	Export name	Chinese name	Introduction (cal. year)	Generation	Code	Vehicle description
Sedans
	007	–	极氪007	2023	1st	CS1E	Mid-size sedan, BEV
Station wagons
	001	–	极氪001	2021	1st	DC1E	Full-size shooting brake, BEV
	007 GT	7 GT	极氪007 GT	2025	1st	CC1E	Mid-size shooting brake, BEV
SUVs
	X	–	极氪X	2023	1st	BX1E	Subcompact SUV, BEV
	7X	–	极氪7X	2024	1st	CX1E	Mid-size SUV, BEV
	8X	–	极氪8X	2026	1st	DX1H	Full-size luxury SUV, PHEV
	9X	–	极氪9X	2025	1st	EX1H	Full-size luxury SUV, PHEV
MPVs
	009	–	极氪009	2023	1st	EF1E	Full-size MPV, BEV
	Mix	–	极氪MIX	2024	1st	CM2E	Compact MPV, BEV
	Ojai	Waymo Ojai	–	2026	1st	CM1E	Compact MPV vehicle for Waymo, BEV

== Discontinued vehicles ==
=== Geely Auto ===
Image	Name	Chinese name	Also called	Introduction (cal. year)	Discontinued	Generation	Vehicle description
Hatchbacks
	Emgrand EC7-RV	帝豪EC7-RV	Geely Emgrand EC7; Geely Emgrand 7	2009	2017	2nd gen	Compact hatchback
	Englon TX4	英伦TX4	TX4	2009	2019	1st	Compact taxi car
	Englon SC5-RV Englon SX5	英伦SC5-RV 英伦SX5	Geely GC5	2011	2015	1st, succeeded by Yuanjing X3 as 2nd generation	Subcompact hatchback SUV variant of Englon SC5-RV
	MK	金鹰	Geely Jinying Cross; Englon SC6-RV; Geely MK2	2006	2017	1st	Subcompact hatchback
	HQ	豪情	–	1998	2006	1st	Subcompact hatchback
	MR	美日	–	2003	2006	1st	Subcompact hatchback
	LC	熊猫	Geely Panda; Gleagle Panda; Gleagle GX2; Geely GC2	2008	2016	1st	City car
Sedans
	Binrui	缤瑞	Geely Binray	2018	2026	1st	Compact sedan
	Borui Borui GE	博瑞 博瑞GE	Geely Borui GT; Geely Emgrand GT	2015	2022	1st	Mid-size sedan PHEV variant of Borui
	Emgrand EC8	帝豪EC8	–	2010	2014	1st	Mid-size sedan
	Emgrand GL Emgrand EV Pro	帝豪GL 帝豪EV Pro	–	2016 2020	2020 2025	1st, succeeded by Geely Emgrand L as 2nd generation	Compact sedan BEV variant of Emgrand GL
	Emgrand L Hi·X/ Hi·P	帝豪L雷神Hi·X/Hi·P	–	2022	2025	2nd	Compact sedan, PHEV variant of Emgrand L
	Yuanjing	远景	Geely Haijing; Geely FC; Geely SC7; Englon SC7; Gleagle GC7	2006	2021	3rd	Compact sedan
	Emgrand EC7	帝豪EC7	Geely Emgrand; Geely Emgrand EC7; Geely Emgrand 7	2009	2021	1st-3rd gen, succeeded by Geely Emgrand as 4th generation	Compact sedan
	Gleagle GC5	全球鹰GC5	Geely GC5	2011	2015	1st	Subcompact sedan
	MK	金刚	Englon SC6	2006	2020	1st	Subcompact sedan
	CK	自由舰	Geely Otaka; Geely Echo; Gleagle CK; Englon SC3	2005	2016	1st	Subcompact sedan
	MR	优利欧	–	2003	2006	1st	Subcompact sedan
SUV
	GX9	豪情SUV	Emgrand EX8	2014	2017	1st	Mid-size SUV
	Emgrand GS Emgrand S	帝豪GS 帝豪S	–	2016 2021	2021 2024	2nd	Compact SUV
	Yuanjing S1	远景S1	–	2017	2019	1st	Compact SUV
	GX7 Yuanjing X6	GX7 远景X6	Geely Emgrand EX7; Gleagle GX7; Englon SX7; –	2012 2016	2016 2024	1st, succeeded by Haoyue Pro as 2nd generation	Compact SUV
	Yuanjing X1	远景X1	–	2017	2021	1st	Subcompact SUV
MPV
	Jiaji	嘉际	–	2019	2025	1st	Compact MPV
Pick Up
	PU		Geely JL1010N; Geely JL5010X; Geely JL1010E1	2001	2007	1st	Subcompact coupé utility
Sport car
	CD	中国龙	–	2009	2011	1st	Coupe
	BL	美人豹	–	2003	2006	1st	Coupe

=== Geely Galaxy and Geely Geometry ===
Image	Name	Chinese name	Introduction (cal. year)	Discontinued	Generation	Code	Vehicle description
SUV
	Geometry C	几何C	2020	2024	1st	GE13	Compact hatchback, BEV variant of Geely Emgrand S
	Geometry EX3	几何EX3	2021	2022	1st		Subcompact SUV, BEV variant of Geely Yuanjing X3 Pro
	Galaxy L7	银河L7	2023	2026	1st	FX12	Compact SUV, PHEV variant of Geely Boyue L

=== Lynk & Co ===
Image	Name	Chinese name	Introduction (cal. year)	Discontinued	Generation	Code	Vehicle description
Hatchbacks
	02	领克02	2018 2021	2023	1st	CC11	Compact SUV Compact hatchback
Sedans
	Z10	领克Z10	2024	2026	1st	E371	Full-size sedan, BEV

== Concept vehicles ==
Image	Name	Introduction (cal. year)
	Geely Galaxy Cruiser	2025
	Geely Galaxy Starship	2024
	Geely Galaxy Light	2023
	Geely Vision Starburst Concept	2021
	Geely Preface Concept	2019
	Geely Concept Icon	2018
	Geely MPV Concept	2017
	Geely Emgrand Concept	2015
	Geely KC Concept	2014
	Englon SC7-RV	2011
	Gleagle GX6	2011
	Gleagle GS-CC	2011
	Geely IG	2011
	Geely GT	2011
	Gleagle GX5	2011
	Englon EC6-RV	2011
	Gleagle GC6	2011, 2012
	Emgrand EX9	2010
	Emgrand EV7	2010
	Englon SV5	2010
	Englon TXN	2010
	Englon SC6-RV	2010
	Englon SX6	2010, 2011
	Gleagle GC3	2010
	Geely/Emgrand GE	2009, 2012
	Gleagle GV5	2009
	Emgrand EV8	2009

== See also ==
- List of Proton vehicles
- List of Volvo vehicles
- List of Lotus vehicles
- B-segment Modular Architecture
- Compact Modular Architecture
- Sustainable Experience Architecture
