= Geely Binrui =

Compact sedan

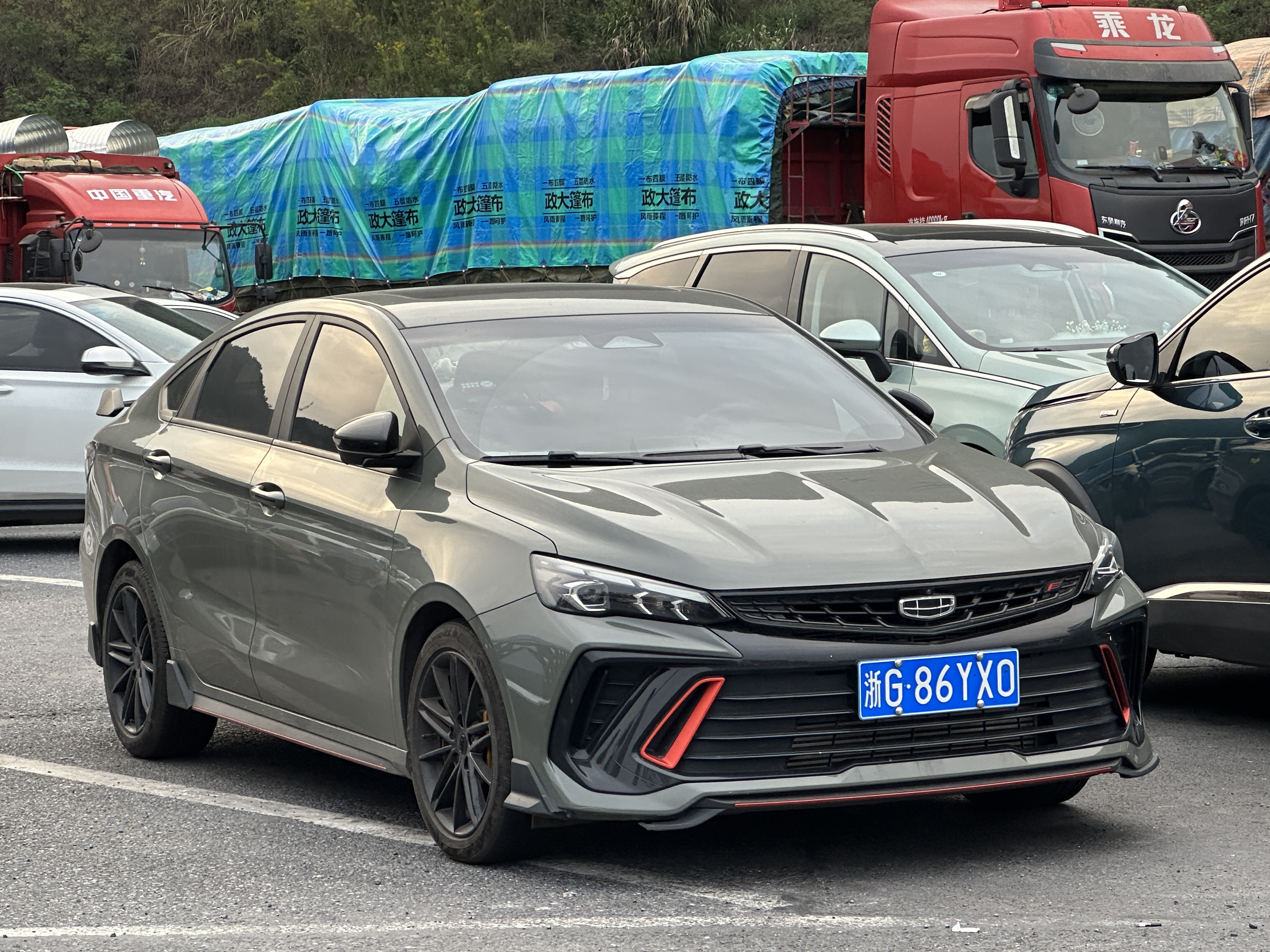
- 2022 Geely Binrui Cool

Overview
- Manufacturer: Geely Auto
- Model code: FE-6
- Also called: Geely Binray
- Production: 2018–2026
- Assembly: China

Body and chassis
- Class: Compact car (C)
- Body style: 4-door sedan
- Layout: Front-engine, front-wheel-drive
- Platform: Geely BMA platform
- Related: Geely Binyue; Geely Icon; Lynk & Co 06

Powertrain
- Engine: 1.0 L JLF-3G10TD G-Power 200T (1.0TD) Turbo direct injection I3; 1.4 L JLB-4G14T G-Power 14T Turbo I4
- Transmission: 6-speed manual; 6-speed dual-clutch; CVT (8-Speed simulated)

Dimensions
- Wheelbase: 2,670 mm (105.1 in)
- Length: 4,680 mm (184.3 in); 4,710 mm (185.4 in) (Binrui Cool)
- Width: 1,785 mm (70.3 in); 1,795 mm (70.7 in) (Binrui Cool)
- Height: 1,460 mm (57.5 in); 1,455 mm (57.3 in) (Binrui Cool)
- Curb weight: 1,235–1,260 kg (2,723–2,778 lb)

The Geely Binrui (Chinese: 吉利缤瑞; pinyin: Jílì bīn ruì) is a compact sedan produced by Chinese car manufacturer Geely. The vehicle went on sale on 30 August 2018. The vehicle is based on the Geely BMA platform, as the first vehicle based on the platform.

== Overview ==
In May 2018, Geely released a "A06" model and named it Geely SL. It sets its position as a sport sedan based on Geely Emgrand GL. The new car should be able to face the need of young people. The exterior appearance of fastback body style and the headlight takes ideas from Geely Borui GE.

The new car carries the Geely's G-Power 1.4-litre turbocharged engine mated to 6-speed manual or CVT transmission and 1.0-litre turbocharged engine mated to 6-speed dual-clutch transmission. Binrui provides self-driving on level 2, which equipped autonomous cruise control. It's also possible to free hands from the steering wheel with the lane support system. Since this is only a assisted system, the system would warn the driver after a few minutes or the lane support system could not find the lane markings. The self-driving system is not able to overtake and switch lane.

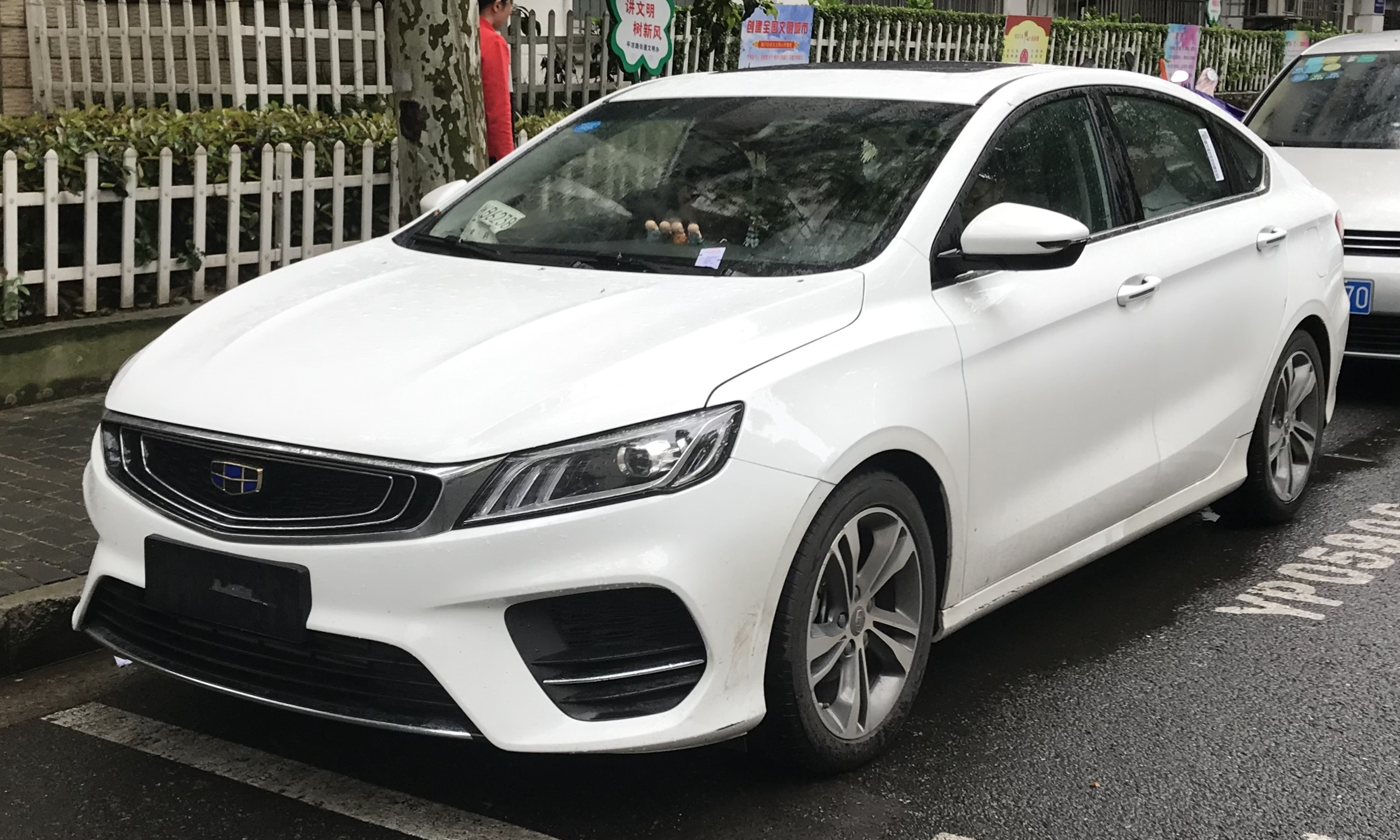
2018 Geely Binrui

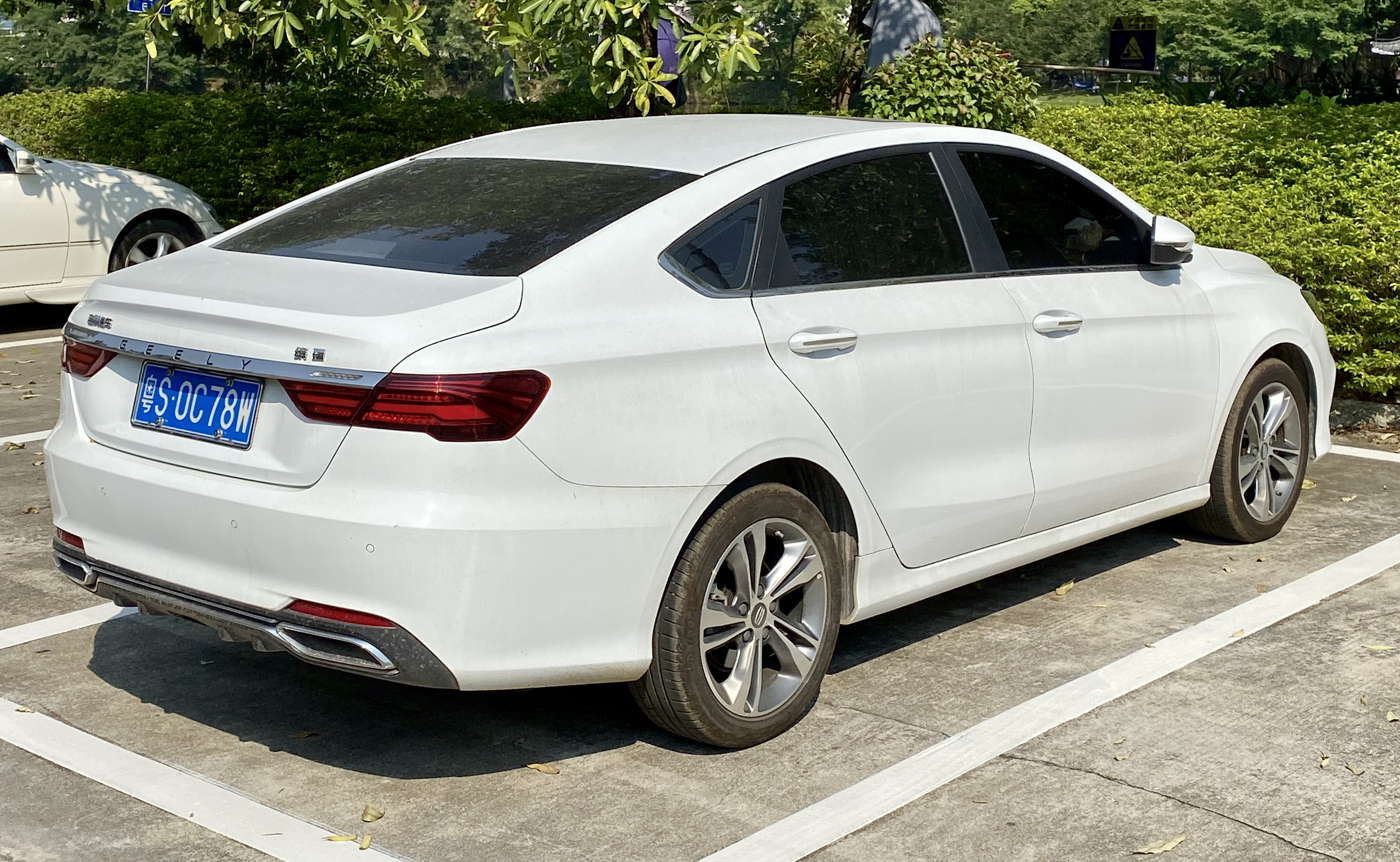
Rear view

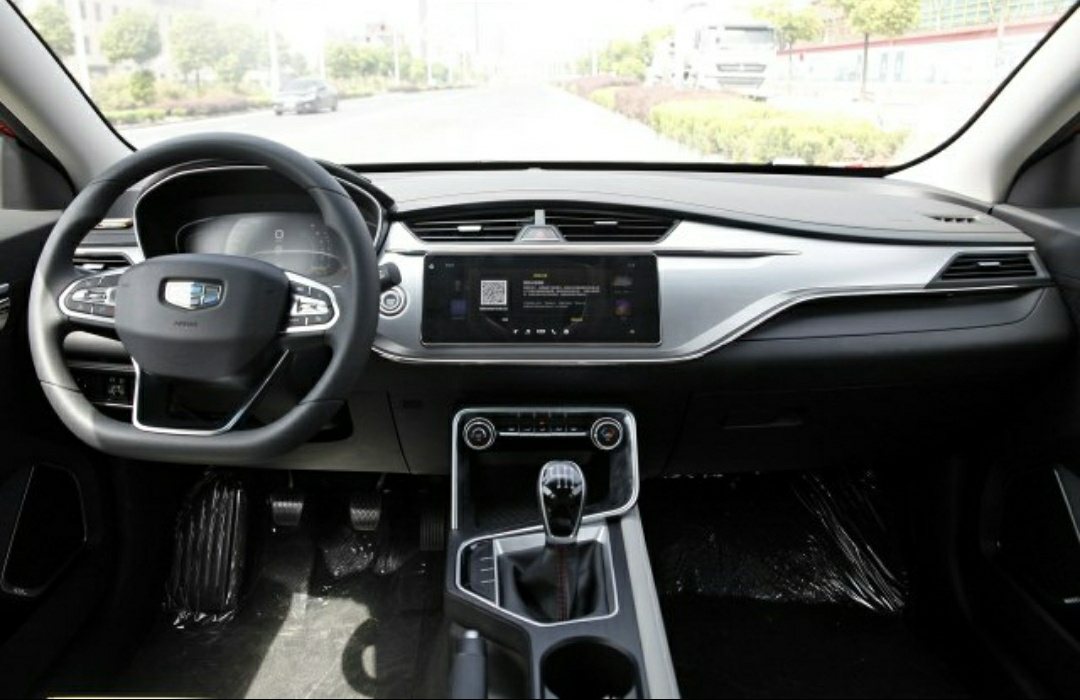
Interior

=== Engines ===
There are two engine options available for the Geely Binrui, which include a 1.0-litre three-cylinder turbo engine producing 136 hp (101 kW; 138 PS) and a 1.4-litre turbo four-cylinder engine producing power of 133 hp (99 kW; 135 PS). Binrui CVT is sourced from Punch Transmission VT5 capable of up to 280 N⋅m (210 lb⋅ft) of torque.

The Binrui F-Type Sport variant launched in December 2020 features a revised version of the 1.4 litre turbo petrol inline-four engine that produces 141 PS (104 kW; 139 hp) and 235 N⋅m (173 lb⋅ft) of torque.

=== Geely Binrui F-Type Sport ===
A sportier variant of the Binrui dubbed the Binrui F-Type Sport was unveiled in December 2020. The F-Type Sport variant features a black finish honeycomb grille, lower front bumper intake and trim, rear spoiler and diffuser trim, window trim and side mirror covers, along with a set of smoked, double-five-spoke alloys. In terms of power, the F-Type Sport variant is powered by a revised version of the 1.4-litre turbo petrol engine.

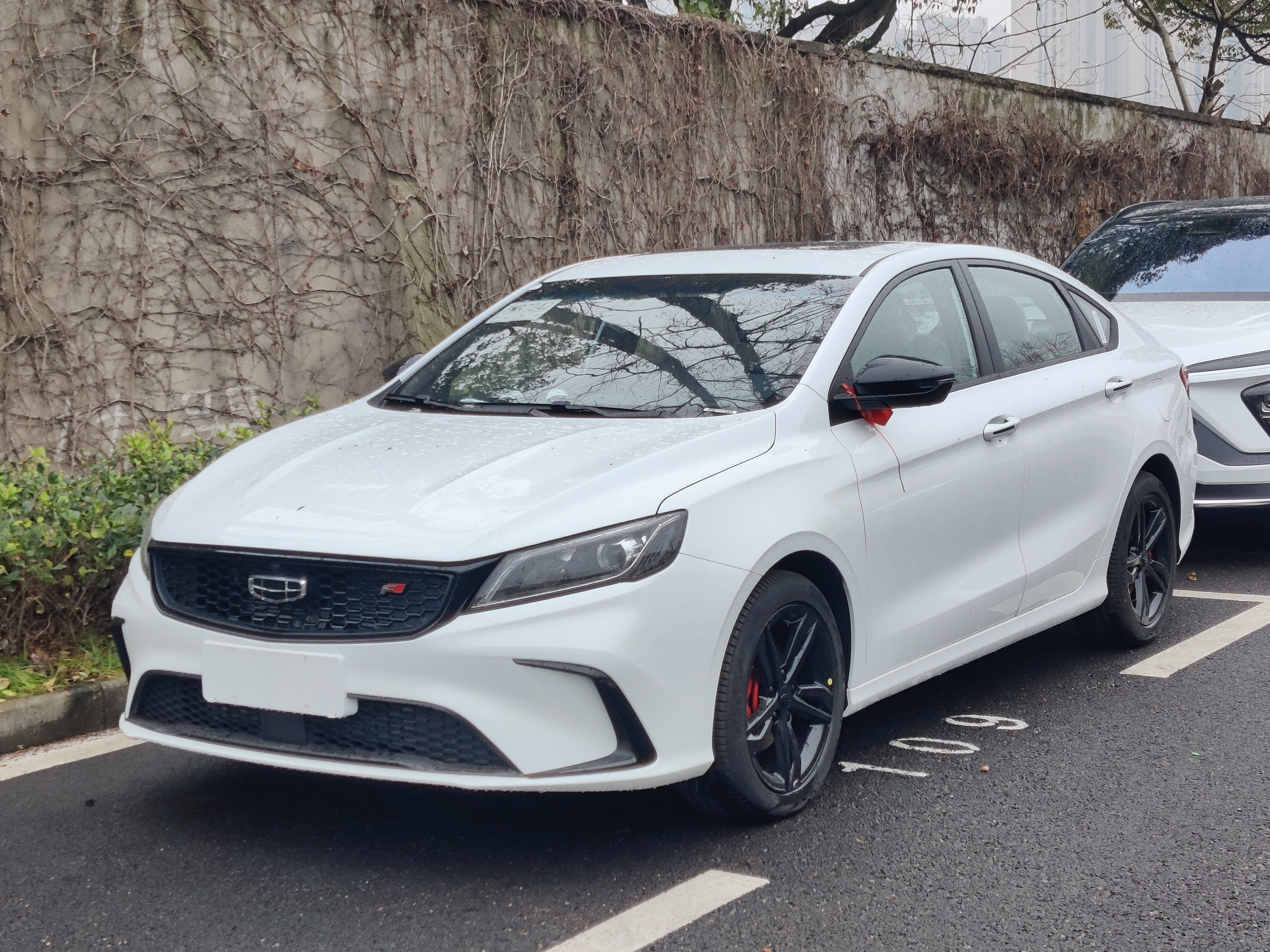
Geely Binrui F-Type Sport

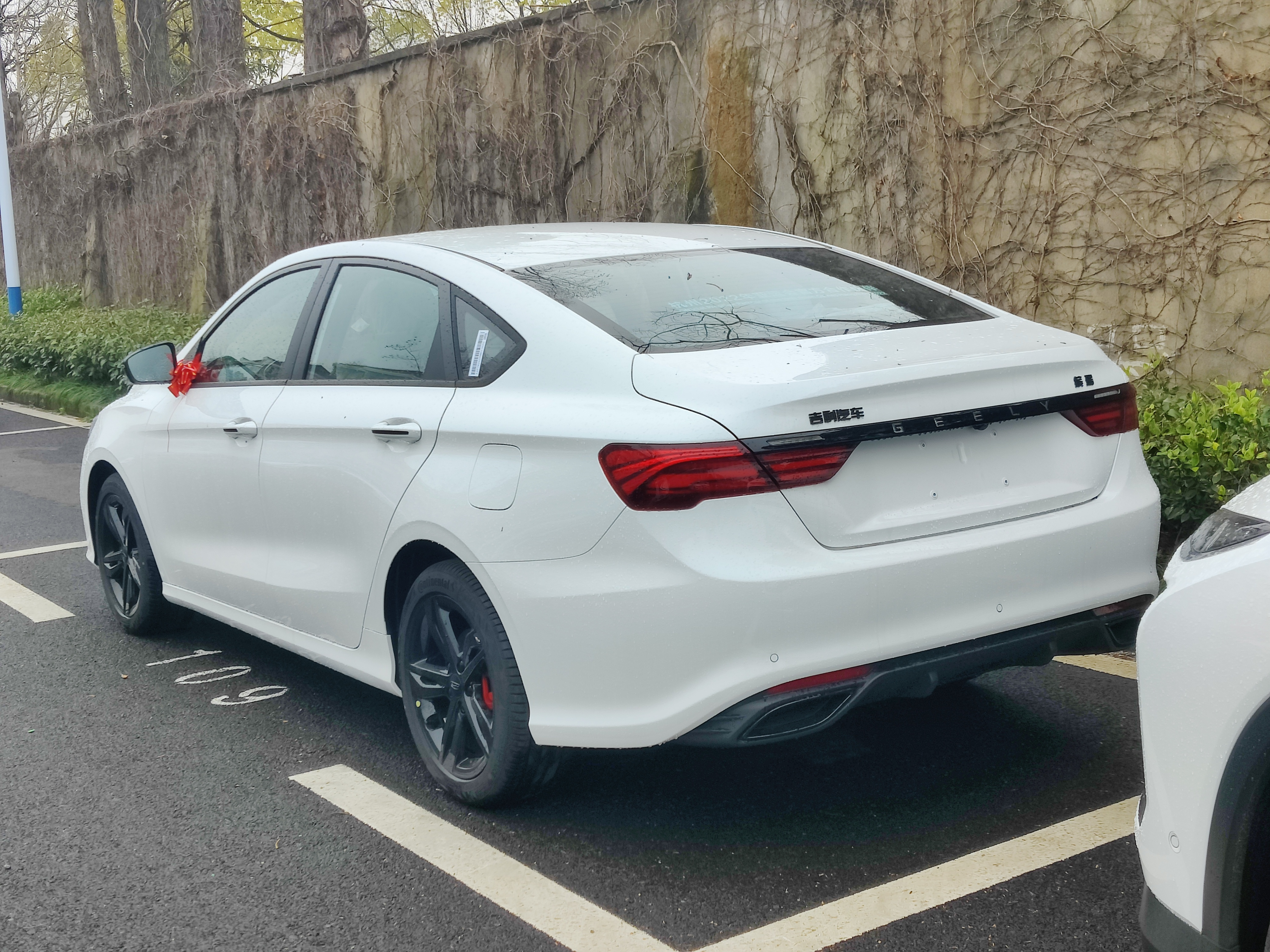
Rear view

=== Geely Binrui Cool ===
Codename FE-6-A3, the Geely Binrui Cool unveiled in March 2022 is the even more upmarket and more performance oriented variant compared to the F-Type Sport variant. The front and rear end were restyled to be more aggressive with Geely's "Racing Storm" design theme and the wheels are now equipped with 17-inch blacked-out rims and bright-colored brake calipers. Performance wise, the Binrui Cool features a 1.5 litre turbocharged four-cylinder petrol engine that develops 181 PS (179 hp; 133 kW) matched with a 7-speed dual-clutch gearbox.

The interior of the Binrui Cool features a 10.25-inch full LCD instrument cluster and a 12.3-inch central control screen are on the instrument panel. The gear lever of the Binrui Cool has also been upgraded to a racing, electronic gear lever.

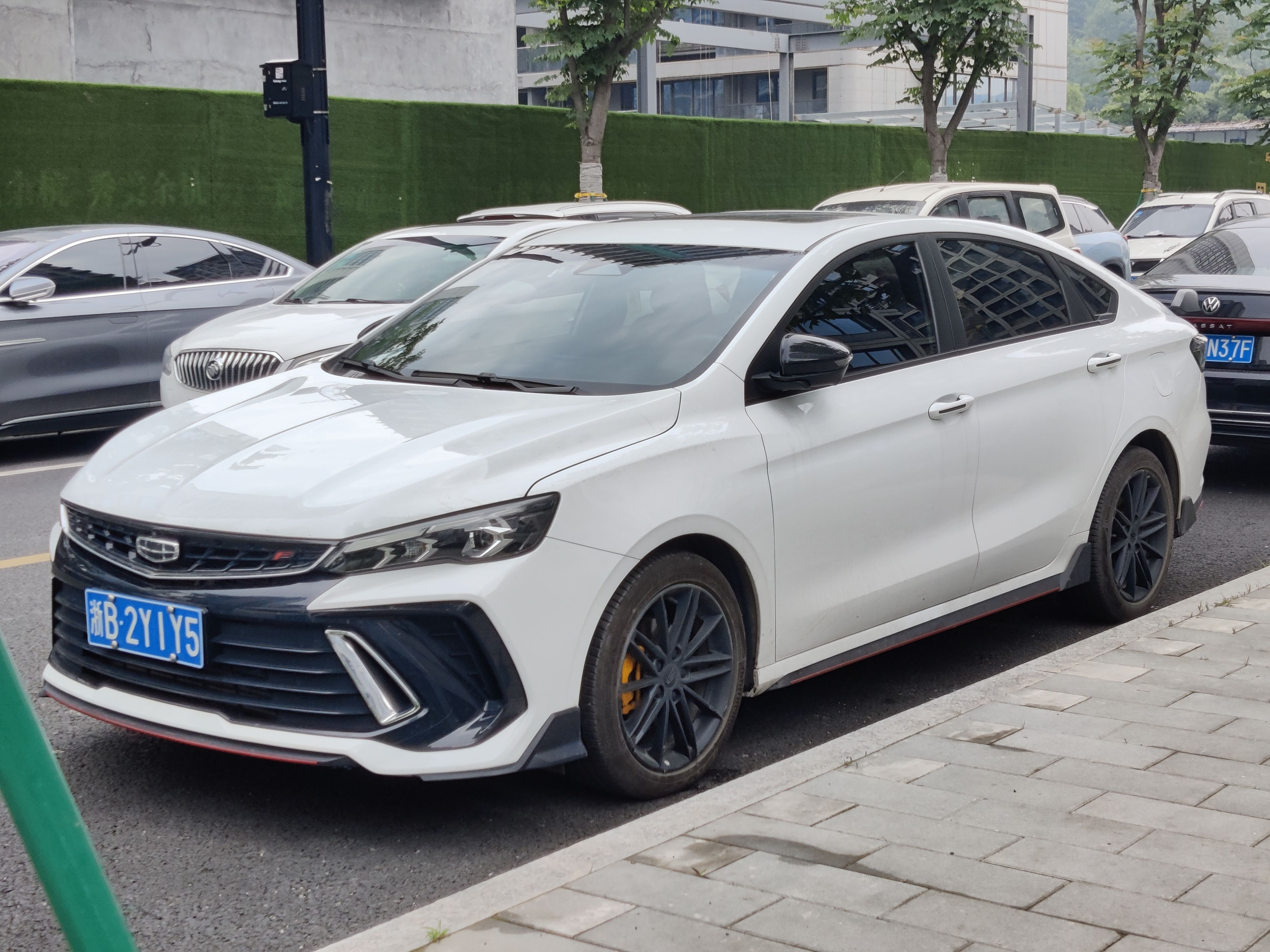
Geely Binrui Cool

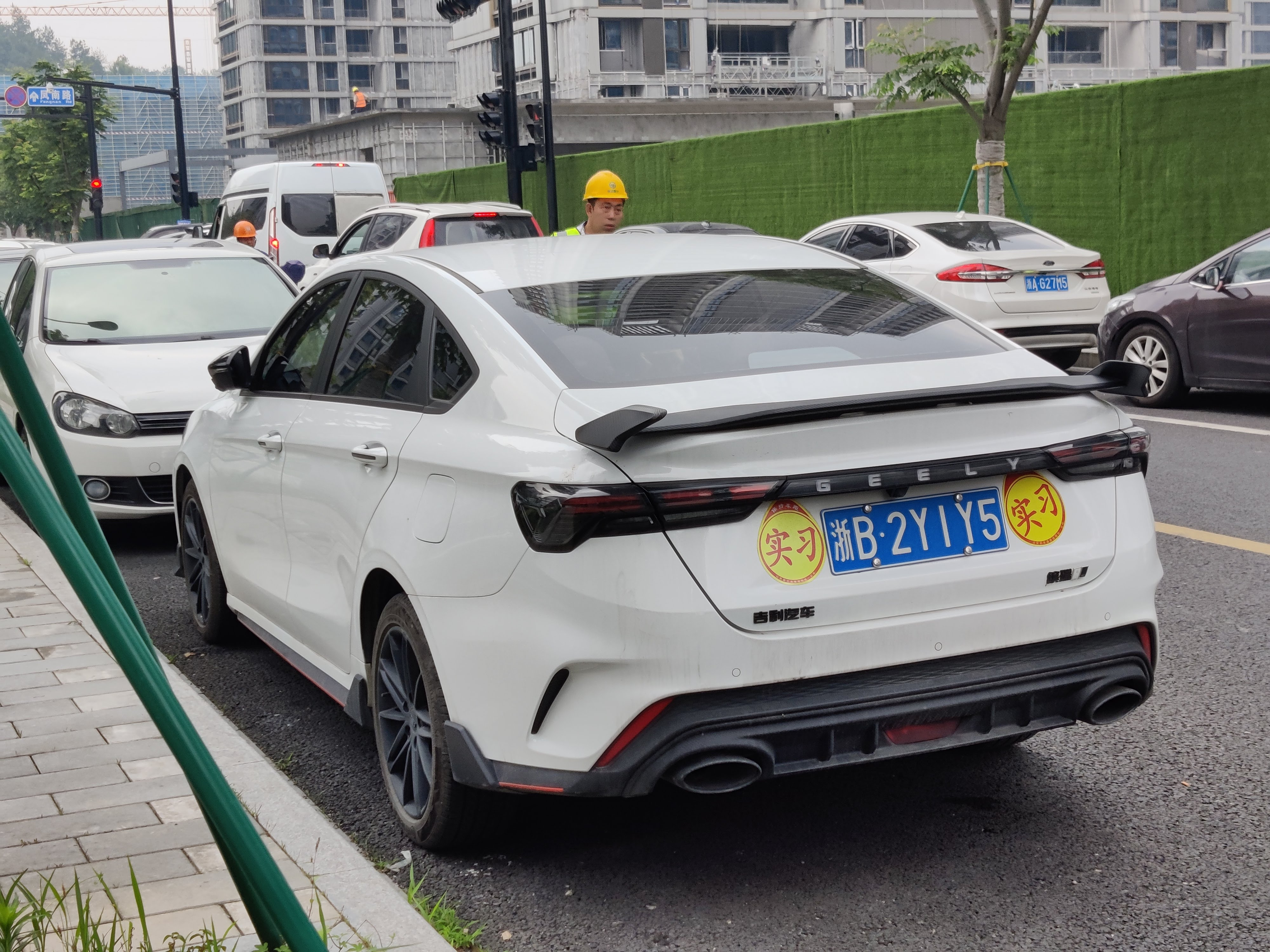
Rear view

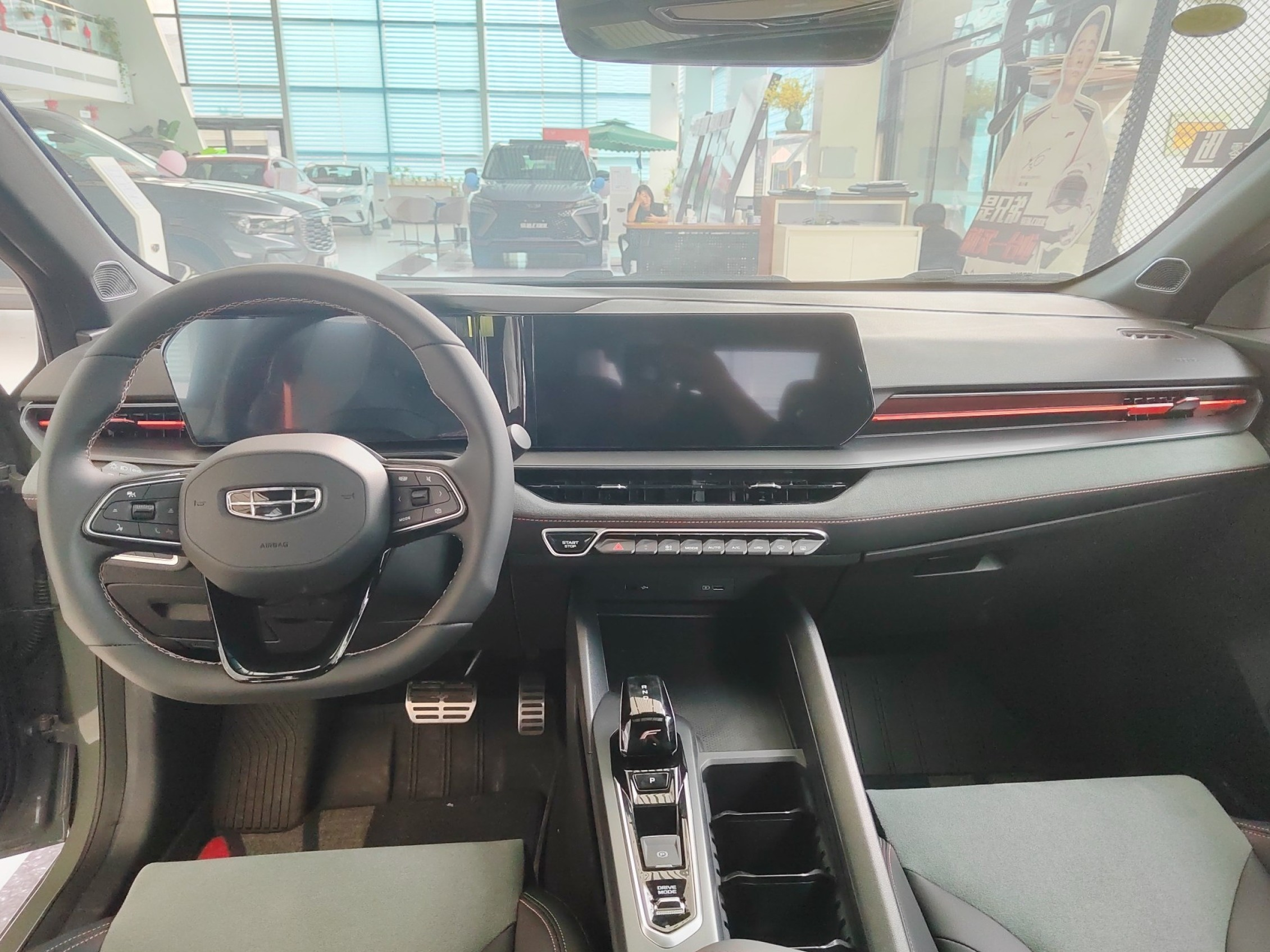
Interior

== Sales ==
Year	China
2018	33,084
2019	83,548
2020	72,360
2021	52,630
2022	
2023	35,872
2024	31,448
2025	12,723
