= Proton S70 =

Compact sedan

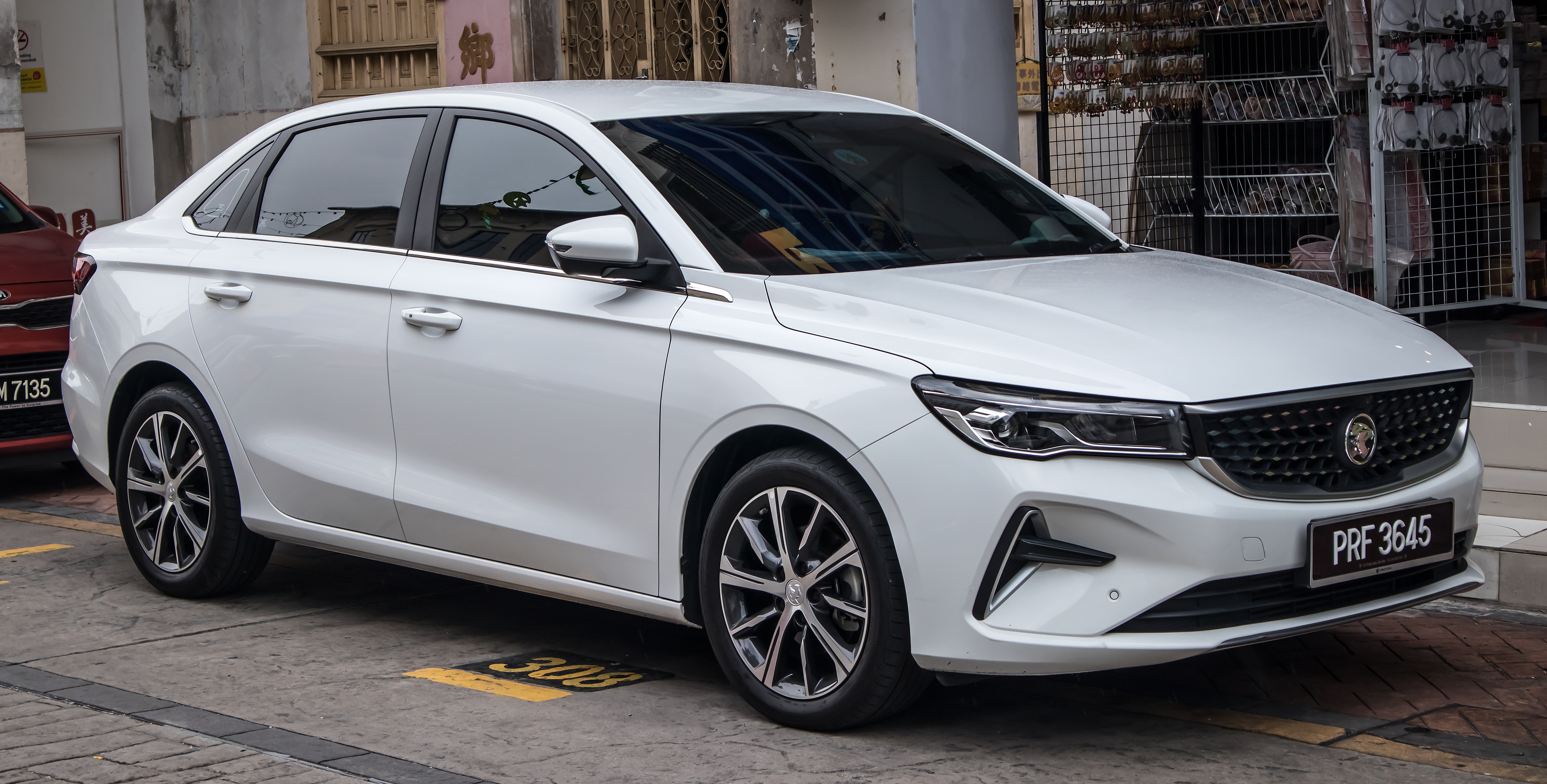

Overview
- Manufacturer: Proton
- Also called: Geely Emgrand
- Production: November 2023 – present
- Assembly: Malaysia: Proton City, Tanjung Malim, Perak (PTMSB)

Body and chassis
- Class: Compact car (C)
- Body style: 4-door sedan
- Layout: Front-engine, front-wheel-drive
- Platform: B-segment Modular Architecture (BMA)

Powertrain
- Engine: Petrol: 1.5 L JLH-3G15T PFI I3 turbo; 1.5 L BHE15-EFZ i-GT I4 turbo
- Power output: 110 kW (148 hp; 150 PS)
- Transmission: 7-speed dual-clutch

Dimensions
- Wheelbase: 2,627 mm (103.4 in)
- Length: 4,602 mm (181.2 in)
- Width: 1,809 mm (71.2 in)
- Height: 1,466 mm (57.7 in)
- Kerb weight: 1,300–1,319 kg (2,866–2,908 lb)

Chronology
- Predecessor: Proton Prevé; Proton Waja/Proton Wira (spiritual); Proton Persona (indirect)

The Proton S70 is a C-segment compact sedan produced by Malaysia's automotive company Proton in collaboration with Geely Auto. The vehicle was previewed on 20 November 2023, as it is marked the first sedan car produced by Proton following the 49.9% share acquisition by Geely in 2017. The S70 is marked as a successor to the Proton Prevé.

== Design and engineering ==
Set to be the first sedan from Proton and Geely partnership, the S70 is based on fourth-generation Geely Emgrand. It was developed on B-Segment Modular Architecture (BMA) platform developed by Geely. Proton has re-engineered the Emgrand with 260,000 man-hours R&D design engineer and has developed 453 new parts with the involvement of 283 local suppliers for the S70. The S70 has 145 knocked down (KD) parts and 24 in-house Proton developed parts.

Design

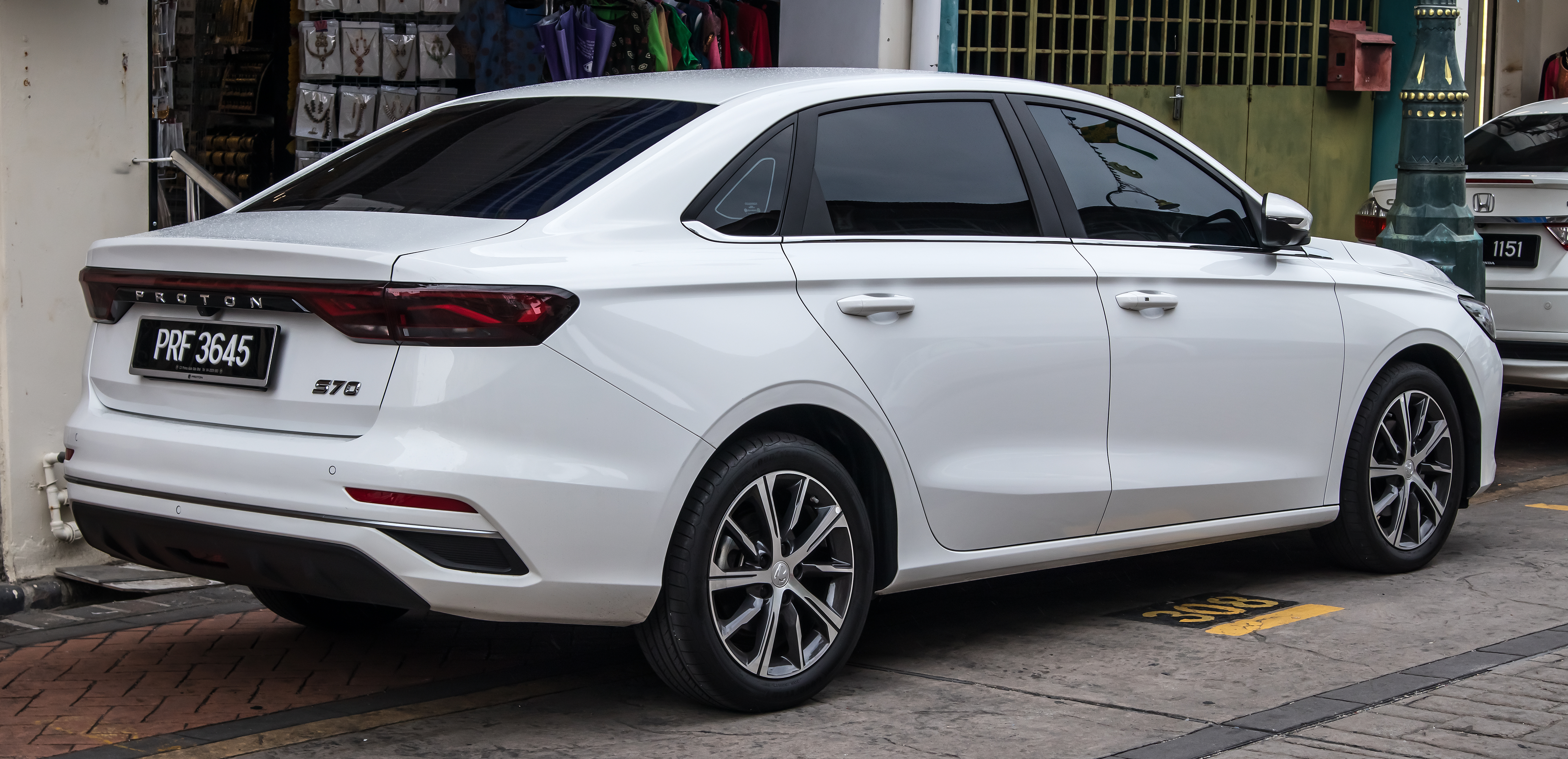
Rear view

The exterior design is similar from the donor car. It has coefficient drag of 0.27 cd, making it one of the lowest drag coefficient in Malaysia's c-segment market. The most striking element is the introduction of LED rear taillight-bar on its back which extend to the width of the car. Its rhythmic rear tail light bar for an attractive futuristic look and appear to be naturally ‘smoked’ even in daylight. One notable difference is the S70's front grille, which combines the ‘Infinite Weave’ and ‘Ethereal Bow’ with Proton's new round tiger badge in the middle of the grille. It also comes with 17-inch two-tone alloys wheel unlike the Emgrand (for Flagship and Flagship X variants), while 16-inch two-tone alloys wheel were offered for the Executive and Premium variant.

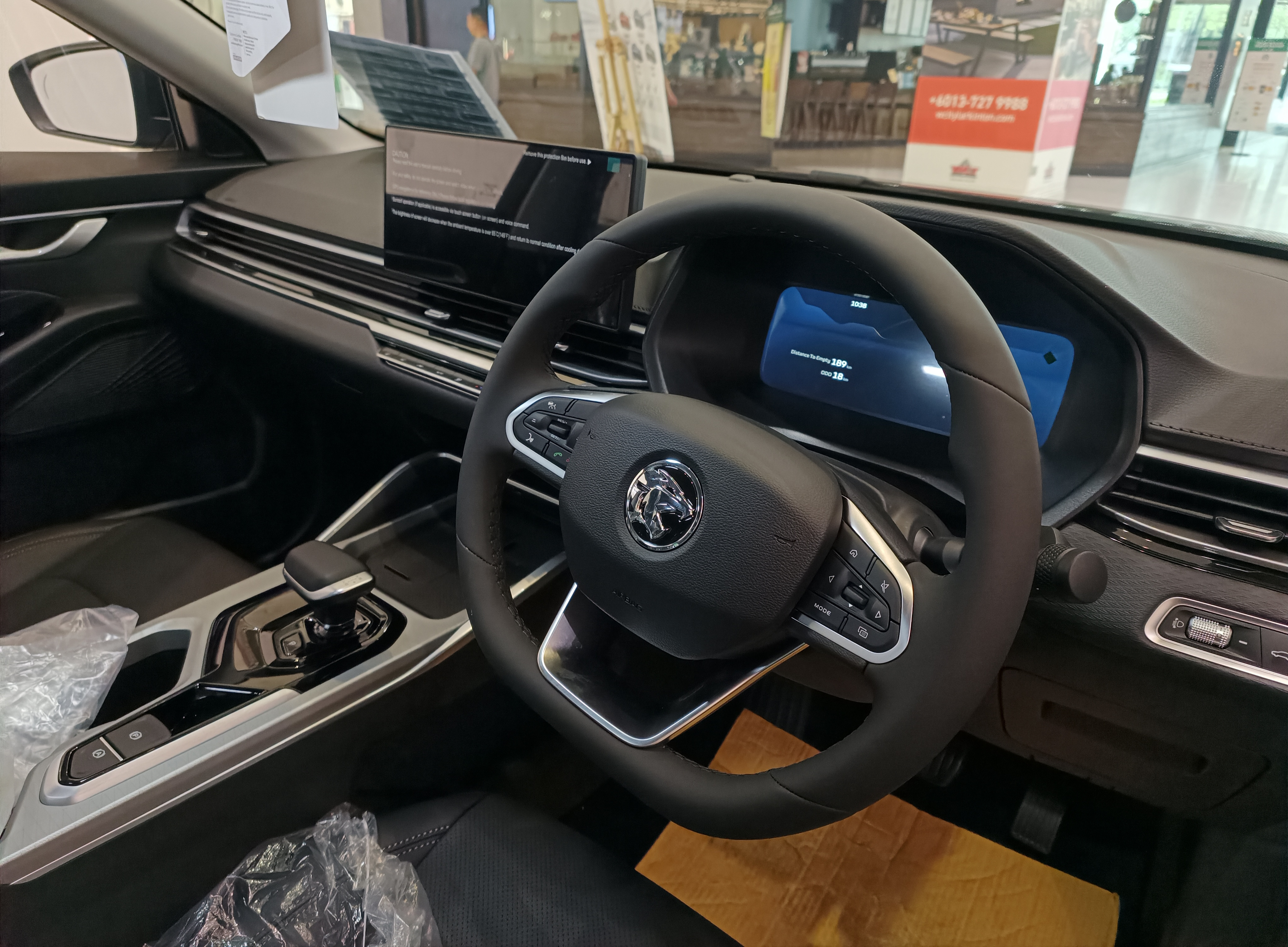
Interior

The S70 has leatherette seat tailored for comfort (for Premium, Flagship and Flagship X variants), while fabric seats are offered for the Executive variant. The Flagship and Flagship X variants cockpit has dual screen setup (10.3-inch meter, 12.3-inch infotainment with Hi Proton), wireless charger, powered driver's seat and rear air vent, while Executive and Premium variant cockpit offers 8.0-inch touchscreen infotainment unit and standard analog meter panel.

Engine

The engine is based on Volvo's GEP3 engine which is similar to Proton X70, X90 and X50. Proton's manufactured GEP3 engine in Tanjung Malim plant is used as the main powerhouse and tuned into 1.5-litre port-injected turbocharged engine paired with 7-speed dual clutch transmission, producing 150 PS (110kW; 148hp) @ 5,500 rpm.

In 2026, the MC1 update introduced a new 1.5-litre i-GT turbocharged four-cylinder engine producing 181 PS and 290 Nm of torque. Later in the same year, Proton added naturally aspirated Lite and Prime variants powered by a 1.5-litre i-GT four-cylinder engine rated at 120 PS and 150 Nm of torque and mated to a CVT transmission.

Launch

The first generation Proton S70 was unveiled at Proton's Tanjong Malim, Perak plant and began production on 1 November 2023. The S70 was launched on 28 November 2023, with four variants are offered in Executive, Premium, Flagship and Flagship X. At launch, the S70 was publicly benchmarked against the Honda City and Toyota Vios, suggesting the S70 price range in B-Segment car price.

=== 2026 updates (MC1) ===
On 12 February 2026, Proton introduced the first minor change (MC1) update for the S70. The update replaced the original 1.5-litre turbocharged three-cylinder engine with a new 1.5-litre i-GT turbocharged four-cylinder engine producing 181 PS and 290 Nm of torque, paired with a seven-speed dual-clutch transmission. The update also introduced revised exterior styling, new wheel designs, wireless Apple CarPlay and Android Auto connectivity, and additional equipment across the range.

=== 2026 update (MC2) ===
In September 2026, Proton announced the S70 Lite and S70 Prime variants as part of the MC2 line-up expansion. The new entry-level variants were positioned below the existing turbocharged models and were introduced as a more affordable alternative within the S70 range.

The Lite and Prime variants are powered by a naturally aspirated version of the 1.5-litre i-GT four-cylinder engine producing 120 PS and 150 Nm of torque. Unlike the turbocharged variants that use a seven-speed dual-clutch transmission, the naturally aspirated models are equipped with a continuously variable transmission (CVT).

The Lite variant features 16-inch alloy wheels, halogen headlamps, fabric upholstery and a simplified equipment list, while retaining features such as wireless Apple CarPlay and Android Auto, six airbags and selected driver assistance systems.

== Etymology ==
The "-70" suffix is correlated to it being a C-segment vehicle, similar to the Proton X70 despite being based on a B-segment Modular Architecture (BMA) platform which would entail a "-50" suffix. The Proton S70 was thought to be named S50 several months before being unveiled due to it being based after the B-segment Geely Emgrand.

== Powertrain ==
The S70 comes with 1.5-litre port-injected three-cylinder unit with turbocharger coded JLH-3G15T paired with a 7-speed DCT, it is the same engine used on the Proton X50. In comparison, the fourth generation Geely Emgrand which the S70 is based on, only uses a 1.5-litre four-cylinder naturally aspirated engine unit coded JLC-4G15B paired with a CVT or a 5-speed manual transmission.

In February 2026, the S70 received its first minor change (MC1) update, replacing the JLH-3G15T with the Direct injection BHE15TD 1.5-litre i-GT turbocharged four-cylinder engine producing 181 PS and 290 Nm of torque, while retaining the seven-speed DCT.

In September 2026, Proton introduced the naturally aspirated S70 Lite and S70 Prime variants as part of the MC2 line-up expansion. These variants are powered by a BHE15-CFN 1.5-litre i-GT naturally aspirated four-cylinder engine producing 120 PS and 150 Nm of torque, same engine used in Proton Saga and paired with a continuously variable transmission (CVT) by Wanliyang (WLY) instead of Punch Powertrain in saga.

Petrol engine
| Model | Engine | Power | Torque | Transmission |
|---|---|---|---|---|
| 1.5T PFI | 1,477 cc (90.1 cu in) I3 turbocharged JLH-3G15T | 150 PS (110 kW; 148 hp) @ 5,500 rpm | 226 N⋅m (23.0 kg⋅m; 167 lb⋅ft) @ 1,750–4,000 rpm | 7-speed wet DCT |
| 1.5T GDI MC1 | 1,499 cc (91.5 cu in) I4 turbocharged BHE15TD | 181 PS (133 kW; 179 hp) @ 5,500 rpm | 290 N⋅m (29.6 kg⋅m; 214 lb⋅ft) @ 2,000–3,500 rpm | 7-speed wet DCT |
| 1.5 i-GT MC2 | 1,499 cc BHE15-CFN DOHC I4 | 120 PS ( 87 kW; 118 hp) @ 6,100 rpm | 150 N·m (15.3 kgf·m; 110.6 lb·ft) @ 6,100 rpm | 8-speed CVT |

== Safety ==
Unlike the Emgrand, the S70 has 6 SRS airbags, 13 active safety system paired with 12 sensors. The comprehensive ADAS suite, which are offered in the Flagship and Flagship X variant, includes Autonomous Emergency Braking (AEB), Forward Collision Warning (FCW), Rear Collision Warning (RCW), Adaptive Cruise Control (ACC) with Stop & Go, Lane Departure Warning (LDW), Lane Departure Prevention (LDP), Lane Centering Control, Traffic Sign Information (TSI), Intelligent High Beam Control (IHBC), Lane Change Assist (LCA), Door Opening Warning and Rear Cross Traffic Alert. The Flagship and Flagship X variant also comes with Tire Pressure Monitoring System (TPMS) and 360-degree camera with 3D display.

The Premium and Executive variant offers only Rear Collision Warning, Lane Change Assist, Door Opening Warning and Rear Cross Traffic Alert as standard ADAS.

In 2026, the MC1 update retained the six-airbag configuration and ADAS package on higher-specification variants while introducing additional equipment and connectivity features across the range.

The naturally aspirated S70 Lite and S70 Prime variants introduced under the MC2 line-up expansion retained six airbags, rear parking sensors, a reverse camera and a rear side radar system supporting Blind Spot Detection (BSD), Lane Change Assist (LCA), Rear Cross Traffic Alert (RCTA), Door Opening Warning (DOW) and Rear Collision Warning (RCW). However, features such as Autonomous Emergency Braking (AEB) and Adaptive Cruise Control (ACC) remained exclusive to the higher-specification turbocharged variants.

Proton S70 has been awarded a 5-star safety rating by ASEAN NCAP in October 2023.

ASEAN NCAP test results Proton S70 (2023)
| Test | Points |
|---|---|
| Overall: | 5 /5 stars |
| Adult occupant: | 36.46 |
| Child occupant: | 17.02 |
| Safety assist: | 15.71 |
| Motorcyclist Safety: | 13.75 |

== Sales ==
| Year | Malaysia (Note: Figures based on registration) |
|---|---|
| 2023 | 105 |
| 2024 (Note: https://theedgemalaysia.com/node/740027) | 19,182 |
