= Gleagle GS-CC =

Gleagle sports car concept

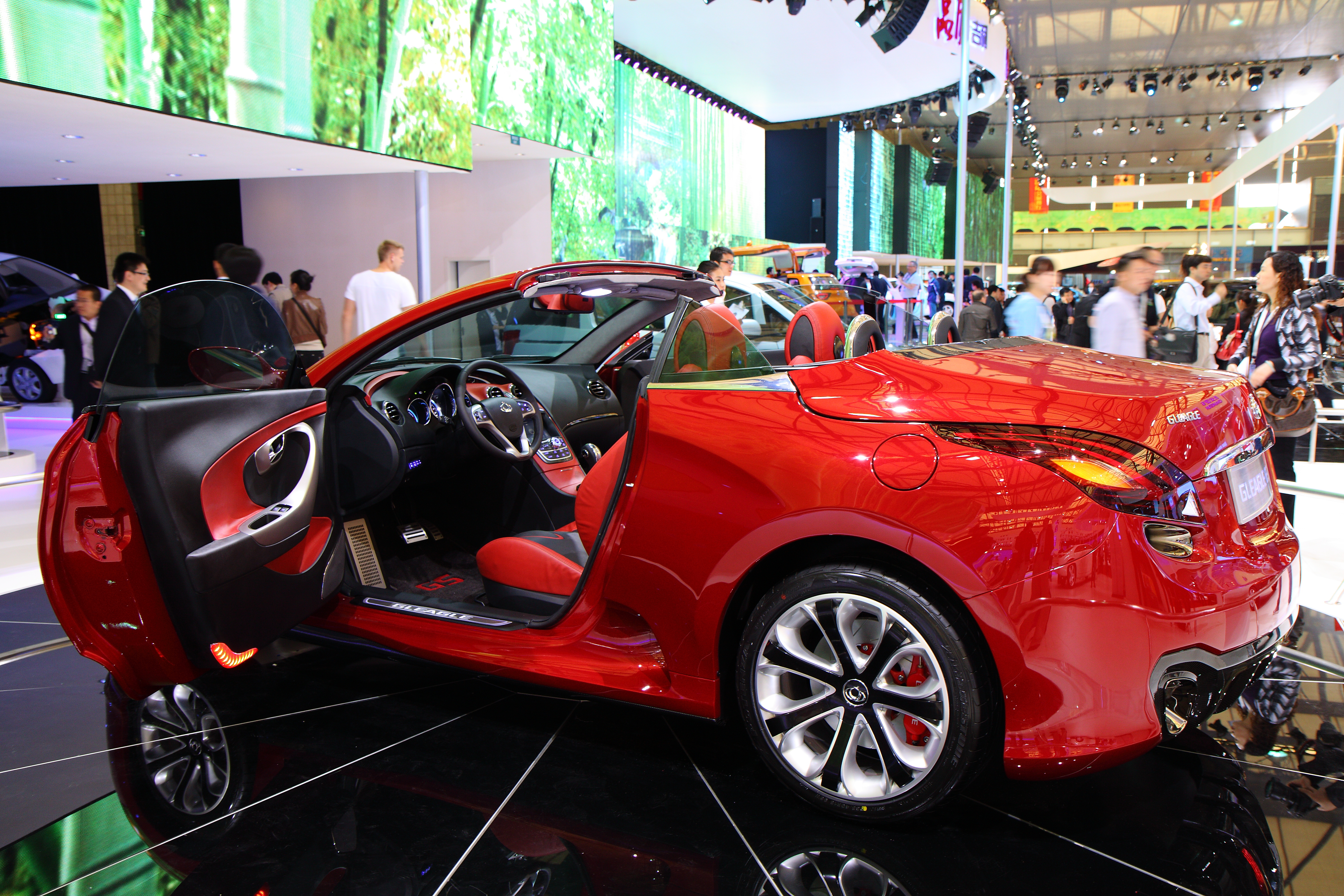
- 2011 Gleagle GS-CC Convertible at Auto Shanghai 2011

Overview
- Manufacturer: Geely Auto
- Production: 2011 (2 produced; one coupe and one convertible)

Body and chassis
- Class: Sports car (S)
- Body style: 2-door coupe 2-door convertible

Powertrain
- Engine: 1.3L 4-cylinder engine
- Transmission: 6-speed manual

The Gleagle GS-CC is a 2-door convertible/coupe sports car concept revealed by Gleagle, a marque by Chinese automobile manufacturer Geely Auto, at the 2011 Auto Shanghai show.

== Overview ==
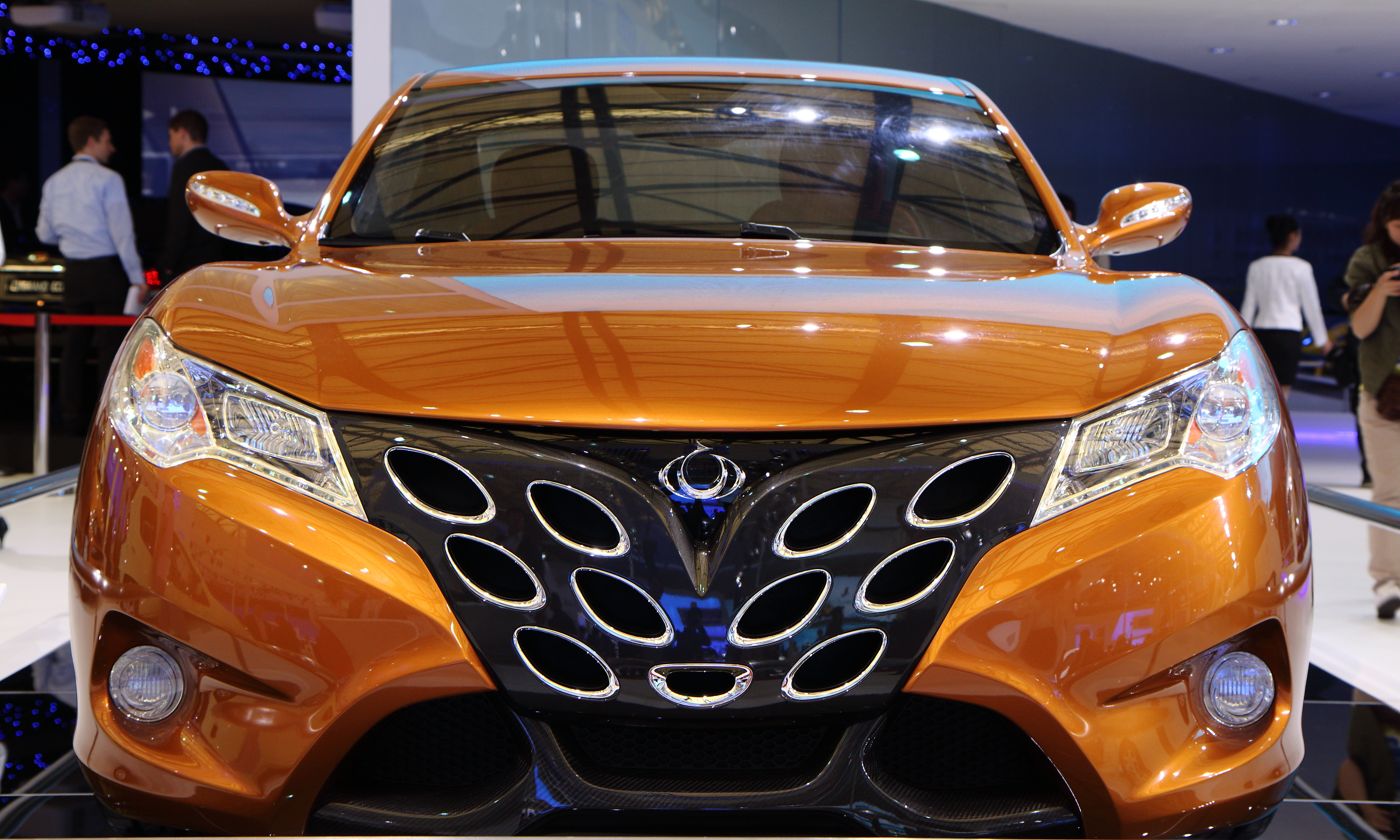
2011 Gleagle GS-CC Coupe at Auto Shanghai (front)

The Gleagle GS-CC concepts were revealed at Auto Shanghai on April 21, 2011 in Shanghai, China, alongside 5 other concept cars. The two variants of the 2-door sports car concept are a coupe painted in orange and a convertible painted in red. Compared to similar coupe/convertible sports cars on sale at the time such as the Nissan 370Z, (Note: The NA-spec 370Z uses a 3.7L VQ37VHR and produces 332 hp.) the GS-CC has a small 1.3L 4-cylinder engine, producing only 129 hp. The Gleagle GS-CC uses a 6-speed manual transmission.

=== Production model ===
At the 2011 Auto Shanghai show, Geely stated that the Gleagle GS-CC would go into production in 2014. However, this car was never produced.
