= B-segment Modular Architecture =

B-segment Modular Architecture (BMA)

Overview
- Manufacturer: Geely
- Production: 2018–present

Body and chassis
- Class: Subcompact car / Supermini (B); Compact car (C-segment)
- Layout: Front-engine, front-wheel-drive; Front-engine, all-wheel-drive

Chronology
- Predecessor: FE platform

The B-segment Modular Architecture (BMA) is a global compact unibody automobile platform developed by Geely Auto. The architecture can be used to develop cars with a wheelbase between 2,550–2,700 mm (100.4–106.3 in) and with wheel track wheels ranging from 1,500–1,600 mm (59.1–63.0 in). Its name derived from the larger Compact Modular Architecture (CMA) platform. While the CMA platform was jointly developed by Geely and Volvo, the BMA platform is independently developed by Geely.

The use of BMA allows for higher economies of scale, as all vehicles based on BMA will have a high rate of commonality with shared parts and components reaching 70 percent, reducing costs and time needed for component testing. With the use of BMA, vehicle development time may be shortened from over 36 months on average to just 18 to 24 months.

The platform is claimed to be developed from 70 percent high-strength steel and 20 percent hot-formed steel, and was designed to exceed Europe standards of 5-star safety norms. The BMA is also compatible with L2 autonomous drive and L3 autonomous drive in the future.

== Applications ==
BMA
| Model | Code | Production period | Notes |
|---|---|---|---|
| Geely Binrui | A06 | 2018–2026 | Geely Binrui |
| Geely Binyue/Coolray | SX11 | 2018–present | Geely Binyue |
| Proton X50 | | 2020–present | Proton X50 |
| Geely Boyue/Cityray | G426 | 2023–present | Geely Boyue |
| Geely Emgrand | SS11 | 2021–present | Geely Emgrand |
| Proton S70 | | 2023–present | Proton S70 |
| Geely Icon | SX12 | 2020–present | Geely Icon |
| Lynk & Co 06 | BX11 | 2020–present | Lynk & Co 06 |

=== BMA Evo ===
- Lynk & Co 06 EM-P (2023–present)
- Geely Emgrand (SS21) (2025–present)
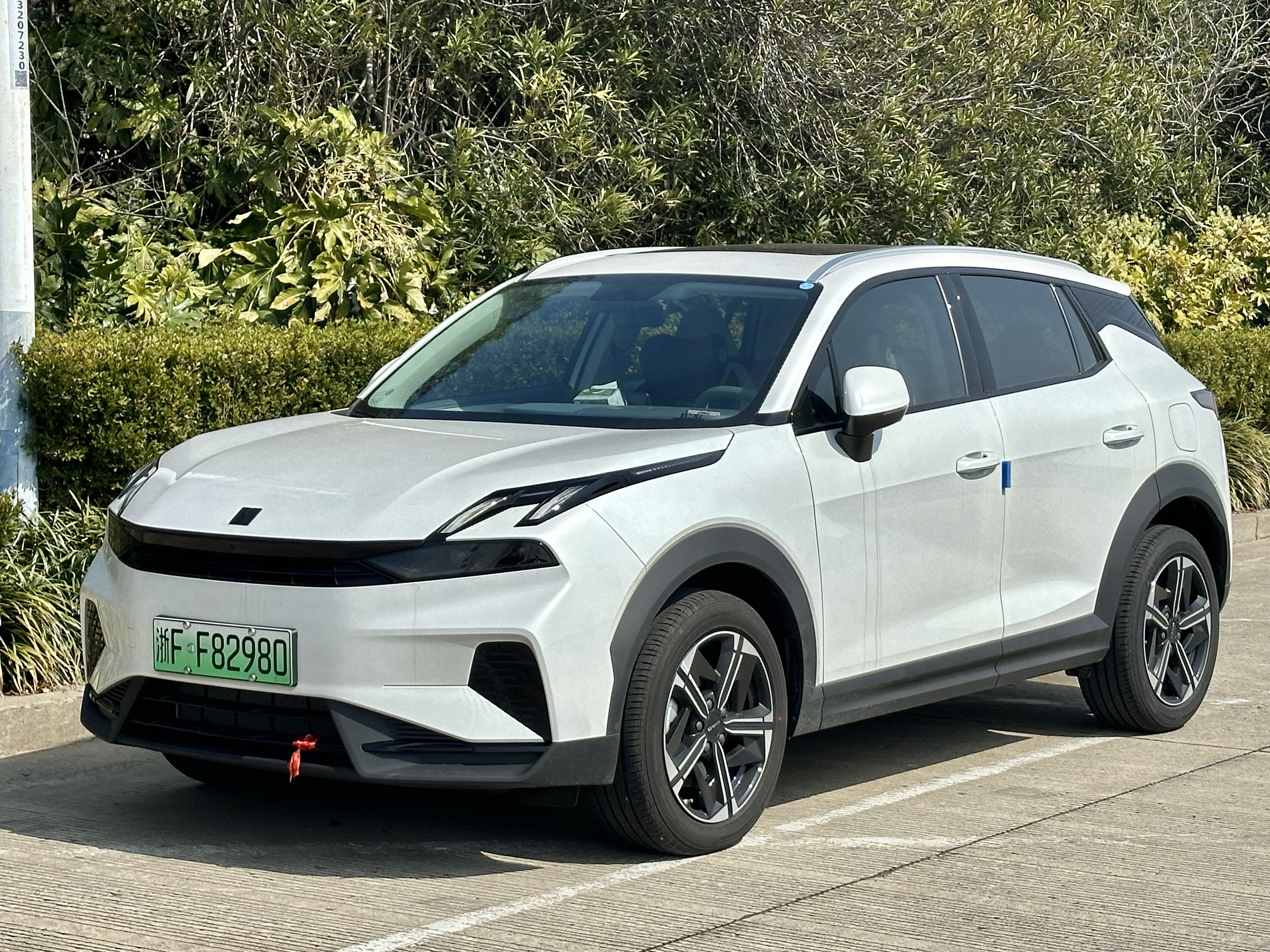
Lynk & Co 06 EM-P

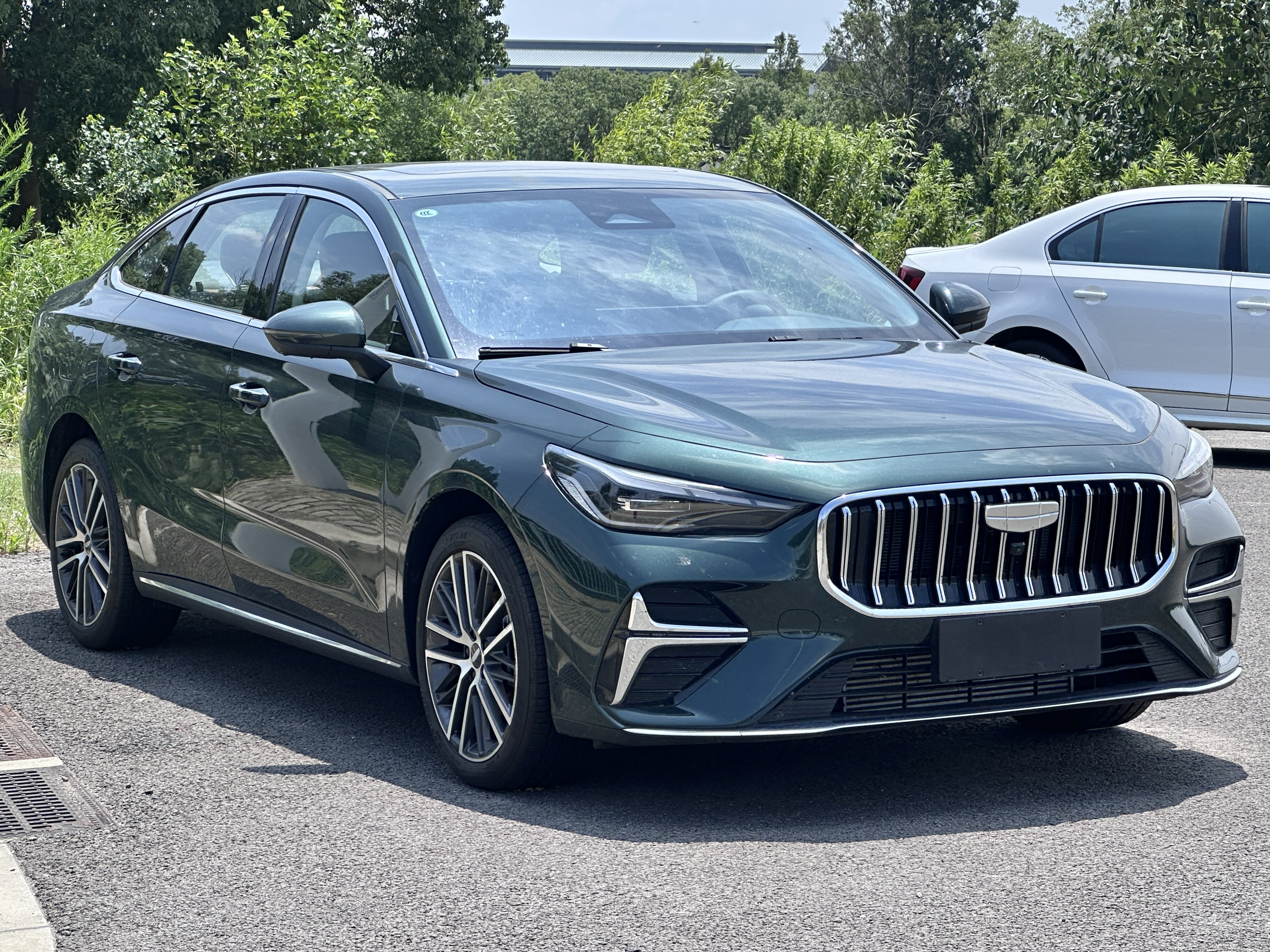
Geely Emgrand (SS21)

== See also ==
- SPA – Scalable Product Architecture platform
- SEA – Sustainable Experience Architecture platform
- GEA – Global Intelligent New Energy Architecture
- CMA – Compact Modular Architecture platform
  - SMA – Scalable Modular Architecture
