= Lynk & Co 06 =

Chinese subcompact crossover SUV

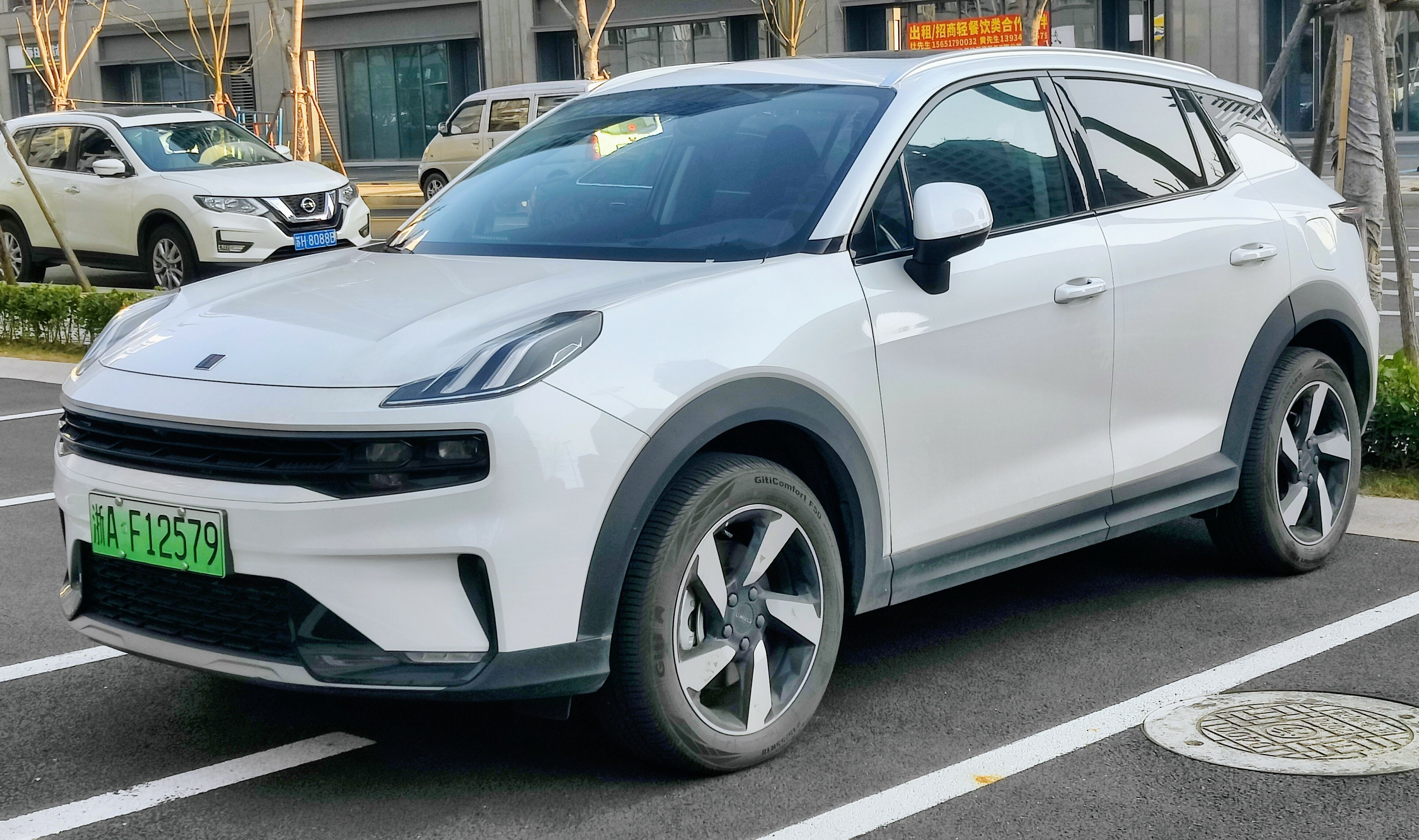

Overview
- Manufacturer: Lynk & Co (Geely)
- Model code: BX11
- Production: 2020–present
- Model years: 2020–present
- Assembly: China: Chengdu, Sichuan (Longquanyi Plant)
- Designer: Jon Rådbrink, Alessia Ombrella, Ignacio Fernández Miño

Body and chassis
- Class: Subcompact crossover SUV (B)
- Body style: 5-door SUV
- Layout: Front-engine, front-wheel-drive
- Platform: Geely BMA platform Geely BMA Evo platform (EM-P)
- Related: Geely Binyue; Geely Icon; Proton X50

Powertrain
- Engine: Petrol: 1.5 L turbo I3; Petrol plug-in hybrid: 1.5 L BHE15 I3; 1.5 L JLH-3G15TD turbo I3; 1.5 L BHE15-BFD I4
- Transmission: 7-speed DCT
- Battery: 9.1 kWh LFP SVOLT; 15.5 kWh NMC VREMT; 19.09 kWh LFP SVOLT
- Electric range: 44–102 km (27–63 mi) (WLTC); 56–126 km (35–78 mi) (CLTC)
- Plug-in charging: 32 kW (DC)

Dimensions
- Wheelbase: 2,640 mm (103.9 in)
- Length: 4,340 mm (170.9 in)
- Width: 1,820 mm (71.7 in)
- Height: 1,625 mm (64.0 in)
- Curb weight: 1,426–1,720 kg (3,144–3,792 lb)

The Lynk & Co 06 (Chinese: 领克06; pinyin: Lǐng kè 06) is a subcompact crossover SUV manufactured by Chinese-Swedish automaker Lynk & Co that slots below Lynk & Co 01. It was based on the same platform as the Geely Binyue subcompact crossover, and went on sale on 7 September 2020.

== Overview ==
The Lynk & Co 06 crossover was marketed as a subcompact crossover and was positioned below the Lynk & Co 02. The Lynk & Co 06 offers two powertrain choices including a petrol engine and a plug-in hybrid system. The first to launch is a 1.5-liter three-cylinder turbocharged engine producing 175 hp (130 kW; 177 PS) and 265 N⋅m (195 lb⋅ft; 27 kg⋅m) of torque, mated to a seven-speed dual-clutch gearbox. A 187-horsepower (139 kW; 190 PS) plug-in hybrid version of the Lynk & Co 06 combining the 1.5-litre turbocharged three-cylinder engine with an 80-horsepower (60 kW; 81 PS) electric motor and a battery pack will follow.

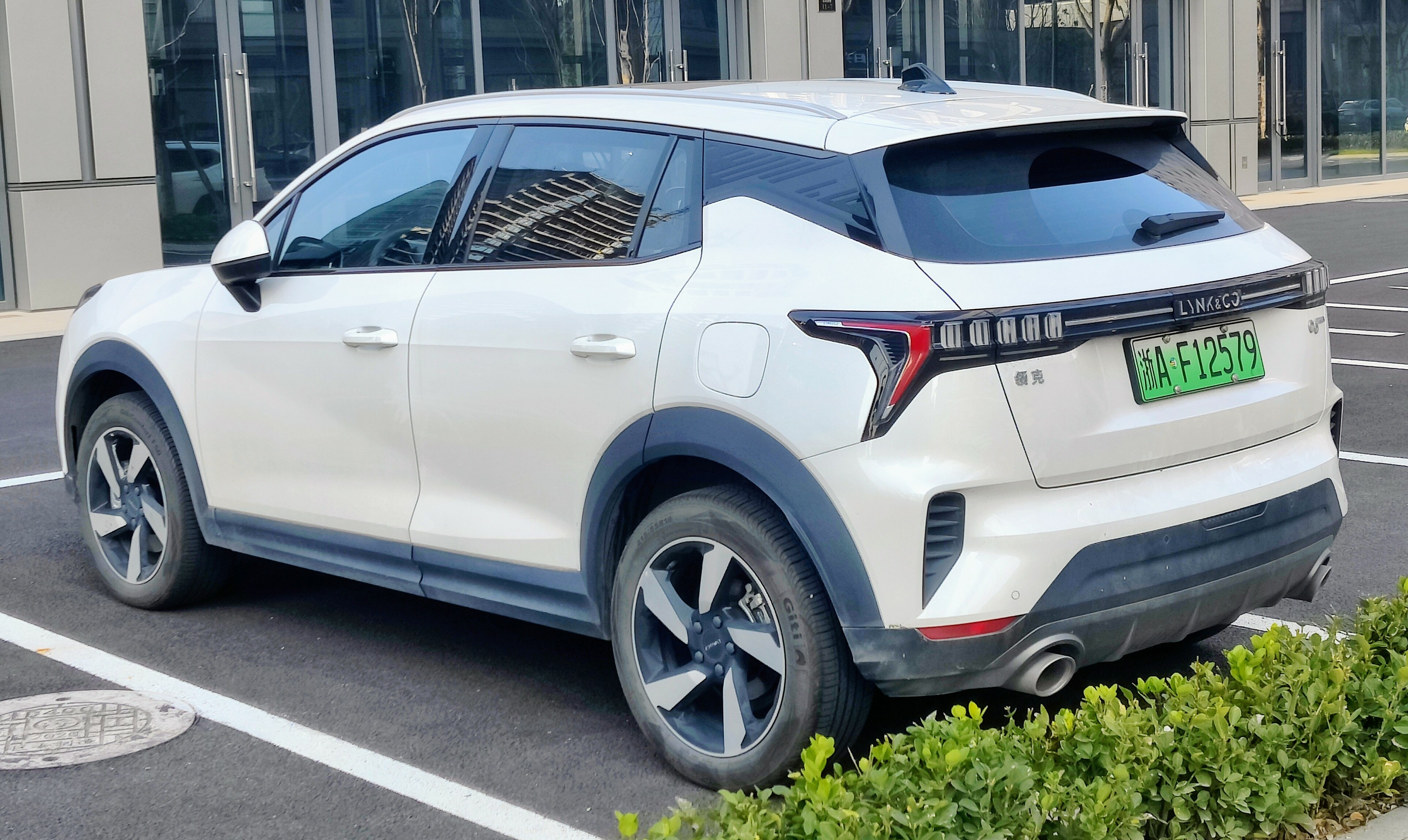
Rear view

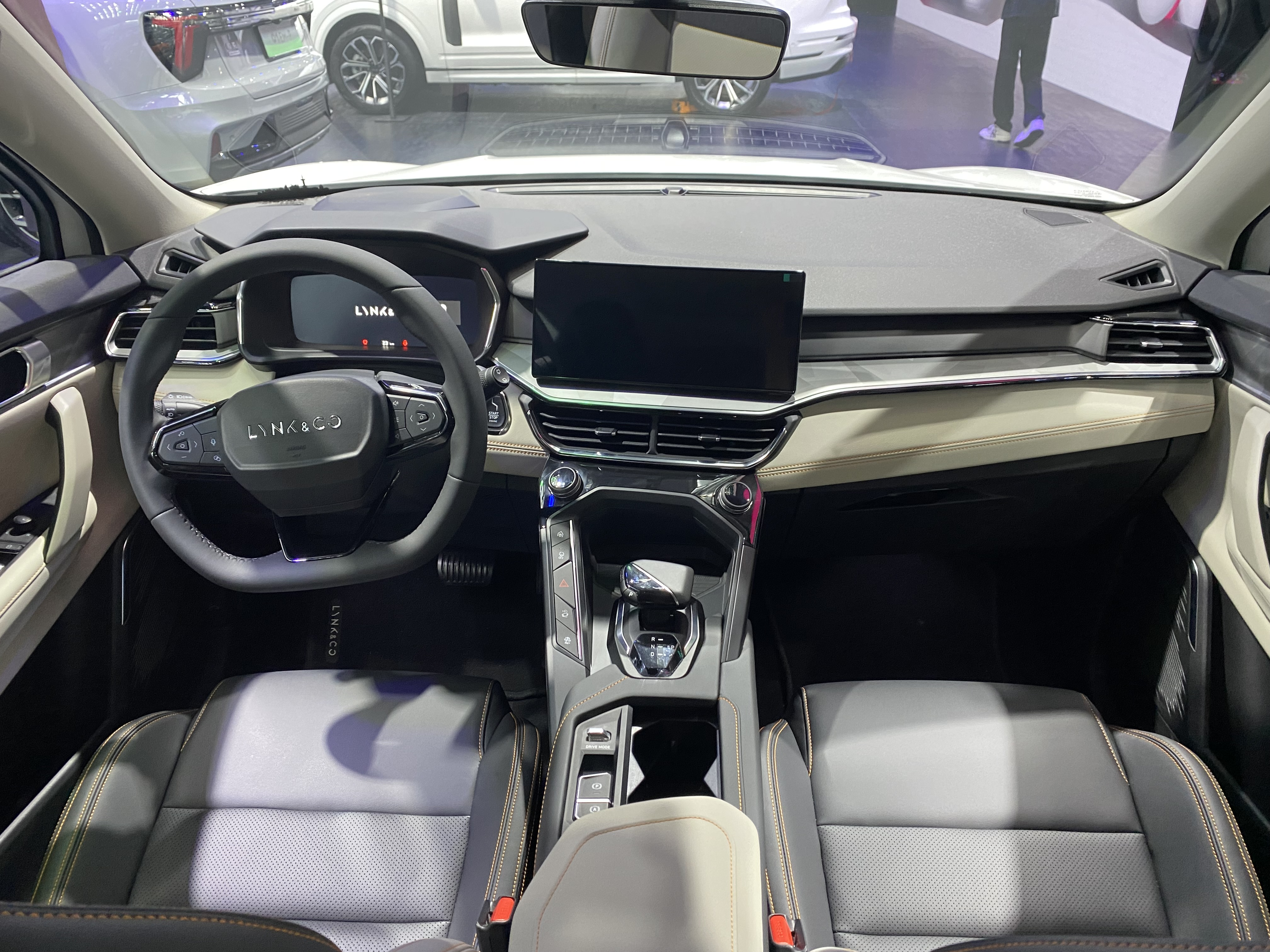
Interior

== Lynk & Co 06 EM-P ==
In July 2023, the Lynk & Co 06 EM-P was unveiled. The vehicle uses the second generation Lynk & Co design language and is equipped with the EM-P powertrain system, featuring a P1 + P3 dual-motor layout. It is powered by BHE15 naturally-aspirated 1.5-liter engine, delivering the maximum power of 88 kW (118 hp; 120 PS), pairing with 3DHT transmission. The power out of the P3 motor is 160 kW (215 hp; 218 PS), and the combined maximum power output and torque reaches 220 kW (295 hp; 299 PS) and 568 N⋅m (419 lb⋅ft). The vehicle carries a 19.09 kWh battery, providing an electric range of 102 km (63 mi).

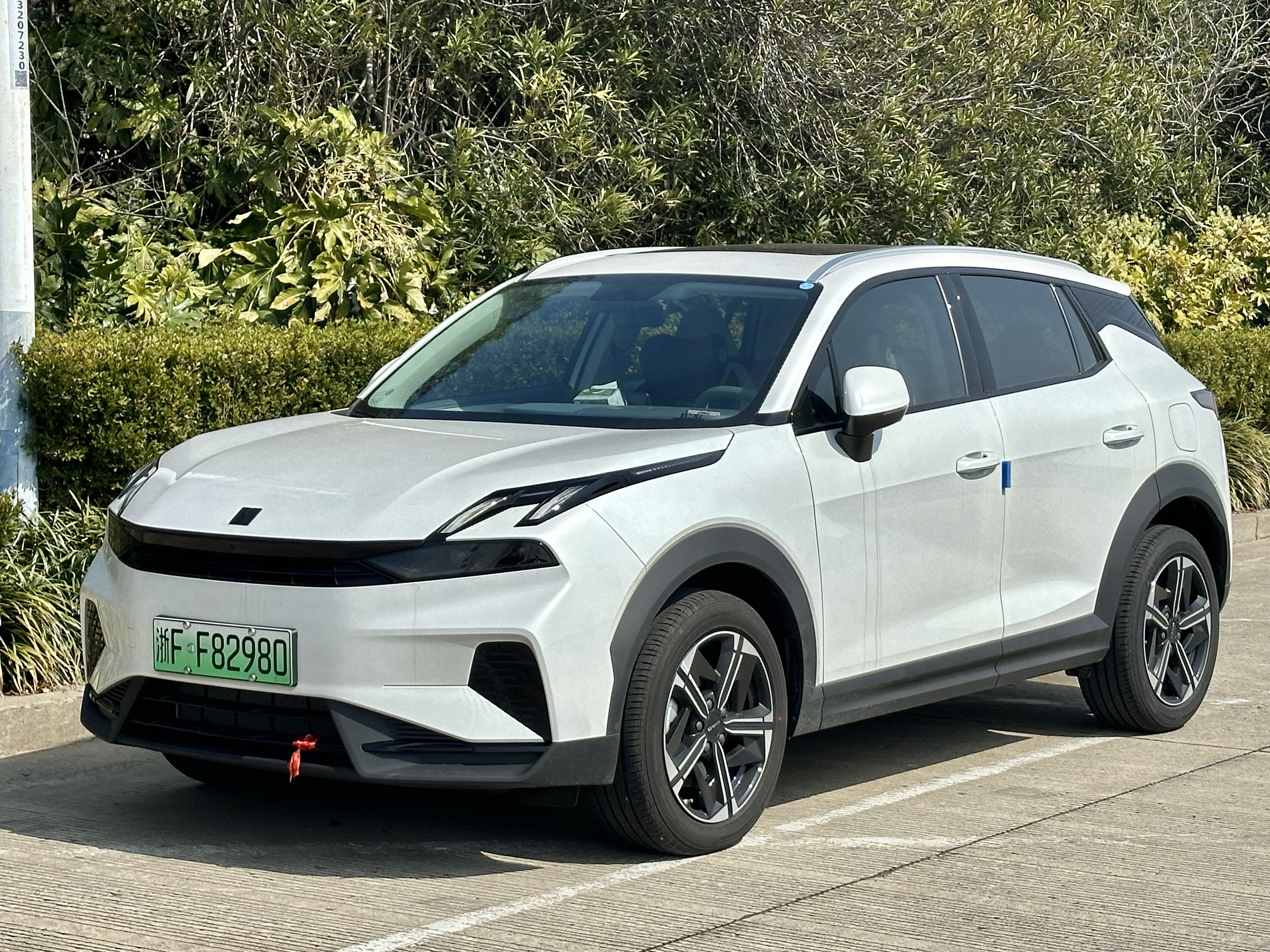
Lynk & Co 06 EM-P

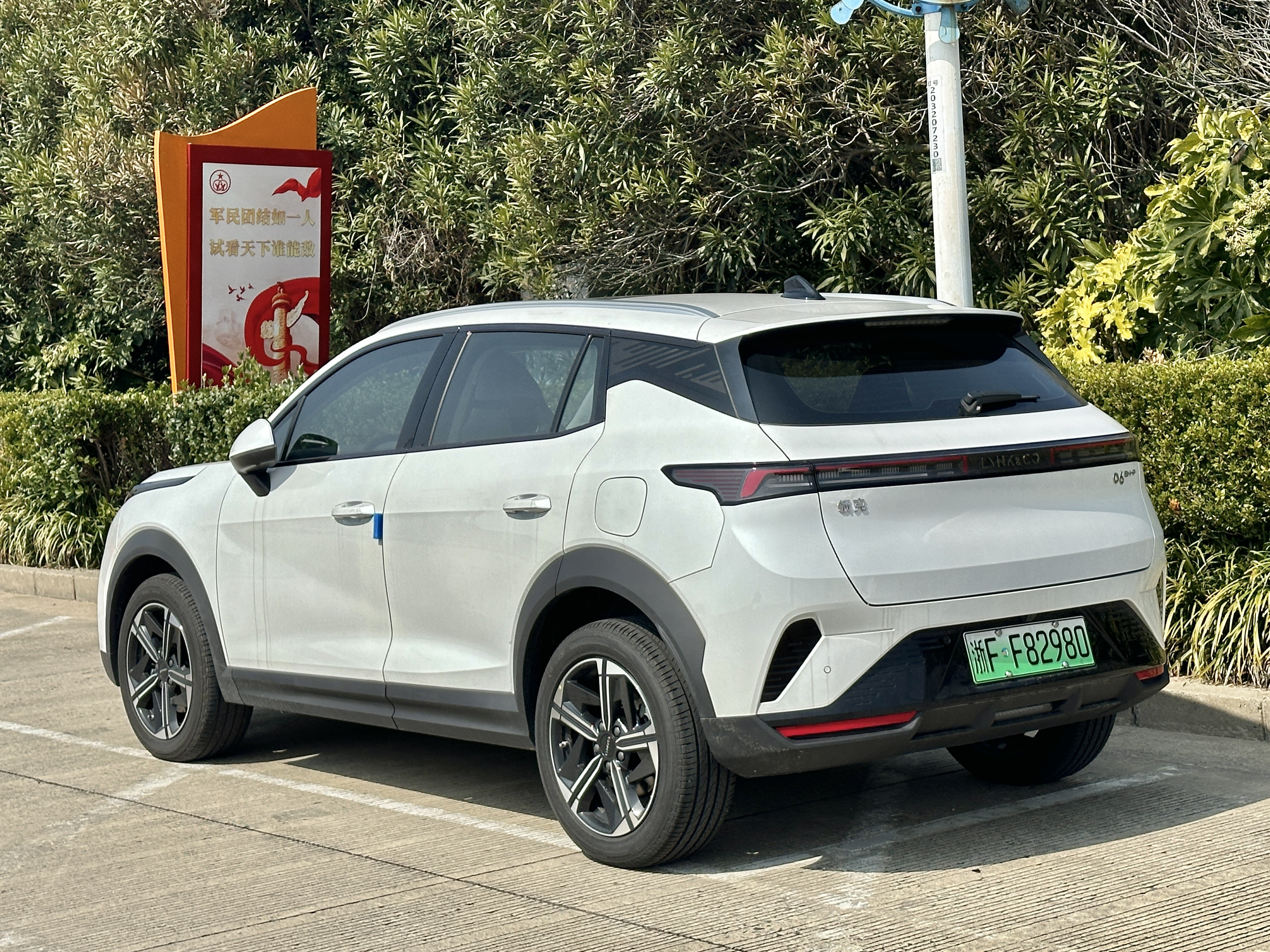
Rear view

== Sales ==
Year	China		
Year	06	PHEV	EM-P
2020	19,117	583	—
2021	47,837	5,768	—
2022	41,677	6,121	—
2023	60,734	2,783	6,709
2024	45,549	163	11,912
2025	38,823	—	2,825
