= Geely Icon =

Subcompact crossover SUV

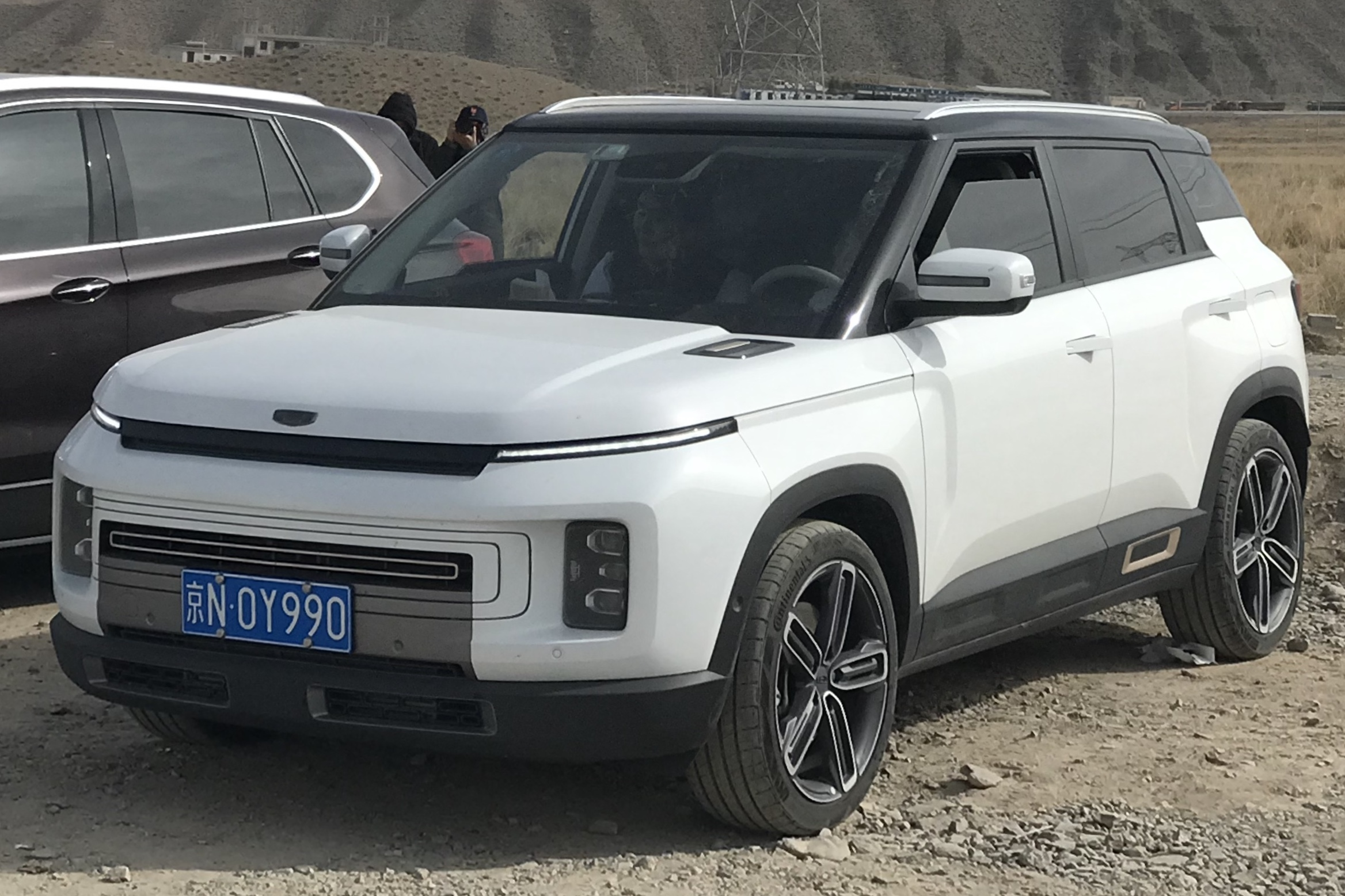

Overview
- Manufacturer: Geely Auto
- Model code: SX12
- Also called: Geely Cowboy (From 2024)
- Production: 2020–present
- Assembly: China: Qiantang, Hangzhou
- Designer: Guy Burgoyne (design chief); Rong Ma (exterior designer)

Body and chassis
- Class: Subcompact CUV
- Body style: 5-door crossover SUV
- Layout: Front engine, front-wheel-drive; Front engine, all-wheel-drive
- Platform: Geely BMA platform
- Related: Geely Binyue; Proton X50; Lynk & Co 06

Powertrain
- Engine: 1.5 L JLH-3G15TD I3 turbo
- Transmission: 7-speed DCT

Dimensions
- Wheelbase: 2,640 mm (103.9 in)
- Length: 4,350 mm (171.3 in)
- Width: 1,810 mm (71.3 in)
- Height: 1,615 mm (63.6 in)

The Geely Icon (stylised as ICON, Chinese: 吉利ICON) is a subcompact CUV produced by Chinese auto manufacturer Geely Auto. It was introduced on 24 February 2020.

== History ==
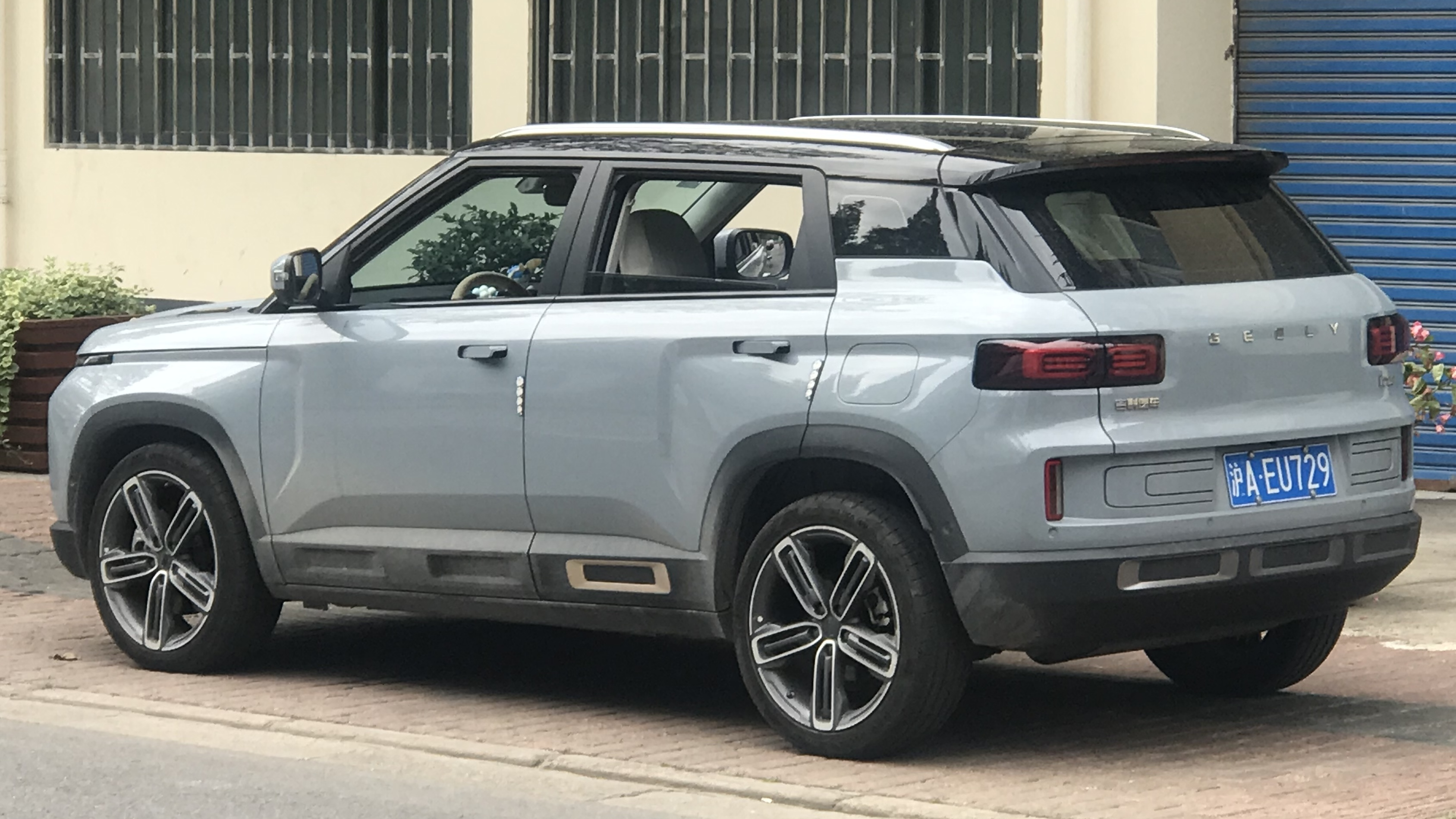
Geely Icon rear

The car was previewed as the ICON SUV Concept at the 2018 Beijing Auto Show. The car was designed in Geely Design's studio in Shanghai under the lead of the centre's design chief, Guy Burgoyne. The Icon was launched through an online streaming platform at the height of COVID-19 pandemic in China. As a response, the car was released with an 'Intelligent Air Purification System' that was claimed as N95 certified. The feature was claimed to work in tandem with the Icon's air conditioner to isolate and eliminate harmful elements in the cabin air including bacteria and viruses.

The car is equipped with level two driver-assist features enabled by 12 ultrasonic radars, millimetre wave radar, and five cameras. It features adaptive cruise control, lane-keep assistance, autonomous emergency braking and pedestrian recognition, one-button automatic parking, and a 360-degree camera. Geely Auto received over 30,000 orders in the hours leading up to its launch through online pre-order.

== Powertrain ==
The Geely Icon is powered by a 1.5-liter turbocharged engine that produces 175 hp (130 kW; 177 PS) and 255 N⋅m (188 lb⋅ft) of torque. A mild hybrid setup is available with a 48V electric system that ups the total output to 188 hp (140 kW; 191 PS) and 300 N⋅m (221 lb⋅ft). Fuel consumption for the mild hybrid setup is a claimed to be 17.5 km/L (5.7 L/100 km; 41 mpg_{‑US}). The sole transmission option available is a seven-speed dual-clutch transmission. The 0–100 km/h (0-62 mph) acceleration is in 7.9 seconds.

== Geely Cowboy ==
A variant called the Geely Cowboy was launched in 2024.

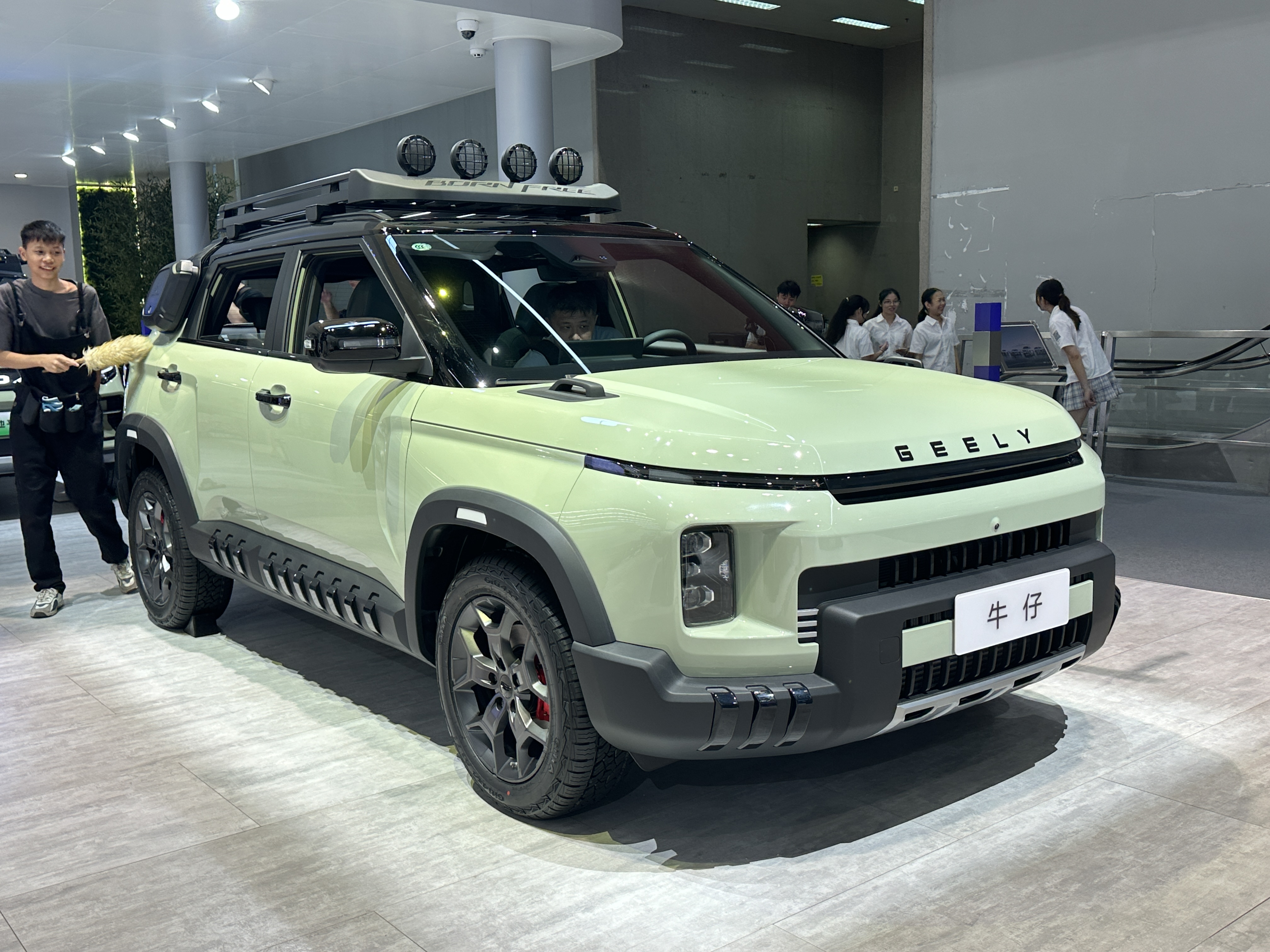
Geely Cowboy

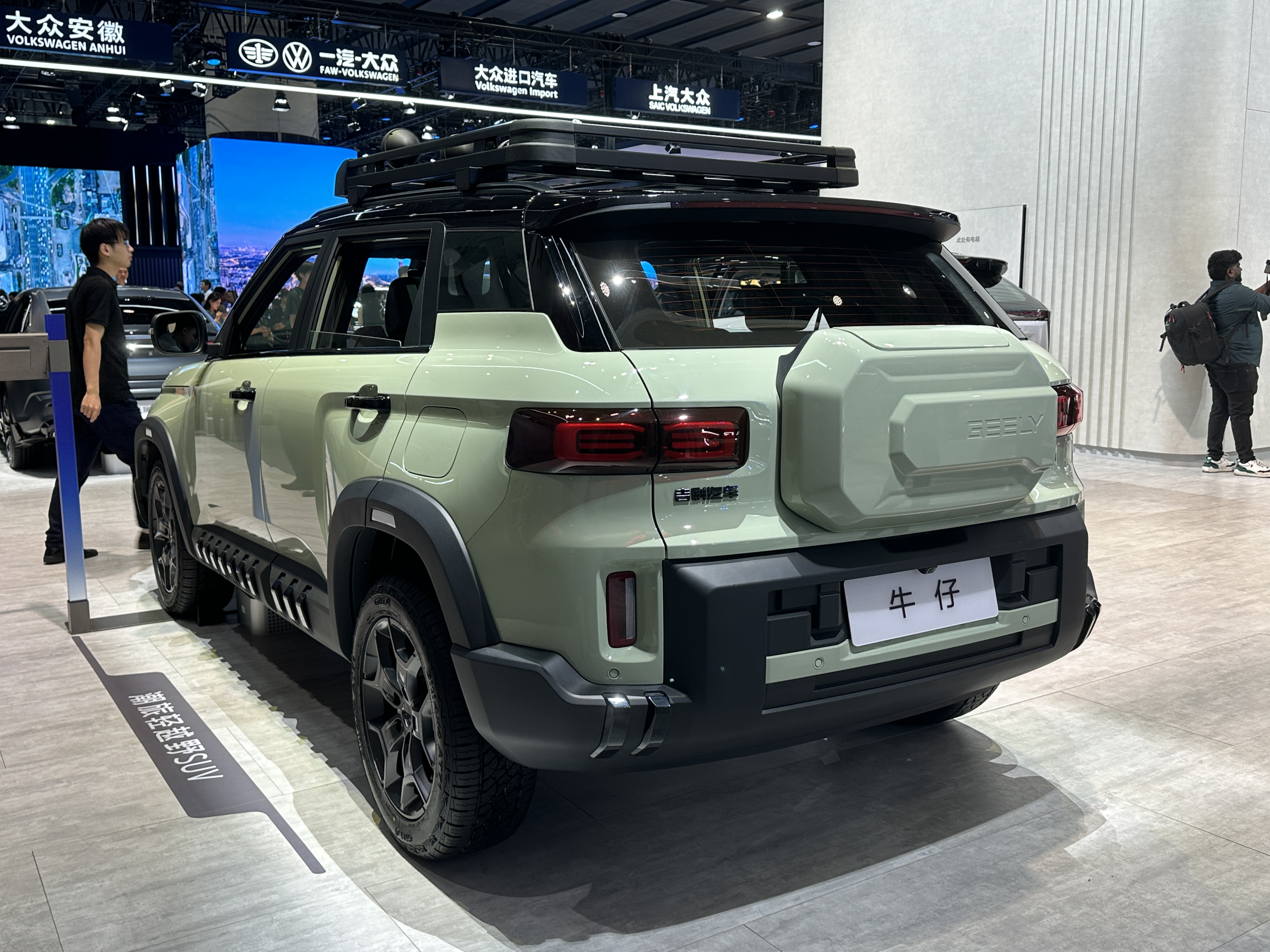
Rear view

== Sales ==
Year	China
2023	22,376
2024	14,258
2025	18,715
