= Proton X50 =

Malaysian subcompact crossover SUV

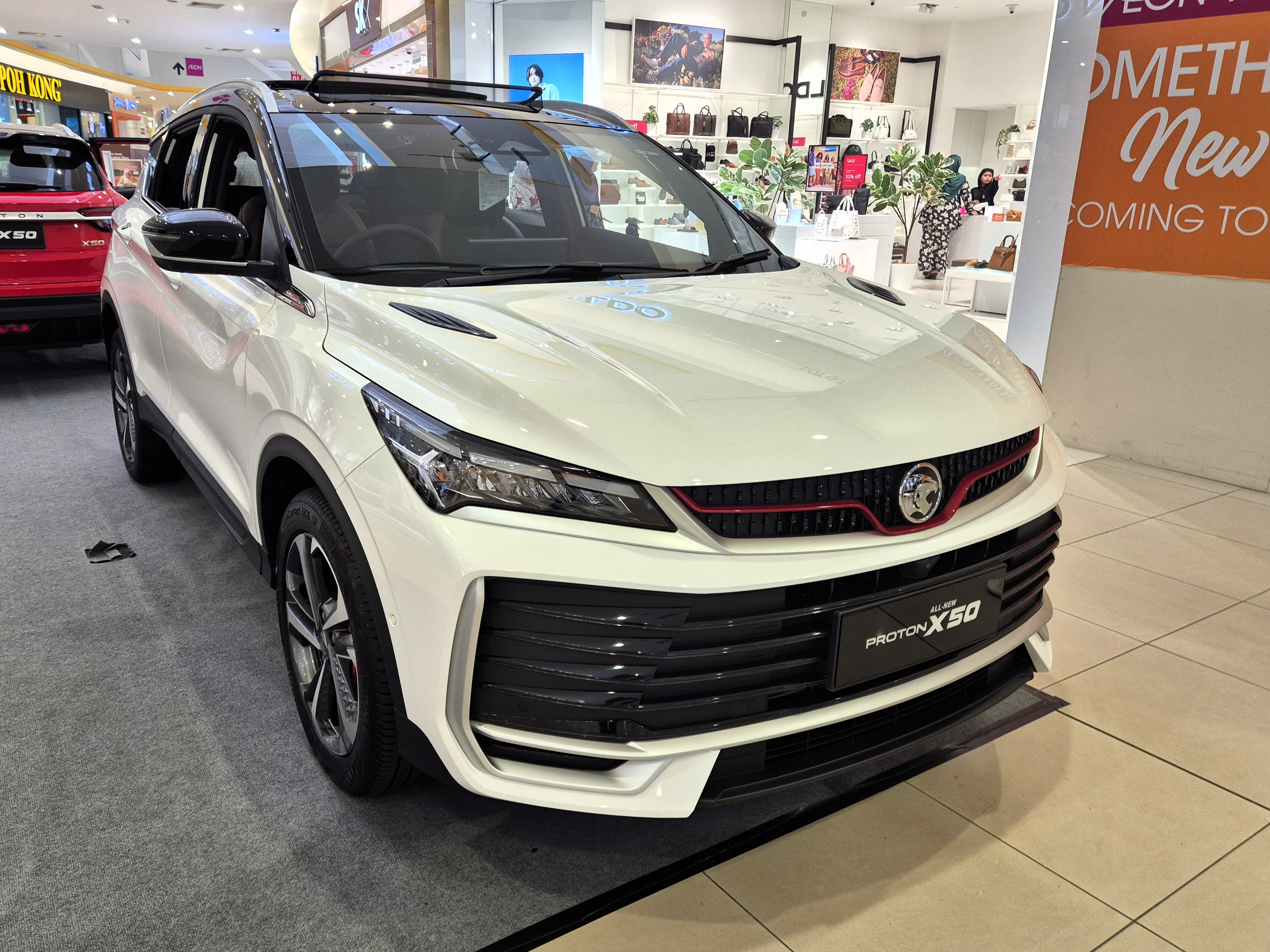

Overview
- Manufacturer: Proton
- Also called: Geely Binyue (China); Geely Coolray
- Production: September 2020 – present
- Assembly: Malaysia: Proton City, Tanjung Malim, Perak (PTMSB)
- Designer: Jamie Barrett

Body and chassis
- Class: Subcompact crossover SUV (B)
- Body style: 5-door SUV
- Layout: Front-engine, front-wheel-drive
- Platform: Geely BMA platform
- Related: Geely Icon; Lynk & Co 06

Powertrain
- Engine: Petrol: 1.5 L JLH-3G15T PFI I3 turbo; 1.5 L JLH-3G15TD T-GDI I3; 1.5 L BHE-15TD T I4
- Transmission: 7-speed DCT

Dimensions
- Wheelbase: 2,600 mm (102.4 in)
- Length: 4,330 mm (170.5 in)
- Width: 1,800 mm (70.9 in)
- Height: 1,609 mm (63.3 in)
- Curb weight: 1,325–1,370 kg (2,921.1–3,020.3 lb)

The Proton X50 is a subcompact crossover SUV produced by the Malaysian car maker Proton. Marketed as a B-segment SUV, the vehicle was revealed on 15 September 2020 and was launched on 27 October 2020. The model is the second SUV from the brand after the X70. The vehicle is a rebadged Geely Binyue with several changes, including the right-hand drive conversion and several mechanical adjustments.

== Overview ==
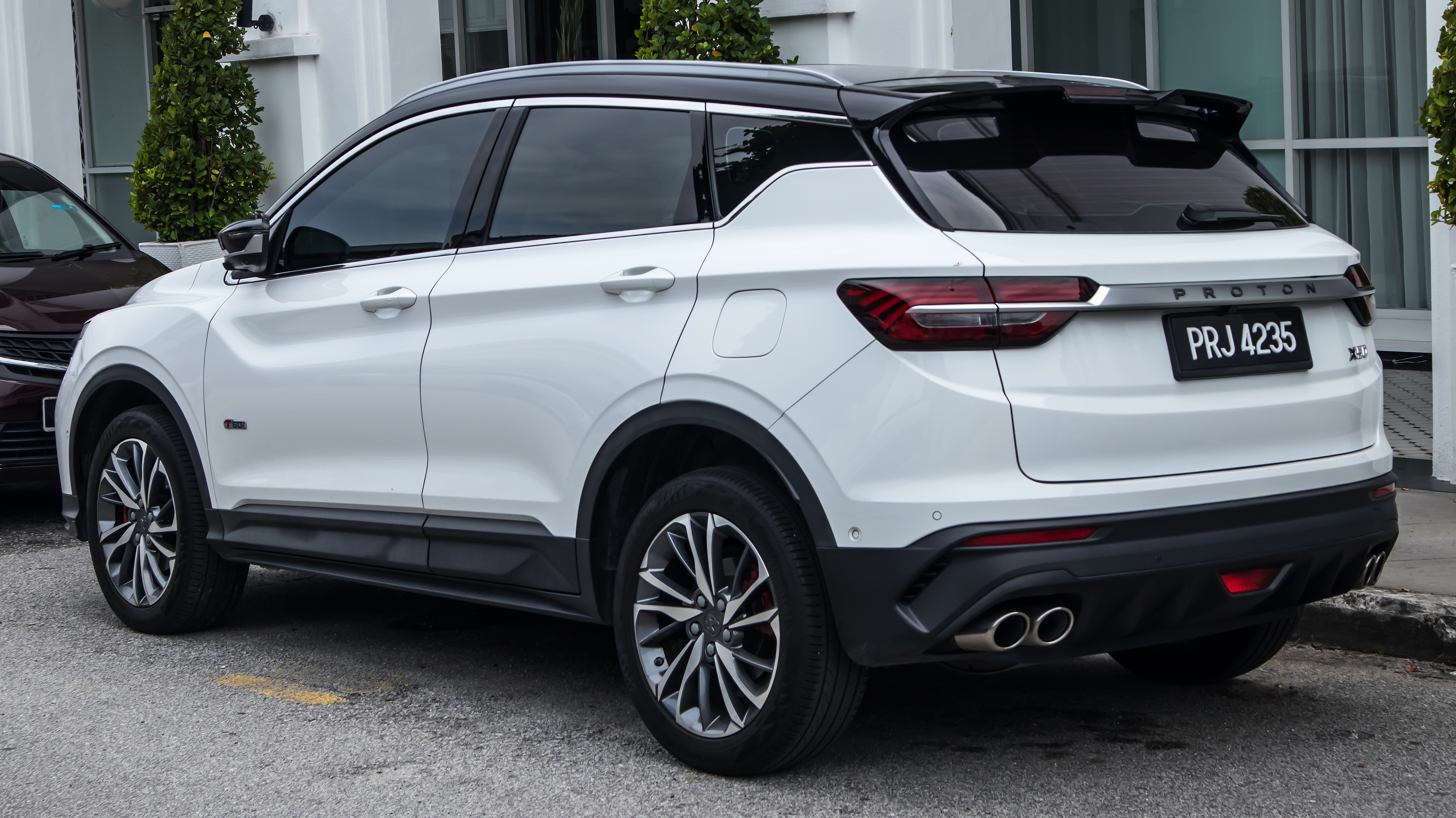
Rear, pre-facelift

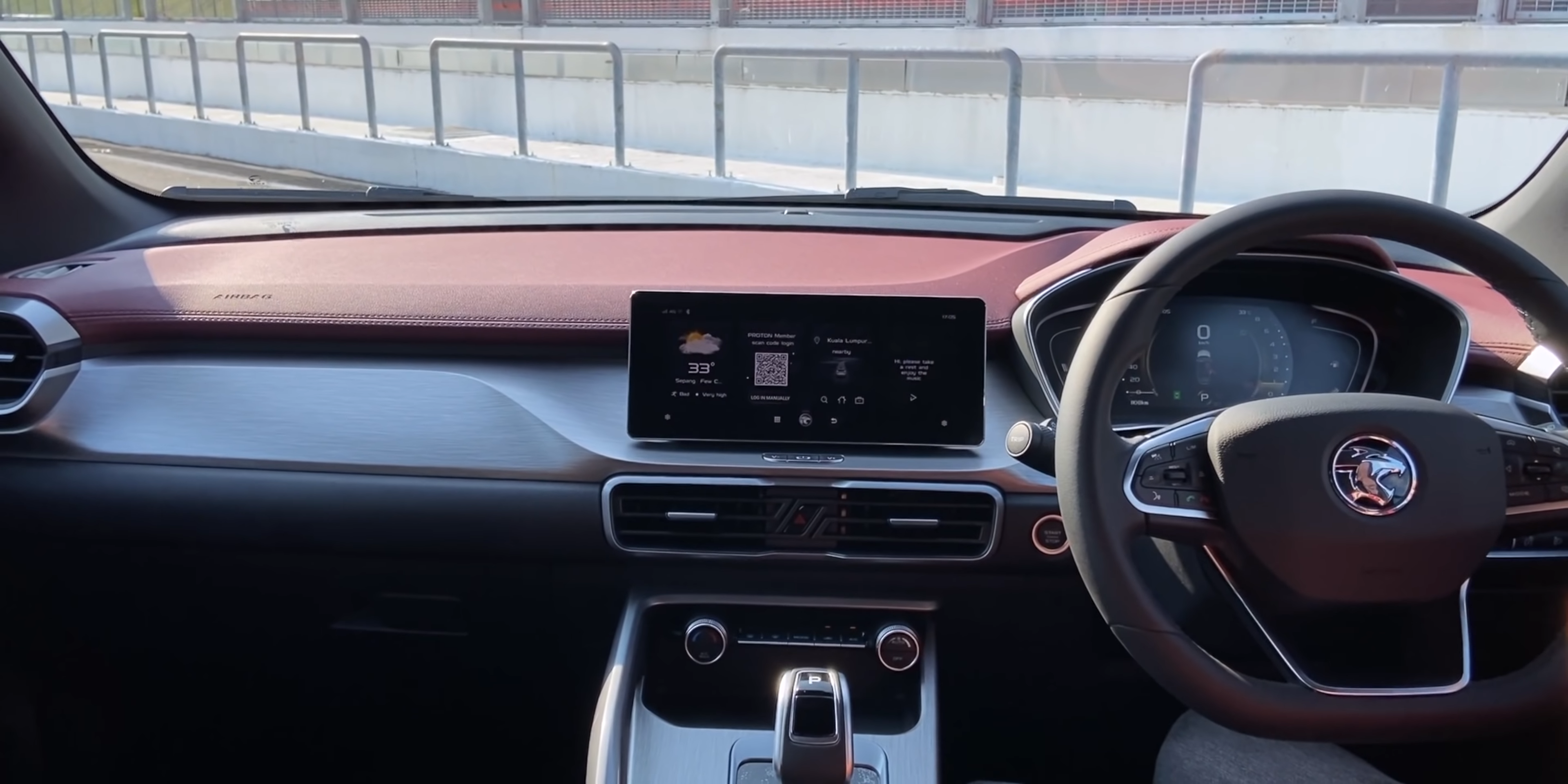
Interior, pre-facelift

Following the purchase of Proton by Geely in 2017, Proton has secured the intellectual properties to the design, development, manufacture, sale, marketing and distribution of the Geely Binyue alongside the Boyue (X70) and Jiaji. Camouflaged prototypes were seen being tested on public roads in Malaysia since February 2019.

As the Geely Binyue, the car is underpinned with the same BMA platform jointly developed by Geely and Volvo. The exterior design development of the Binyue was led by Jamie Barrett. Proton's head designer and Geely claimed that the design of the vehicle was inspired by a fighter jet.

As opposed to the X70 which was initially imported from China, the X50 is built in the Proton plant in Tanjung Malim from day one with a local content of 40 percent and contains 406 parts specific to the X50. The first unit rolled off the assembly line on 15 September 2020. At launch, the X50 was available in four grades: which are Standard, Executive, Premium, and Flagship.

In June 2024, the X50 RC (short for 'Running Change') debuted with changes includes increased number of standard features across the line-up, the touchscreen infotainment system features a faster processor and on-board Spotify, improved camera quality for the 360-degree camera system followed by customer feedback, improved NVH levels and its engine is locally assembled in the Proton plant instead of being imported from China. The exterior styling and engine specifications remain unchanged.

== Facelift (2025) ==
The facelifted X50 was launched in Malaysia on 24 July 2025. The facelift model is available with three trim levels: Executive, Premium, and Flagship. The base Standard trim is discontinued for the facelift model.

The design of the facelift model is based on the Geely Binyue L. The changes includes a redesigned front fascia with new LED reflector headlights and a new grille which reintroduced the red “Ethereal Bow” strip, the omission of front fog lights, a reshaped bonnet with the addition of faux air vents, new black plastic body cladding, new exterior colours, new alloy wheel designs, a redesigned rear fascia with a new full width LED taillight and the numberplate housing was moved lower on the boot door, and the Flagship trim received a black roof and new rear wing spoiler.

Inside, there is a new 8.8-inch digital instrument cluster, a new 14.6-inch touchscreen infotainment display with a new Malaysia voice control system named Aisyah and wireless connectivity for Android Auto and Apple CarPlay, a new 72-colour ambient lighting with a rhythmic mode, new inverted two-tone interior colour scheme for the Flagship trim designed to reduce reflections, the omission of physical controls for the exterior lighting and HVAC system, a redesigned centre console with new dual phone holders and a Qi wireless charger for the Flagship trim, and the relocation of the gear selector on the steering column stalk.

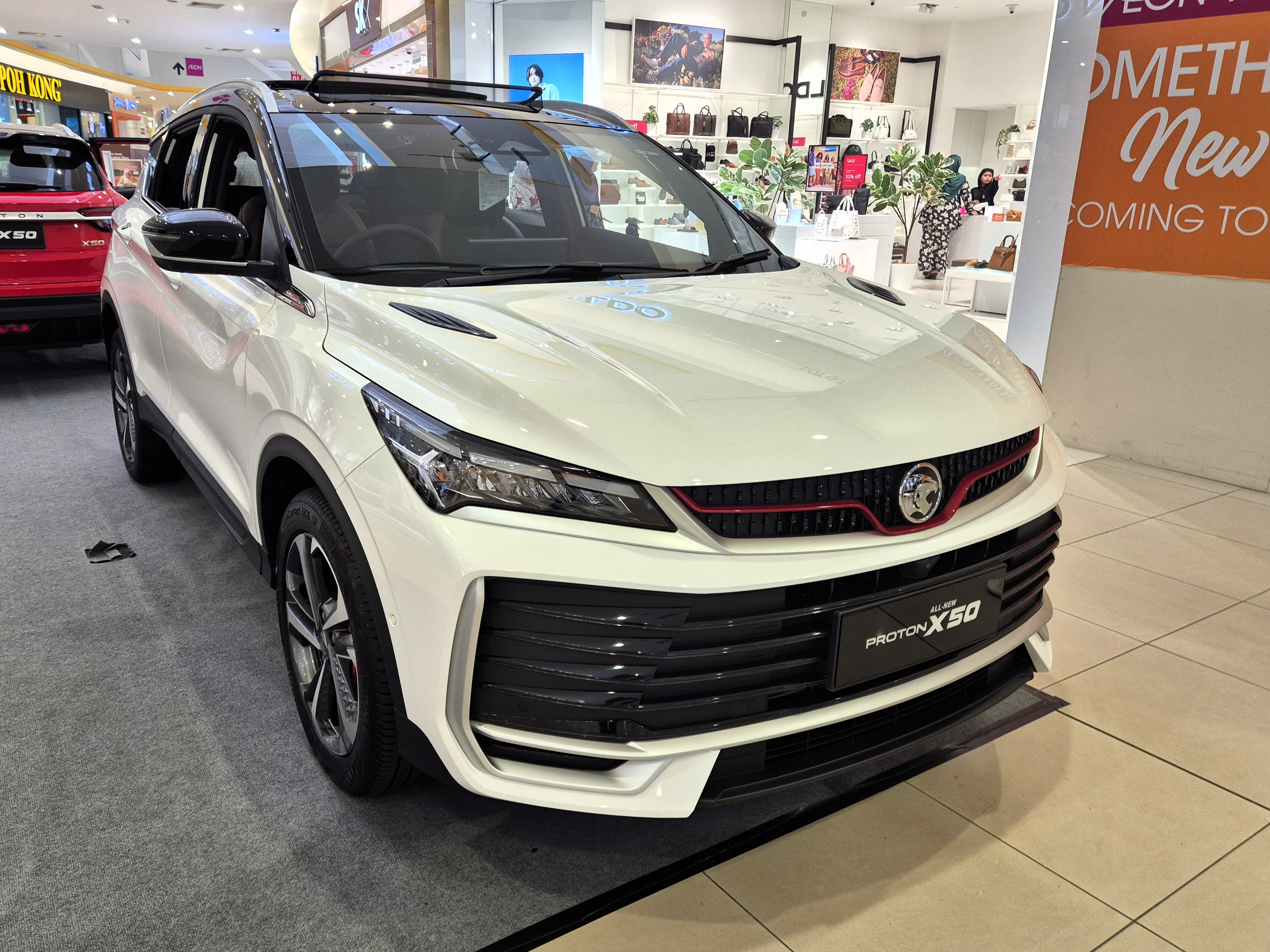
X50 Flagship, facelift

== Powertrain ==
The X50 is offered with two engine options in Malaysia, both are 1.5-litre three-cylinder unit with turbocharger coded JLH-3G15TD jointly co-developed by Geely and Volvo. The port-injection engine variant is available as standard, and the direct-injection engine for the Flagship variant.

The facelifted X50 is powered by the new 1.5-litre four-cylinder turbocharged petrol coded BHE15TD i-GT, developed by Aurobay, a joint venture (JV) company between Geely and Volvo. This engine is a 6 kW (8 hp; 8 PS) and 35 N⋅m (26 lb⋅ft) increase, compared to the previous three-cylinder unit used in the pre-facelift model.

Petrol engines
Model	Engine	Power	Torque	Transmissions
1.5T PFI	1,477 cc (90.1 cu in) I3 turbocharged	150 PS (110 kW; 148 hp) @ 5,500 rpm	226 N⋅m (23.0 kg⋅m; 167 lb⋅ft) @ 1,500–4,000 rpm	7-speed wet DCT
1.5 T-GDi	1,477 cc (90.1 cu in) I3 turbocharged	177 PS (130 kW; 175 hp) @ 5,500 rpm	255 N⋅m (26.0 kg⋅m; 188 lb⋅ft) @ 1,500–4,000 rpm	7-speed wet DCT
1.5TD	1,499 cc (91.5 cu in) I4 turbocharged	181 PS (133 kW; 179 hp) @ 5,500 rpm	290 N⋅m (29.6 kg⋅m; 214 lb⋅ft) @ 2,000–3,500 rpm	7-speed wet DCT

== Safety ==
The X50 is equipped with four airbags, vehicle stability control, hill start assist, hill descent control and rear ISOFIX child seat anchors as standard. Upper trims would receive six airbags and a tire pressure monitoring system, while the Flagship trim gained the Advanced Driving Assistance System (ADAS) safety suite which includes adaptive cruise control with stop and go function, lane centring assist, autonomous emergency braking with pedestrian detection, lane keeping assist, blind spot monitoring and automatic high beam.

The facelifted X50 received an upgraded Advanced Driving Assistance System (ADAS) safety suite with improved functionality for Level 2 semi-autonomous driving features. All trim levels of the facelift model became standard with Rear Side Radar System (RSRS) and six airbags. The Auto Park Assist system for the Flagship trim also been upgraded which is able to support both parallel and perpendicular parking.

=== ASEAN NCAP ===
ASEAN NCAP test results Proton X50 (2020)
Test	Points
Overall:	5 /5 stars
Adult occupant:	43.64
Child occupant:	21.17
Safety assist:	19.44

== Export ==
=== Mauritius ===
The X50 is sold in Mauritius since February 2022, after an announcement was made in November 2021 with pre-orders in December 2021.

=== Mozambique ===
The X50 is sold in Mozambique since May 2023, with four variants also available.

=== South Africa ===
On 31 May 2022, Proton has shipped some X50 units to South Africa alongside the Proton X70 and Proton Saga.

=== Trinidad & Tobago ===
The X50 was launched in Trinidad & Tobago on 13 March 2024.

=== Vietnam ===
Proton reported that 200 X50s were exported to Vietnam.

== Sales ==
Year	Malaysia	Brunei
2020	3,726	
2021	28,462	
2022	39,556	
2023	30,981	476
2024	22,674	
2025	26,310	
