= Geometry A =

Battery-powered compact sedan produced by Chinese auto brand Geometry

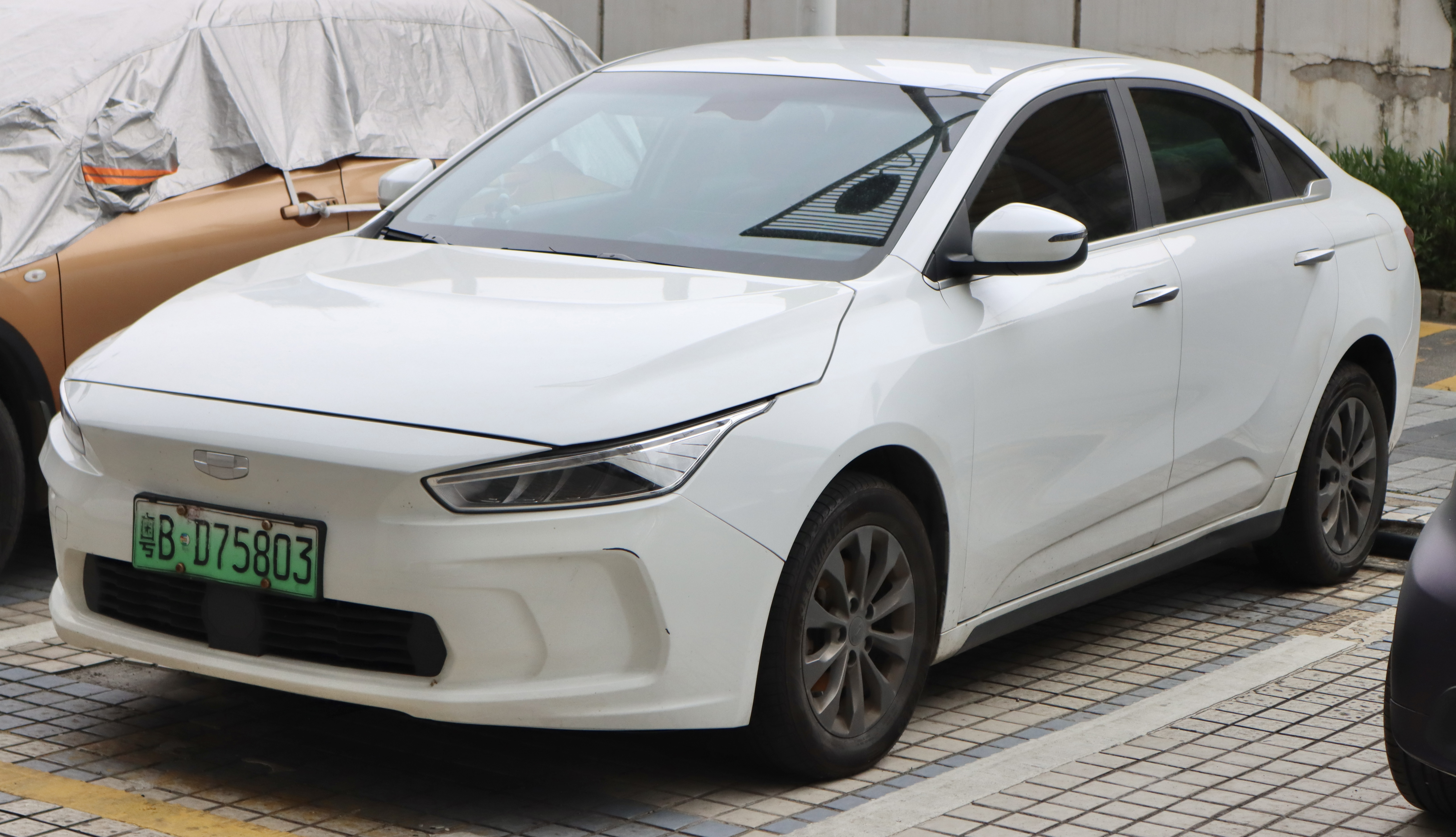
- Geely Geometry A

Overview
- Manufacturer: Geely
- Model code: GE11
- Also called: Geometry G6
- Production: 2019–present
- Designer: Xi Su

Body and chassis
- Class: Compact car (C)
- Body style: 4-door sedan
- Layout: Front-engine, front-wheel-drive
- Related: Geometry C Geely Emgrand L Geely Emgrand S

Powertrain
- Electric motor: 120 kW, 250 Nm Permanent Magnet Synchronous Reluctance Motor
- Transmission: 1-speed fixed gear
- Battery: 51.9 kWh (187 MJ) Lithium ion 61.9 kWh (223 MJ) Lithium ion
- Electric range: 410 kilometres (255 mi) Standard (NEDC); 500 kilometres (311 mi) Long Range (NEDC)

Dimensions
- Wheelbase: 2,700 mm (106.3 in)
- Length: 4,736 mm (186.5 in)
- Width: 1,804 mm (71.0 in)
- Height: 1,503 mm (59.2 in)

The Geometry A is a battery-powered compact sedan produced by Chinese auto manufacturer Geely under the Geely Geometry brand. It was unveiled at the 2019 Shanghai Auto Show.

== Overview ==
The Geometry A is the first model of the Geometry brand. It was developed based on the Geely Emgrand GL sedan. The A has a very low drag coefficient of Cd=0.237.

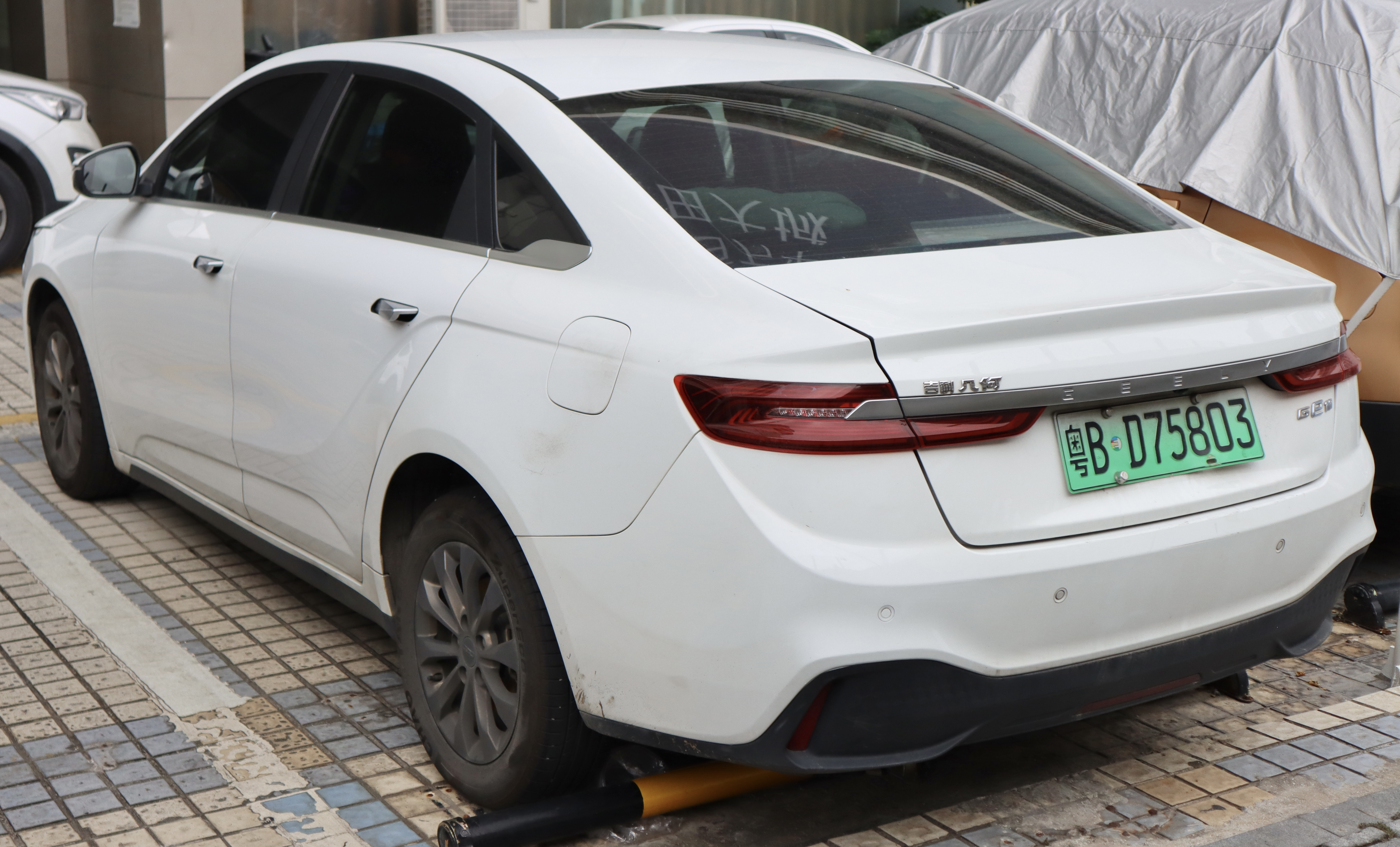
Rear view

=== Powertrain ===
The Geometry A comes in a choice of two battery capacities, a 51.9 kWh and a longer-range 61.9 kWh version with a range of 500 km (310 miles) on a single charge. The A powertrain provides a maximum power of 120 kW (163 PS; 161 bhp) and torque of 250 N⋅m (184 lb⋅ft), with acceleration to 100 km/h (62 mph) in 8.8 seconds.

=== Geometry A Pro ===
As of February 2021, teasers of the facelift of the Geometry A was revealed. The post facelift model is called the Geometry A Pro, and the updated model features an electric motor producing 150 kW (200 PS; 200 hp) and 310 N⋅m (229 lb⋅ft) of torque. The battery density of the Geometry A Pro is 183.23Wh/kg and the NEDC range is 600 km (373 mi)

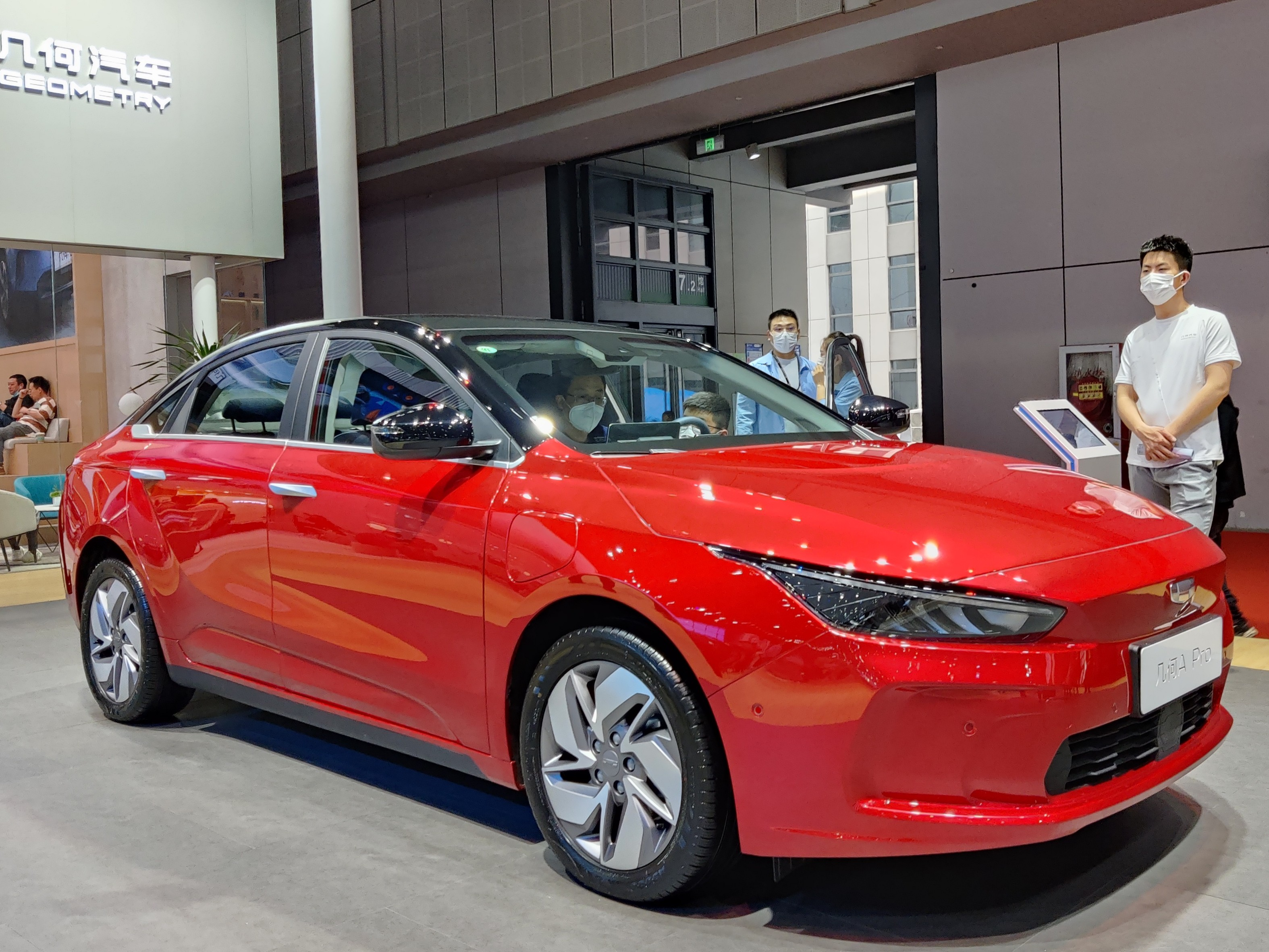
Geometry A Pro

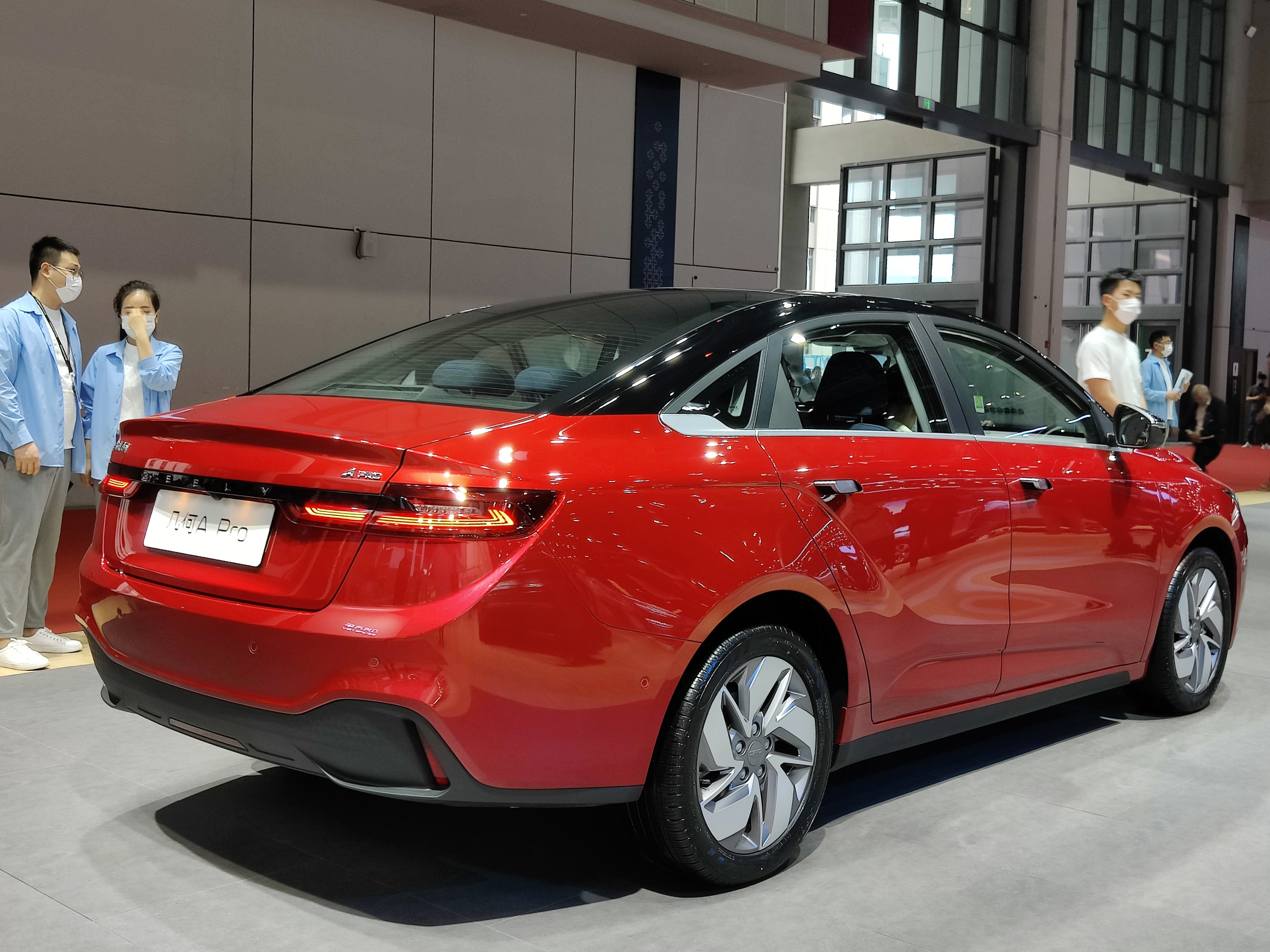
Rear view

=== Geometry G6 ===
The Geometry G6 is the facelifted variant of the Geometry A launched in September 2022. The G6 features restyled front and rear end designs as well as the Harmony OS operating system by Huawei. The power comes from a 150 kW electric motor with two variants offering a 480 km and 620 km electric range respectively.

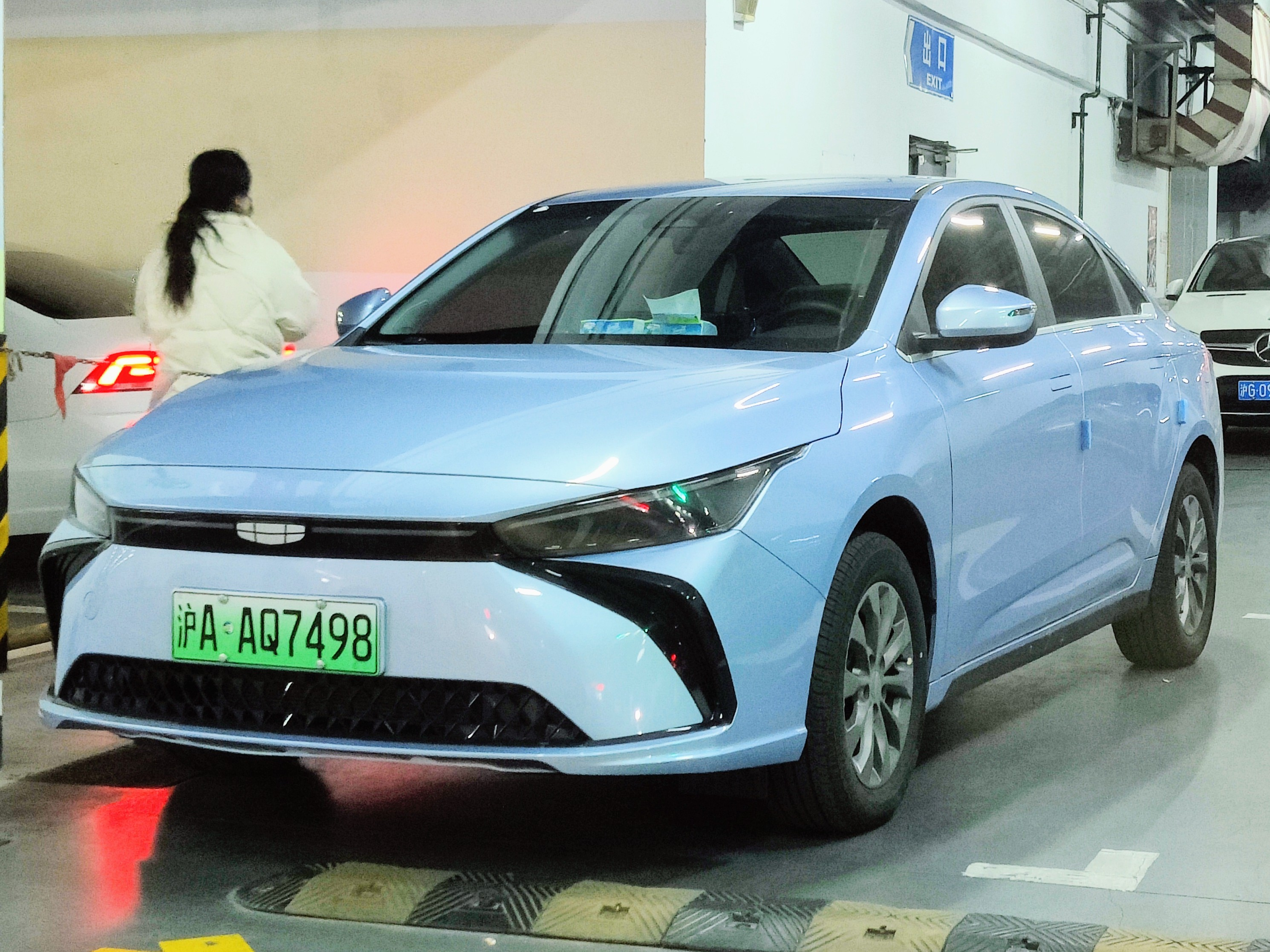
Geometry G6

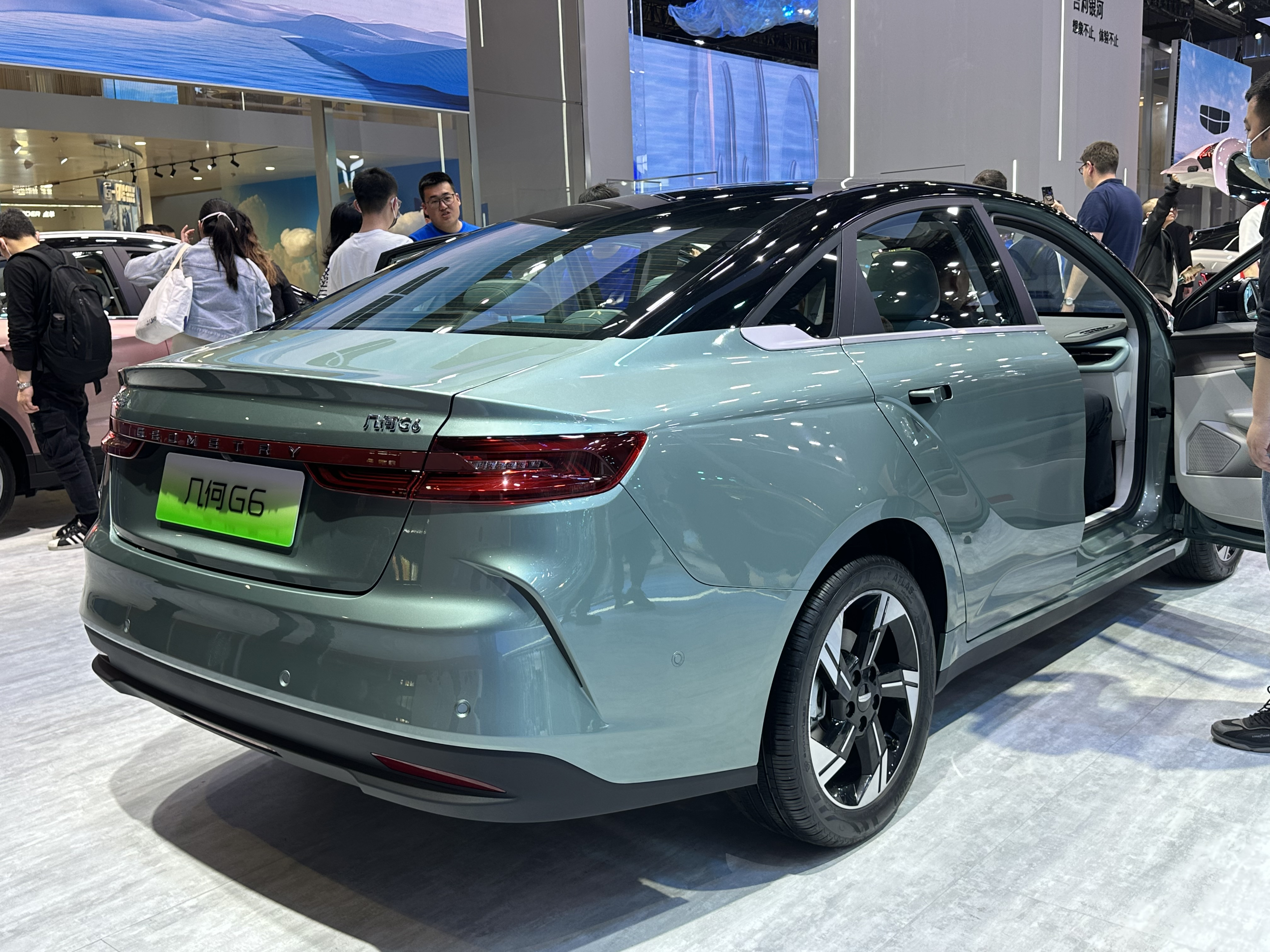
Rear view

== Sales ==
| Year | China | |
| Year | A | G6 |
|---|---|---|
| 2020 | 5,051 | — |
| 2021 | 14,986 | — |
| 2022 | 53,361 | 3,140 |
| 2023 | 18,481 | 6,021 |
| 2024 | 17,484 | 3,072 |
| 2025 | 12,027 | |
