= Geely Geometry =

Chinese electric automobile brand

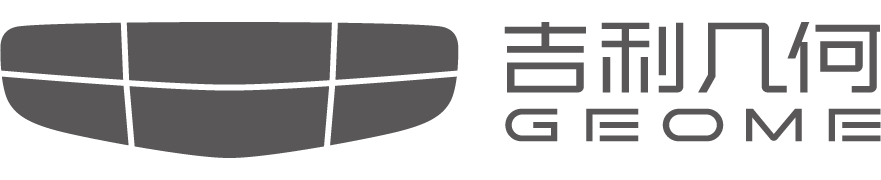
- Product type: Automotive sub-brand
- Current owner: Geely Auto
- Country: China
- Introduced: 2019
- Discontinued: Merged to Geely Galaxy in 2024
- Markets: China
- Website: geometryauto.com

Geely Geometry (Chinese: 吉利几何; pinyin: Jílì jǐhé), or simply known as Geometry or Geome, is a car brand created by the Chinese car company Geely in April 2019. The Geely Geometry brand is mainly focused on the development of electric vehicles.

The Geometry brand has been reconsolidated into Geely Auto as an entry-level electric product series in March 2023. In October 2024, the brand was reorganized again, and would be incorporated as a "smart boutique small car series" (as Geome) under Geely Galaxy brand and dealership network.

== History ==
Logo of Geometry used during Is foundation

In 2019, Geely created new Geely Geometry subsidiary intended to offer affordable electric cars. At the Beijing Auto Show in April 2019, the brand's first vehicle, the Geometry A compact sedan was presented. In June 2020, Geometry presented its second vehicle called the Geometry C, a compact hatchback. In February 2021, Geometry presented Geometry A Pro, equipped with a new generation electric motor, with over 203 horsepower and can travel a maximum of 600 kilometers on one charge under the NEDC cycle.

In November 2022, Geely announced that Geometry would begin sales in Hungary, the Czech Republic and Slovakia.

In March 2023, the Geometry brand was reconsolidated into Geely Auto as an entry-level electric product series. Geometry is primarily designed for the Chinese market and announced an ambition to produce more than 10 different electric cars by 2025.

In September 2024, Geely Holding Group released the "Taizhou Declaration", which clearly stated that it would further clarify the positioning of each brand, reduce conflicts of interest and duplicate investments, and improve the group's operational efficiency. The next month, at the launch conference of the Geely Xingyuan, Geely Auto Group CEO Gan Jiayue announced that Geely Geometry was officially incorporated into the Geely Galaxy brand. Geome became a "smart boutique small car series" in the Geely Galaxy series.

== Products ==
In October 2024, Geely announced to merge all the current Geometry models into Galaxy dealership network as "Network B", the previous Geely Galaxy dealerships became "Network A".

- Geometry A/G6 (2019–present), compact sedan, BEV variant of Geely Emgrand L
- Geometry C (2020–2024), compact SUV, BEV variant of Geely Emgrand S
- Geometry E (2022–present), subcompact SUV, BEV
- Geometry EX3 (2021–2022), subcompact SUV, BEV
- Geometry M6 (2022–present), compact SUV, BEV variant of Geely Emgrand S
- Geometry Panda/M2 (2022–present), city car, BEV
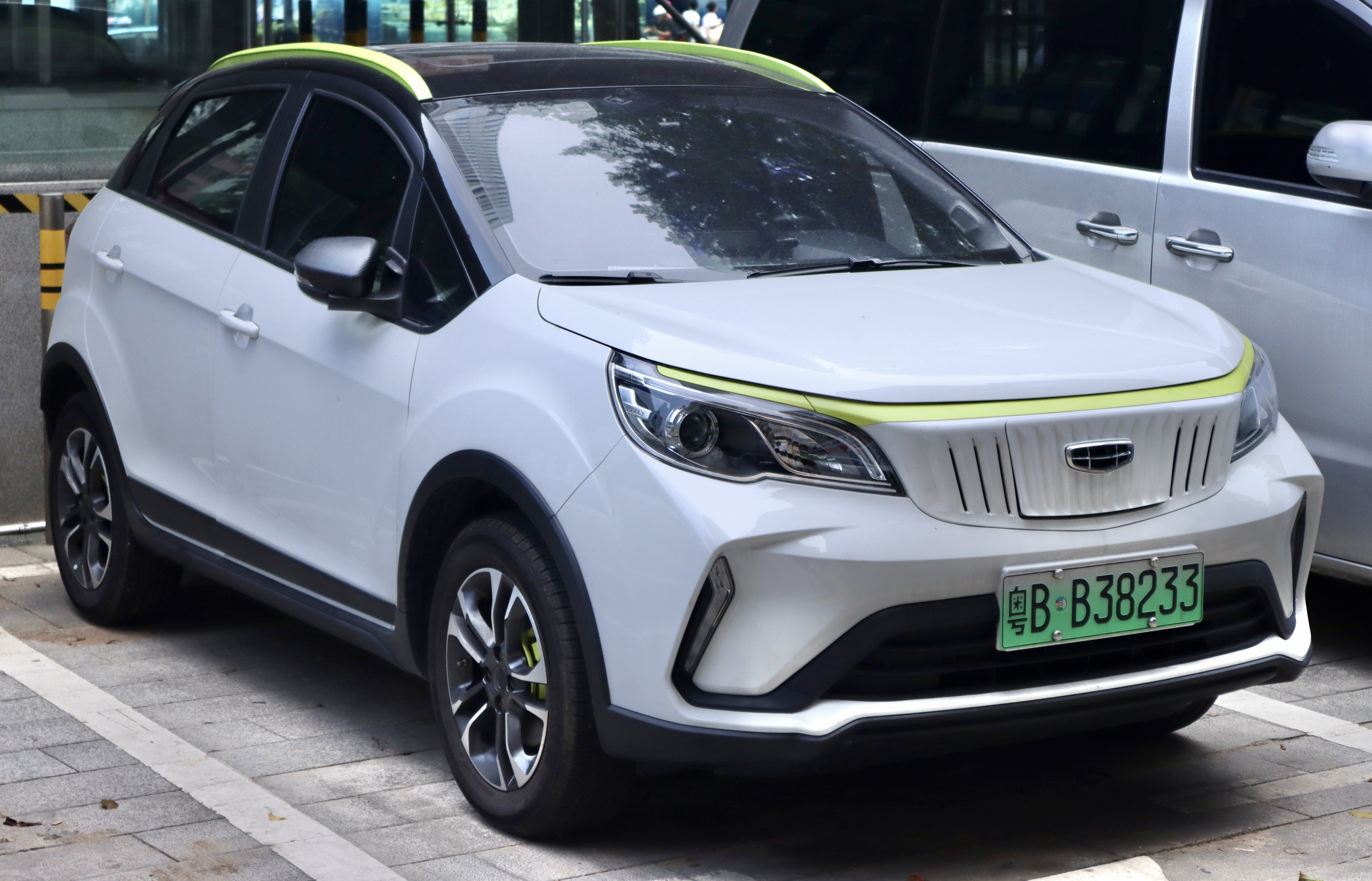
Geometry EX3

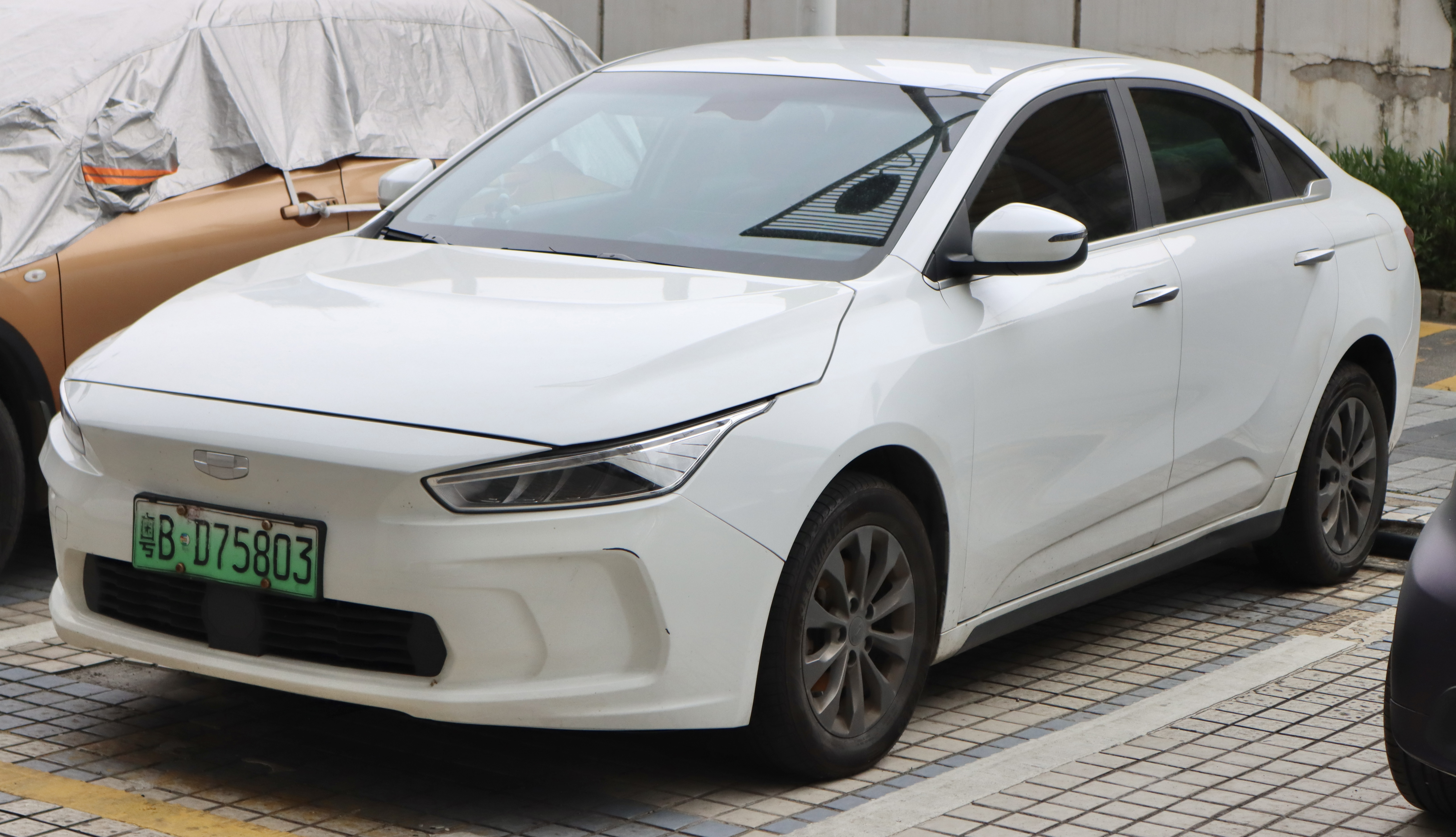
Geometry A

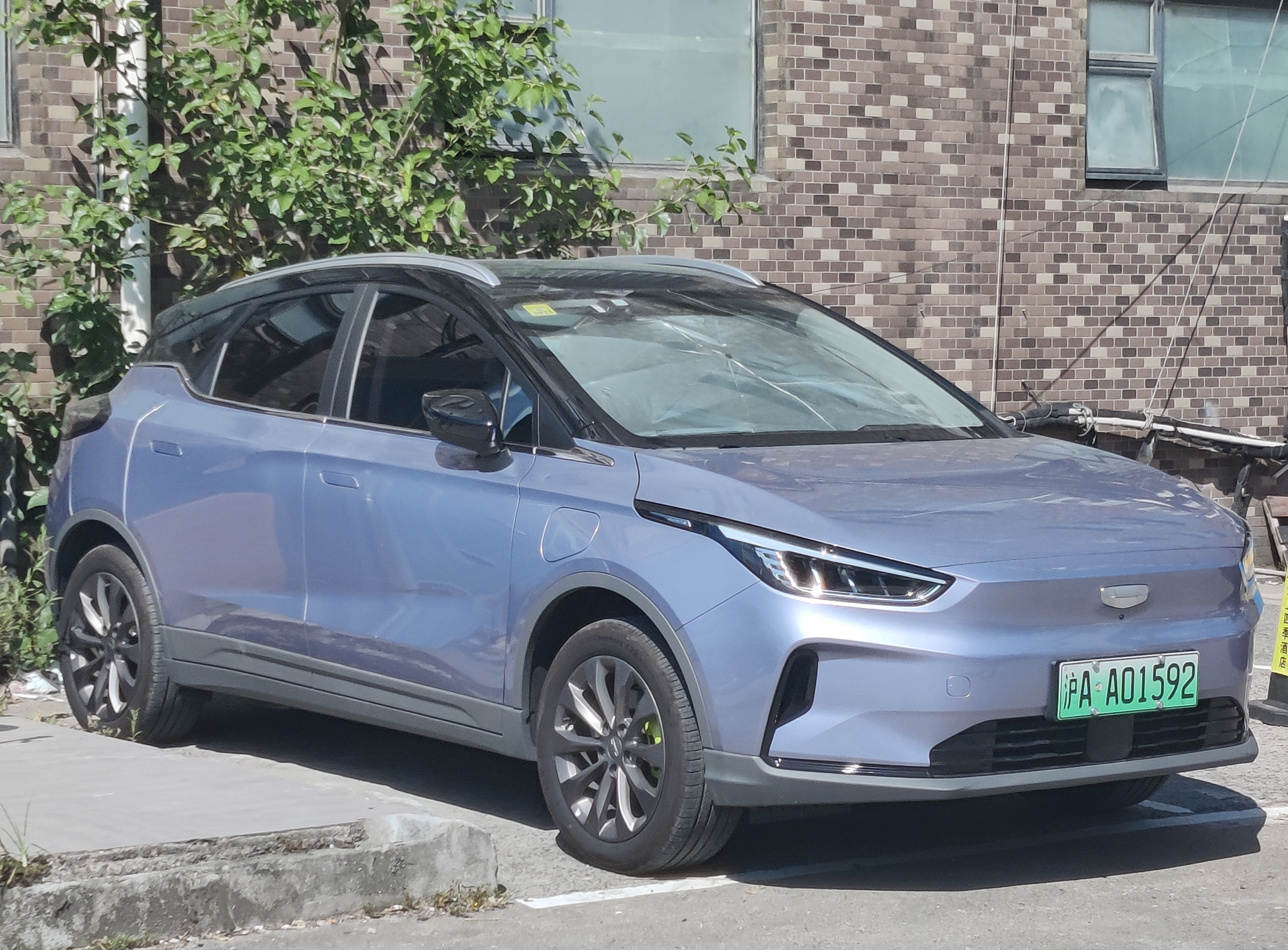
Geometry C

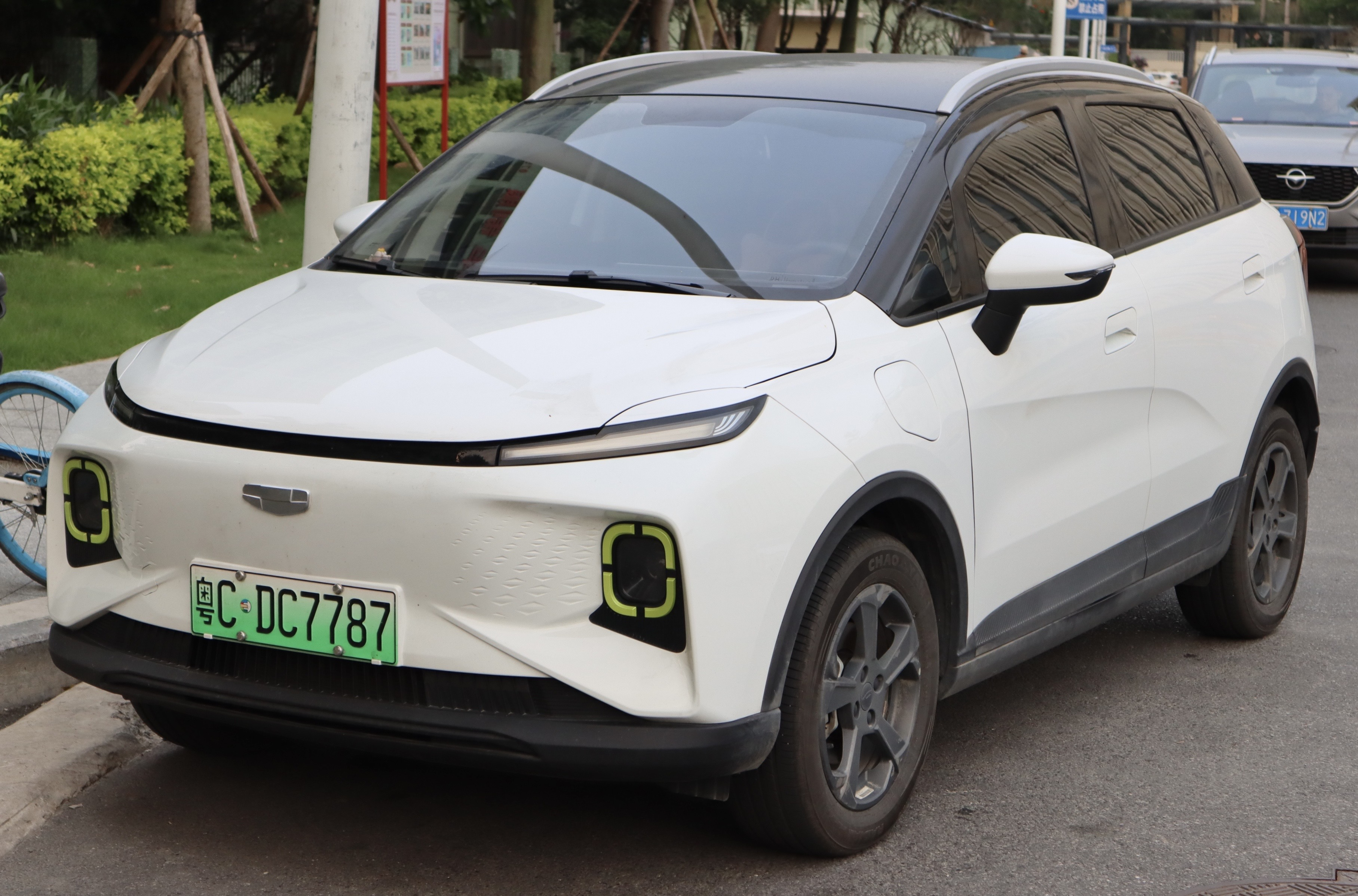
Geometry E

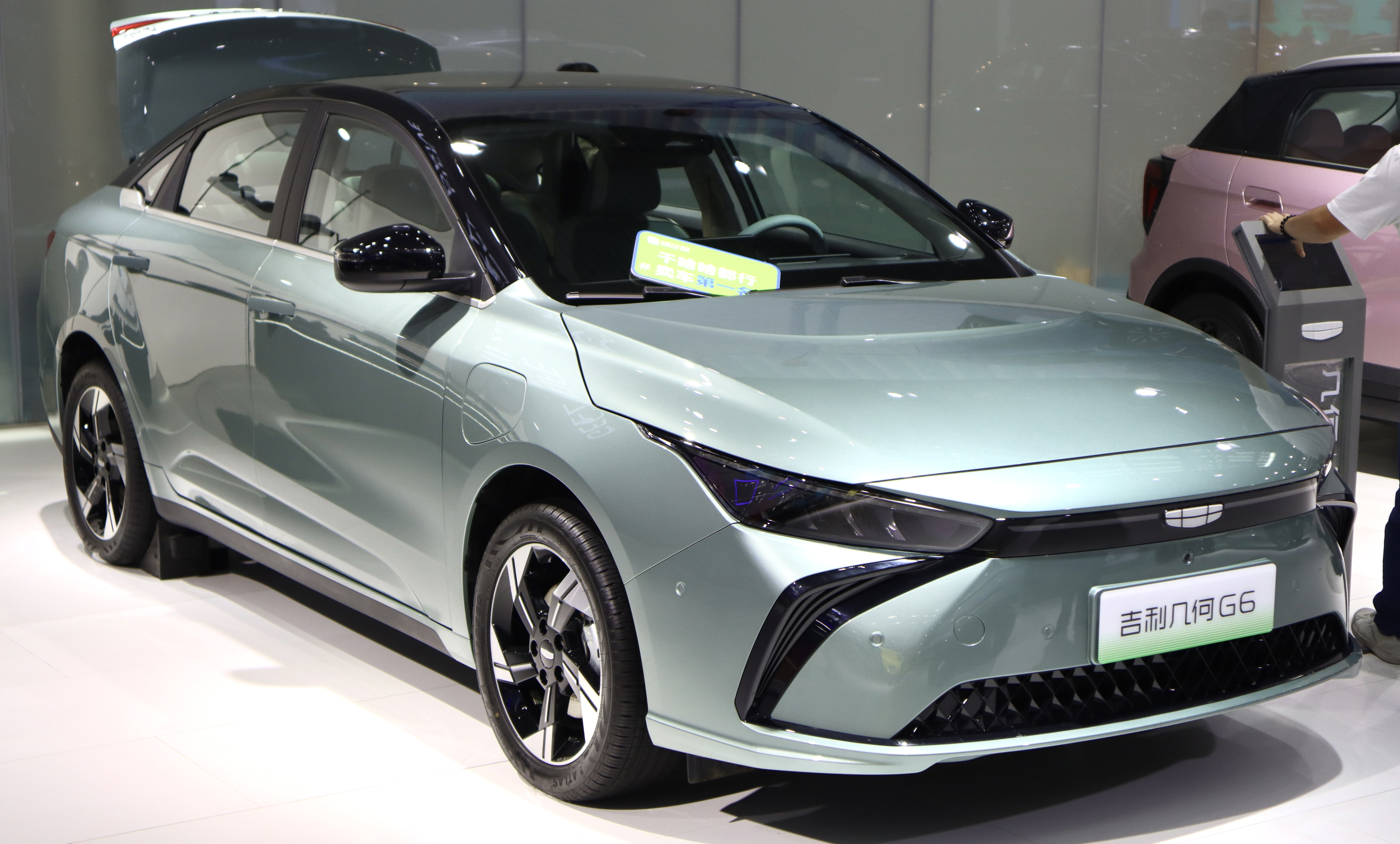
Geometry G6

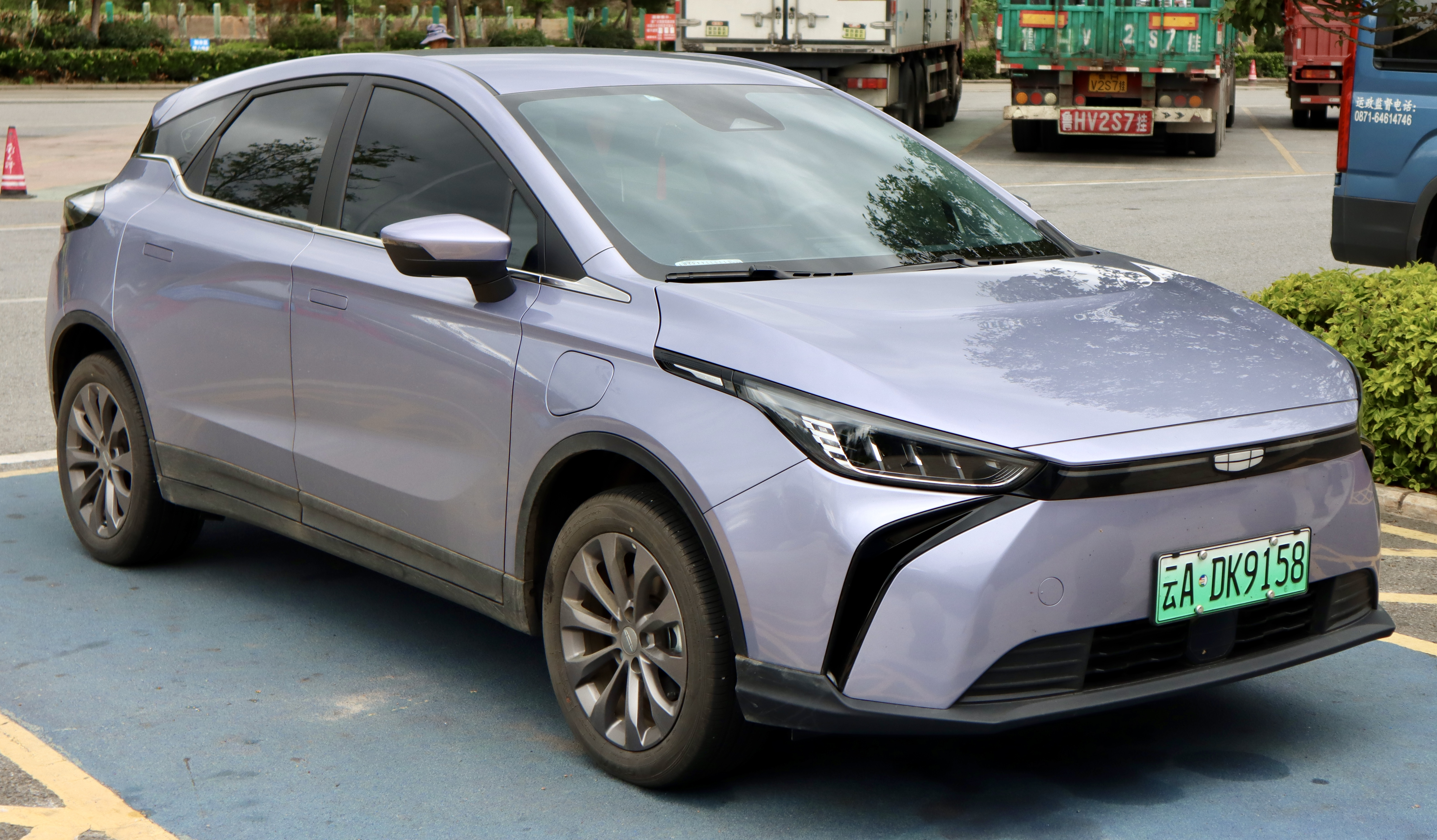
Geometry M6

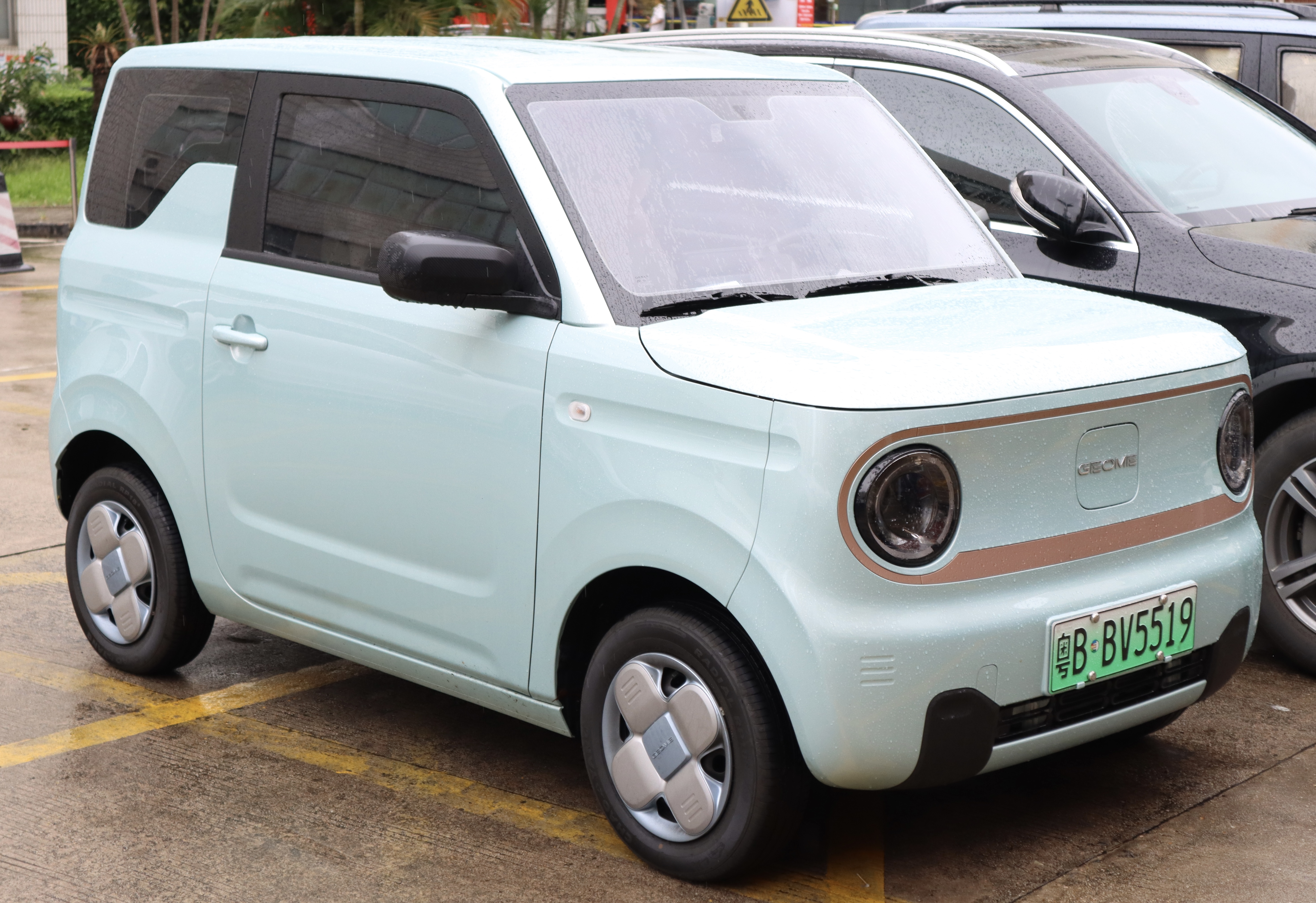
Geometry Panda
