= Geometry C =

Battery-powered mid-size sedan produced by Chinese auto brand Geometry

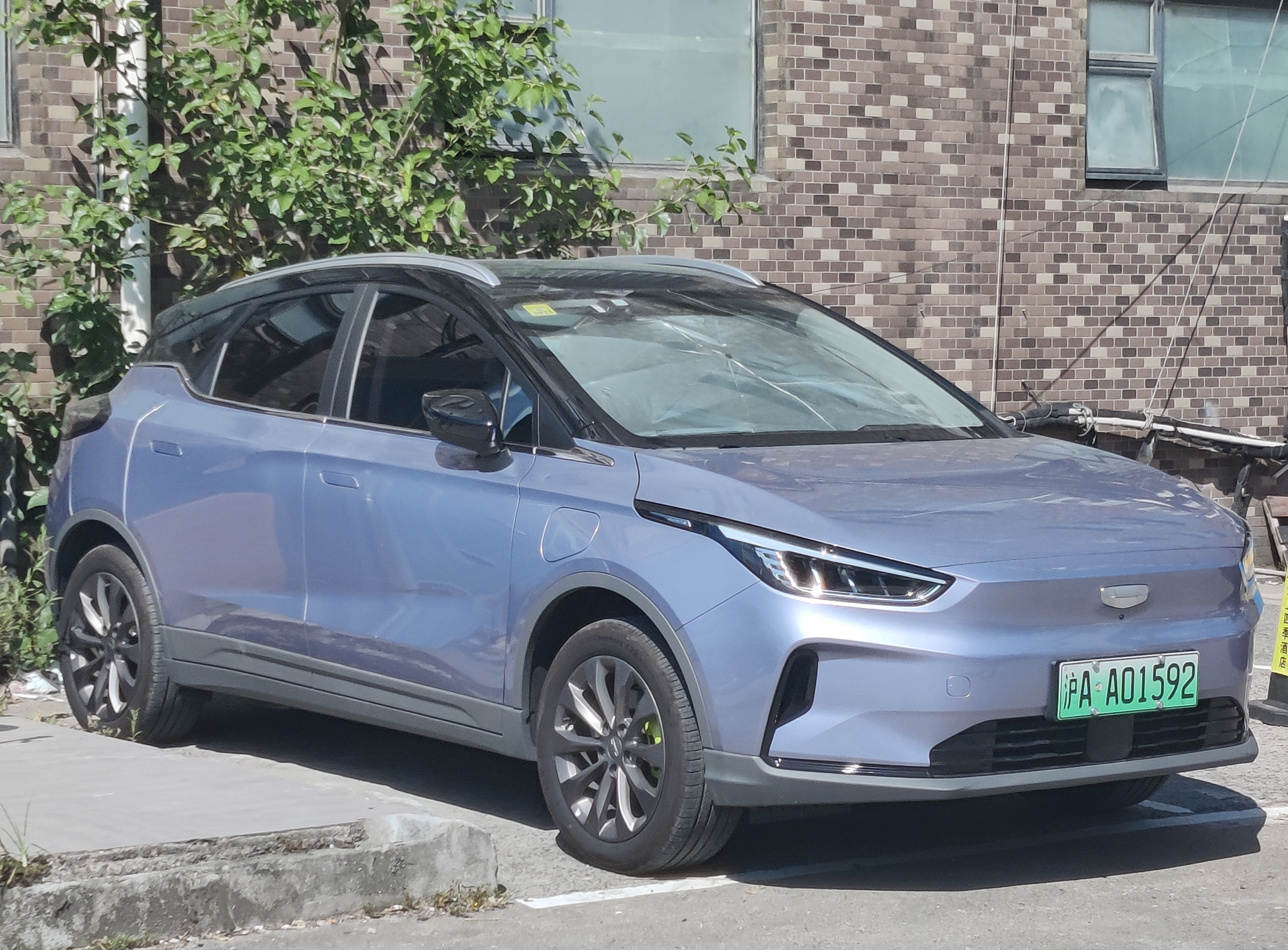
- Geely Geometry C

Overview
- Manufacturer: Geely Auto
- Also called: Geometry M6
- Production: 2020–2024 (C); 2022–present (M6)
- Designer: Yiyuan Wang

Body and chassis
- Class: Compact crossover SUV (C)
- Body style: 5-door SUV
- Layout: Front-engine, front-wheel-drive
- Related: Geometry A; Geely Emgrand L; Geely Emgrand S

Powertrain
- Electric motor: 150 kW Ni150Ex permanent magnet synchronous
- Transmission: 1-speed fixed gear
- Battery: 53 kWh NMC CATL; 70 kWh NMC CATL
- Electric range: 400–550 km (249–342 mi) (NEDC); 450–580 km (280–360 mi) (CLTC)

Dimensions
- Wheelbase: 2,700 mm (106.3 in)
- Length: 4,432 mm (174.5 in)
- Width: 1,833 mm (72.2 in)
- Height: 1,560 mm (61.4 in)

The Geometry C is a battery electric compact crossover SUV produced by Chinese manufacturer Geely Auto under the Geometry brand.

== Overview ==
The Geometry C is the second model of the Geometry brand. It was developed based on the Geely Emgrand GS, and comes in a choice of two battery capacities, a 53 kWh and a longer-range 70 kWh providing a NEDC range of 400 and 500 km (249 and 311 mi) respectively, with the cells in both batteries coming from CATL. The electric motors were produced by Nidec and can produce up to 150 kW. The motors are called the Ni150Ex and will cover a power range from 50 kW to 200 kW. Geometry C has 200 hp (149 kW; 203 PS) motor with 310 N⋅m (229 lb⋅ft) of torque that drives the front wheels and has a top speed of 150 km/h (93 mph).

The Geometry C became Israel's top-selling vehicle in August 2022, marking the first time that an electric car held the top spot in total vehicle sales in the Israeli market.

On February 9, 2023, Geely Geometry C was introduced to the African market for the first time, and launched in the Egyptian market.

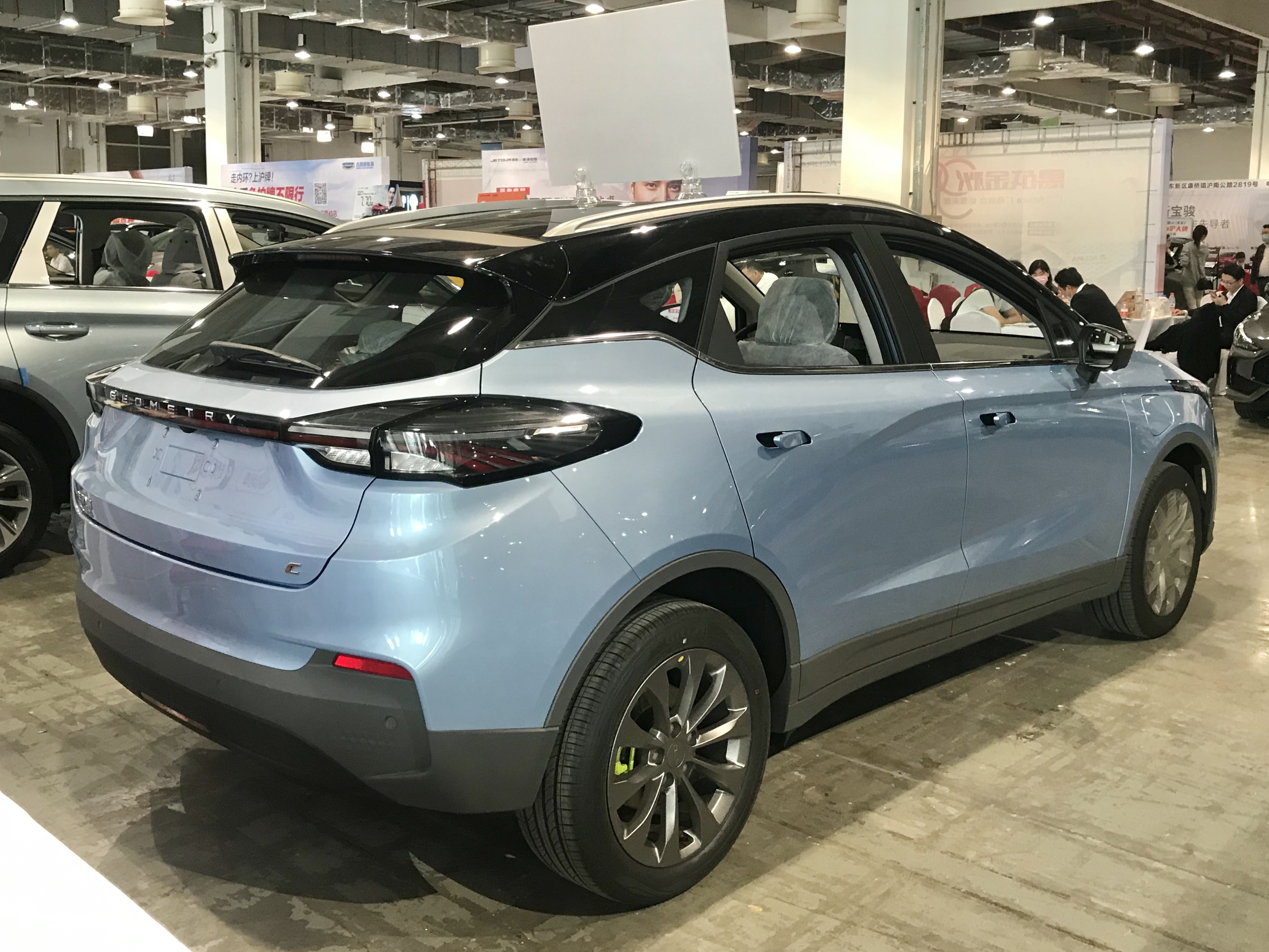
Rear view

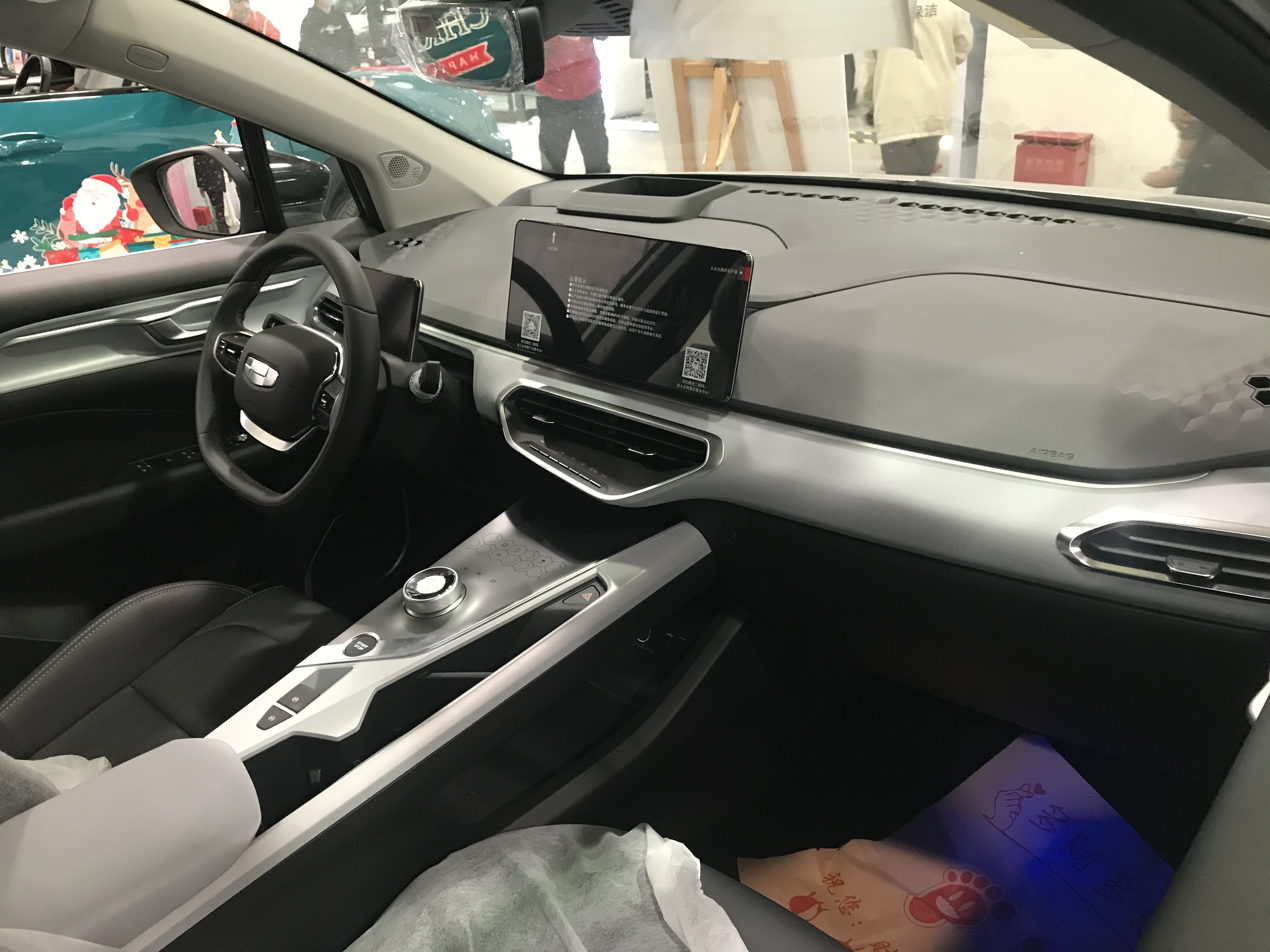
Interior

=== Geometry M6 ===
The Geometry M6 is the facelifted variant of the Geometry C launched in September 2022. The M6 features restyled front and rear end designs as well as the Harmony OS operating system by Huawei. The power comes from a 150 kW (201 hp; 204 PS) electric motor with two variants offering a 450 and 580 km (280 and 360 mi) electric range respectively.

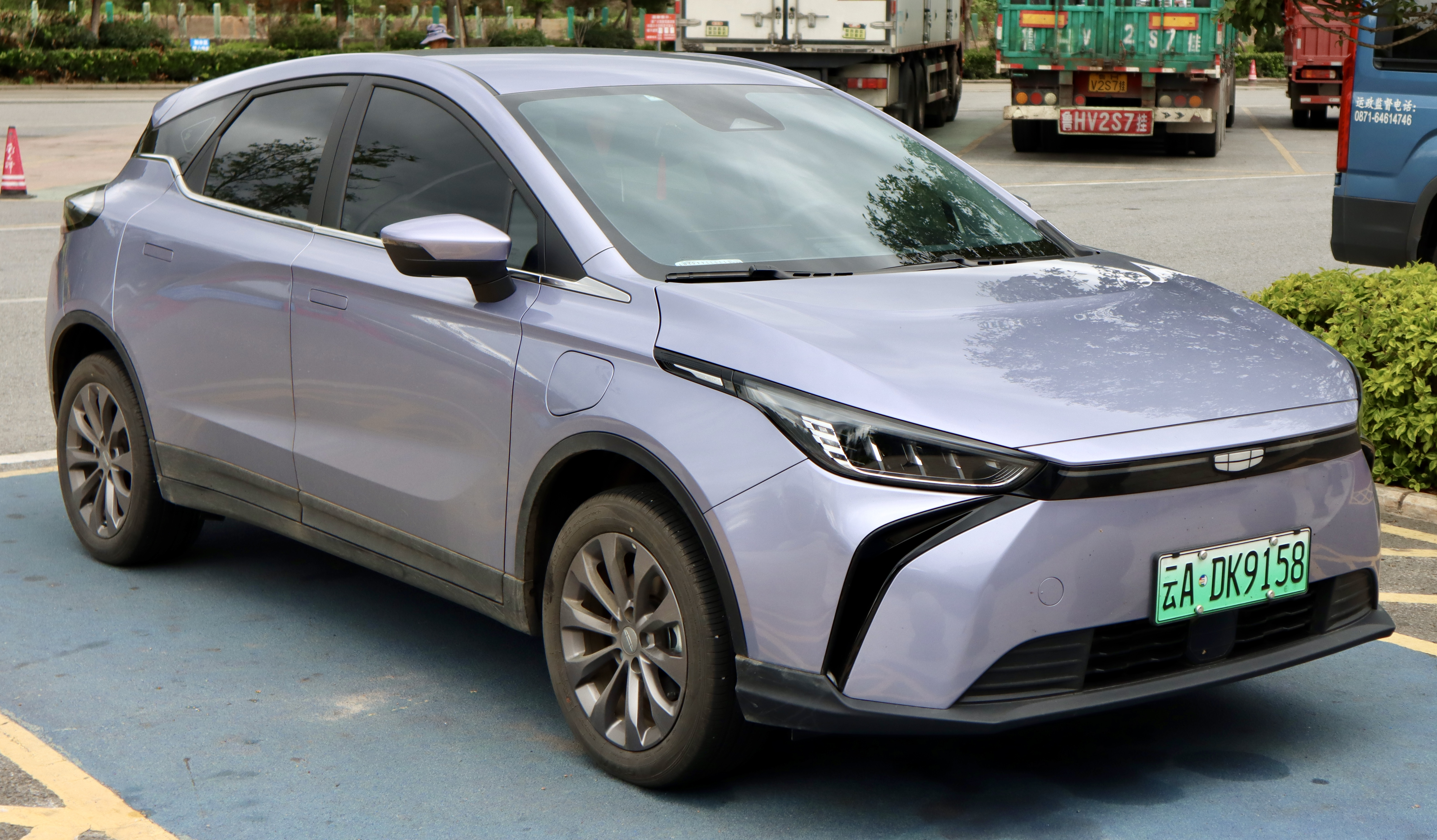
Geometry M6

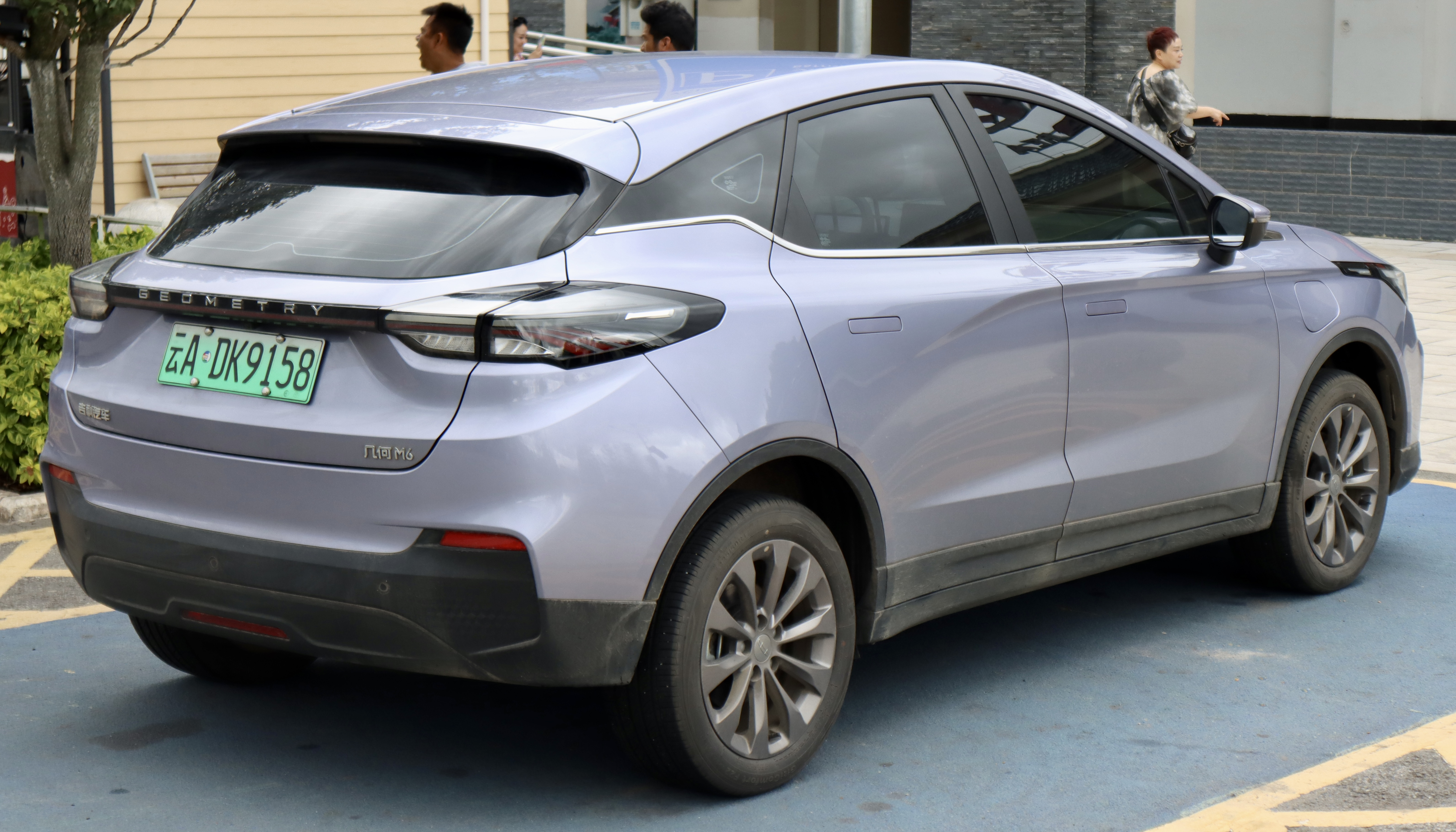
Rear view

== Sales ==
Year	China	Mexico
2020	5,277	—
2021	10,770	—
2022	28,414	—
2023	10,391	—
2024	4,656	136
2025	51	55
