= Geely Emgrand S =

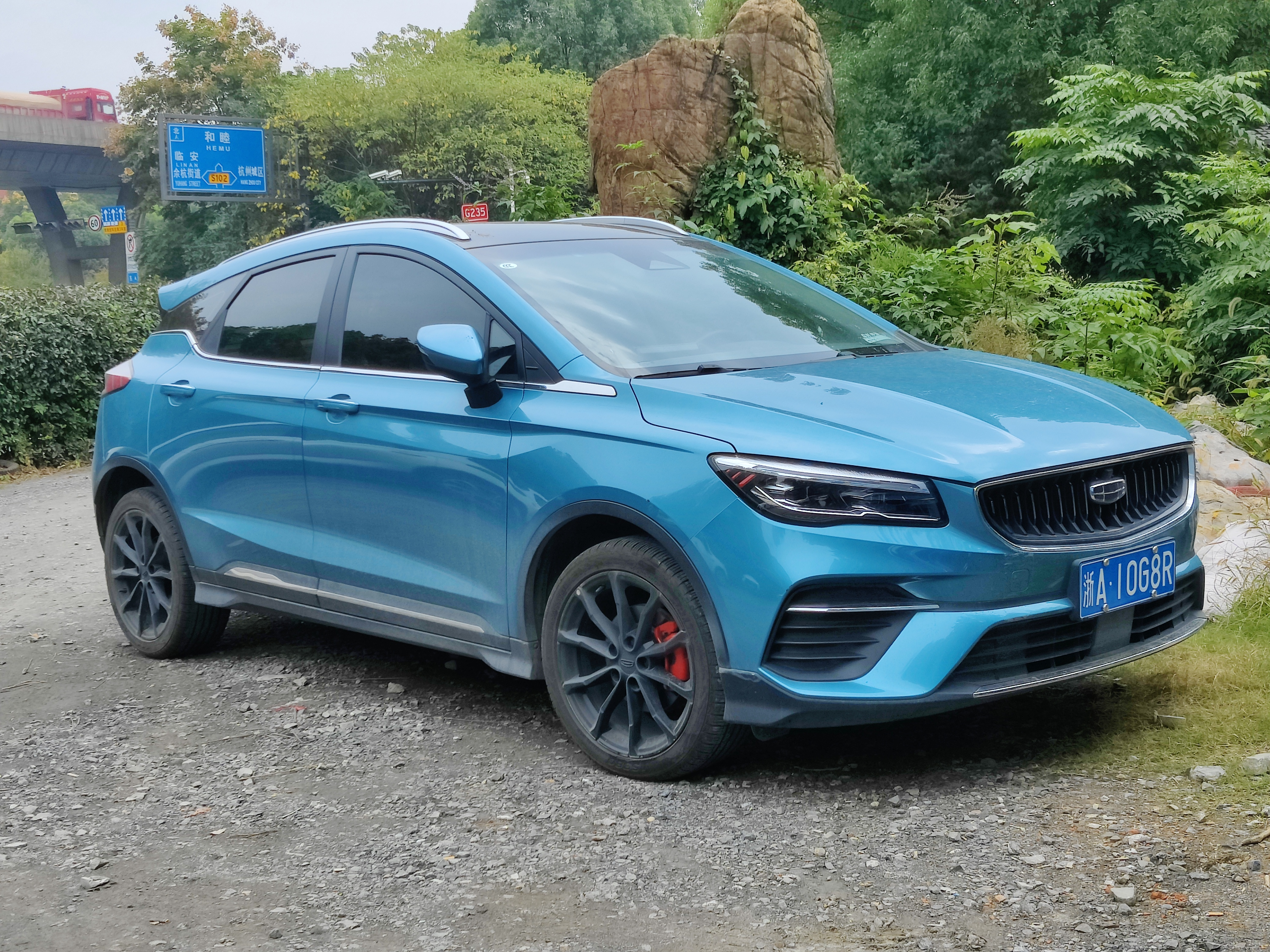
- 2021 Geely Emgrand S

Overview
- Manufacturer: Geely Auto
- Also called: Geely Emgrand GS (2016–2020)
- Production: 2016–2024
- Model years: 2017–2024

Body and chassis
- Class: Compact crossover SUV (C)
- Body style: 5-door SUV
- Layout: Front-engine, front-wheel-drive

The Geely Emgrand S and the original Geely Emgrand GS is a compact crossover SUV, produced by the Chinese auto brand Geely Auto, under the Emgrand brand.

The original design of the Emgrand GS production car launched in 2016 was previewed by the Emgrand Crossover Concept unveiled at the 2014 Beijing Auto Show. The whole Emgrand series was originally planned as a premium brand of Geely and was launched in 2009 before being repositioned as a product series with the logo being adapted as the new logo of the entire Geely brand.

== First generation (Emgrand GS; 2016) ==
Geely Emgrand GS
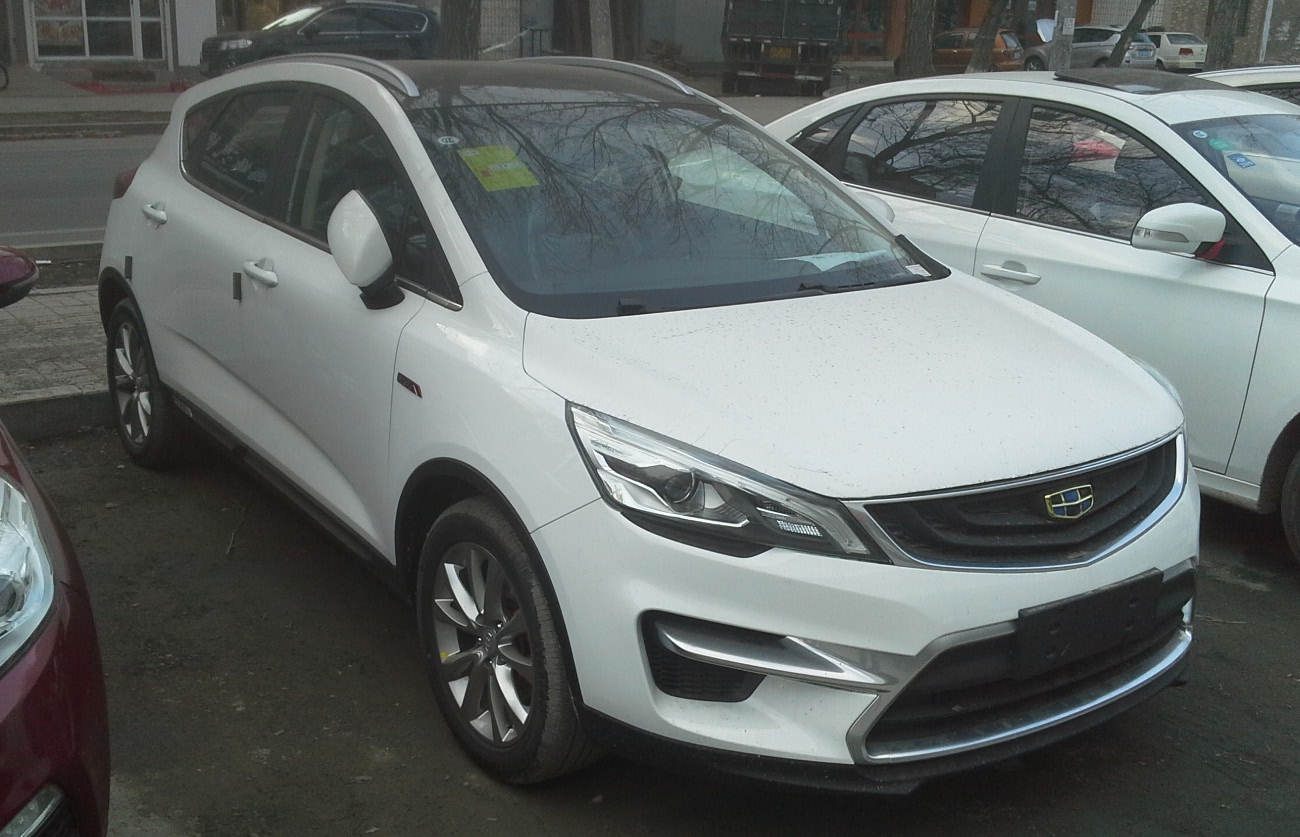

Overview
- Model code: FE-7
- Production: 2016–2021
- Model years: 2017–2021
- Assembly: China: Linhai
- Designer: Peter Horbury

Body and chassis
- Class: Compact crossover SUV
- Body style: 5-door SUV
- Layout: Front-engine, front-wheel-drive
- Platform: Geely FE
- Related: Geely Emgrand GL; Geometry C

Powertrain
- Engine: 1.3 L 4G13 turbo I4; 1.4 L JLB-4G14TB I4; 1.5 L JLH-3G15TD turbo I3; 1.8 L 4G18 I4
- Transmission: 6 speed manual 6-speed DCT

Dimensions
- Wheelbase: 2,700 mm (106.3 in)
- Length: 4,440 mm (174.8 in)
- Width: 1,833 mm (72.2 in)
- Height: 1,560 mm (61.4 in)
- Curb weight: 1,288–1,360 kg (2,840–2,998 lb)

Originally launched as the Geely Emgrand GS, the compact crossover is developed from the same platform of the Geely Emgrand GL midsize sedan. Price of the Emgrand GS ranges from 77,800 yuan to 108,800 yuan. Engines are a 1.3-litre turbo producing 130 horsepower (97 kW; 132 PS) and 185 N⋅m (136 lb⋅ft; 19 kg⋅m) of torque, and a 1.8-litre producing 133 horsepower (99 kW; 135 PS) and 170 N⋅m (125 lb⋅ft; 17 kg⋅m) of torque.

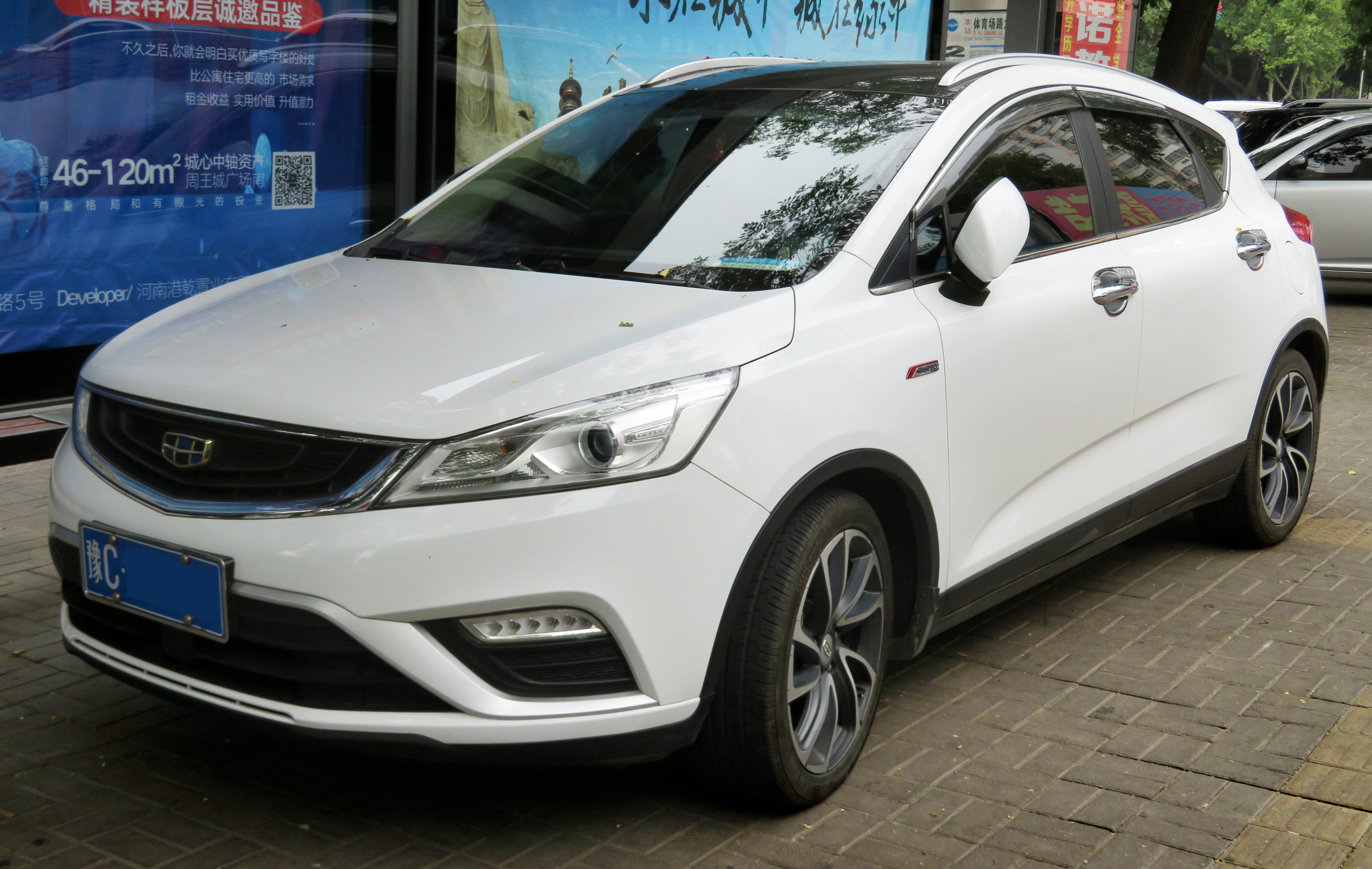
Geely Emgrand GS Elegant (front)

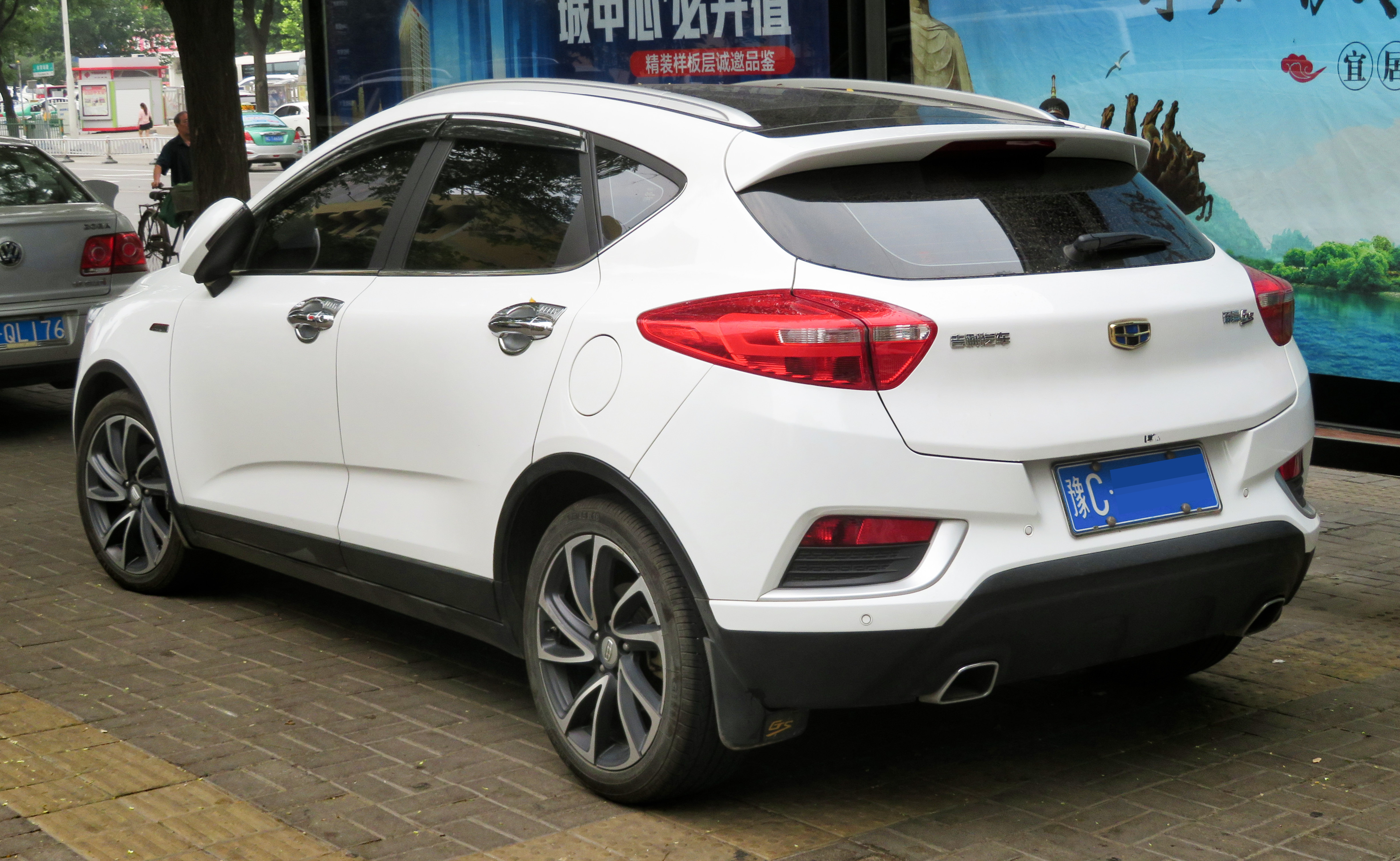
Geely Emgrand GS Elegant (rear)
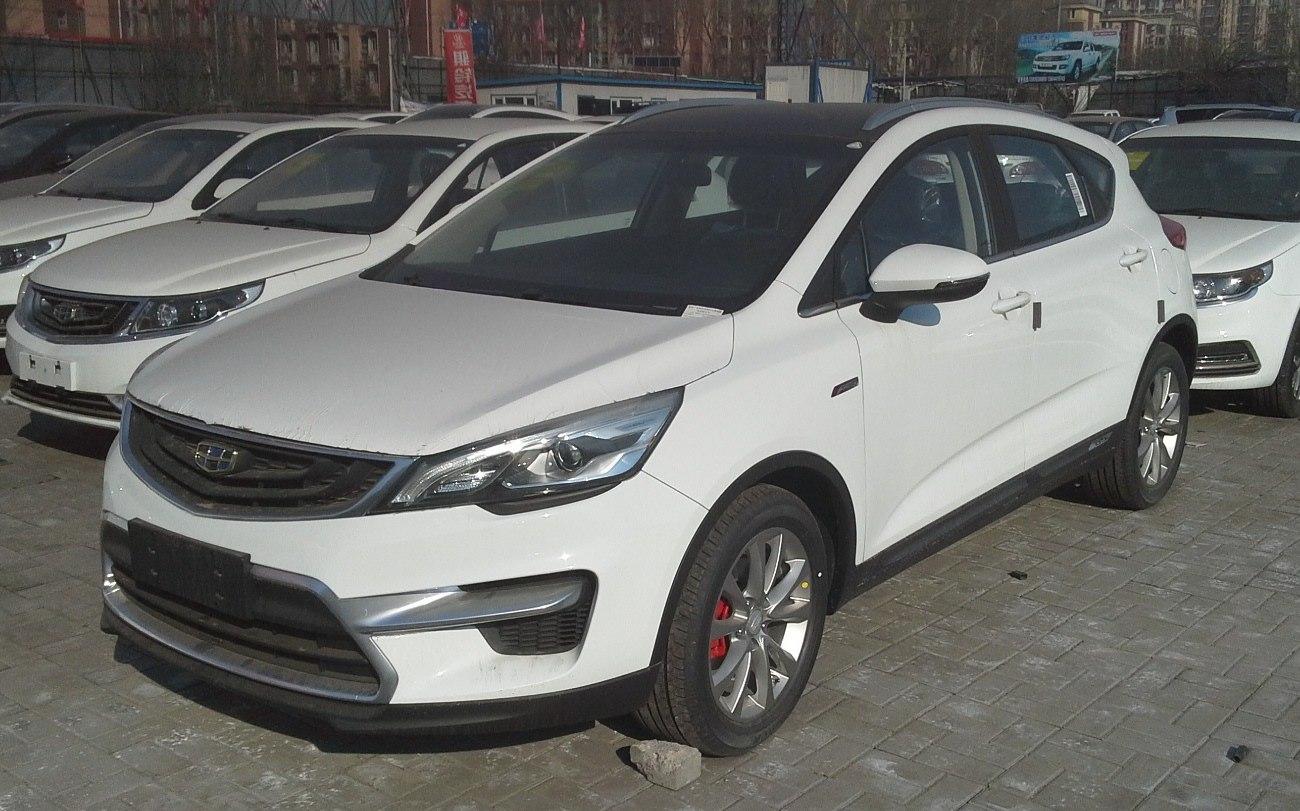
Geely Emgrand GS Sport (front)

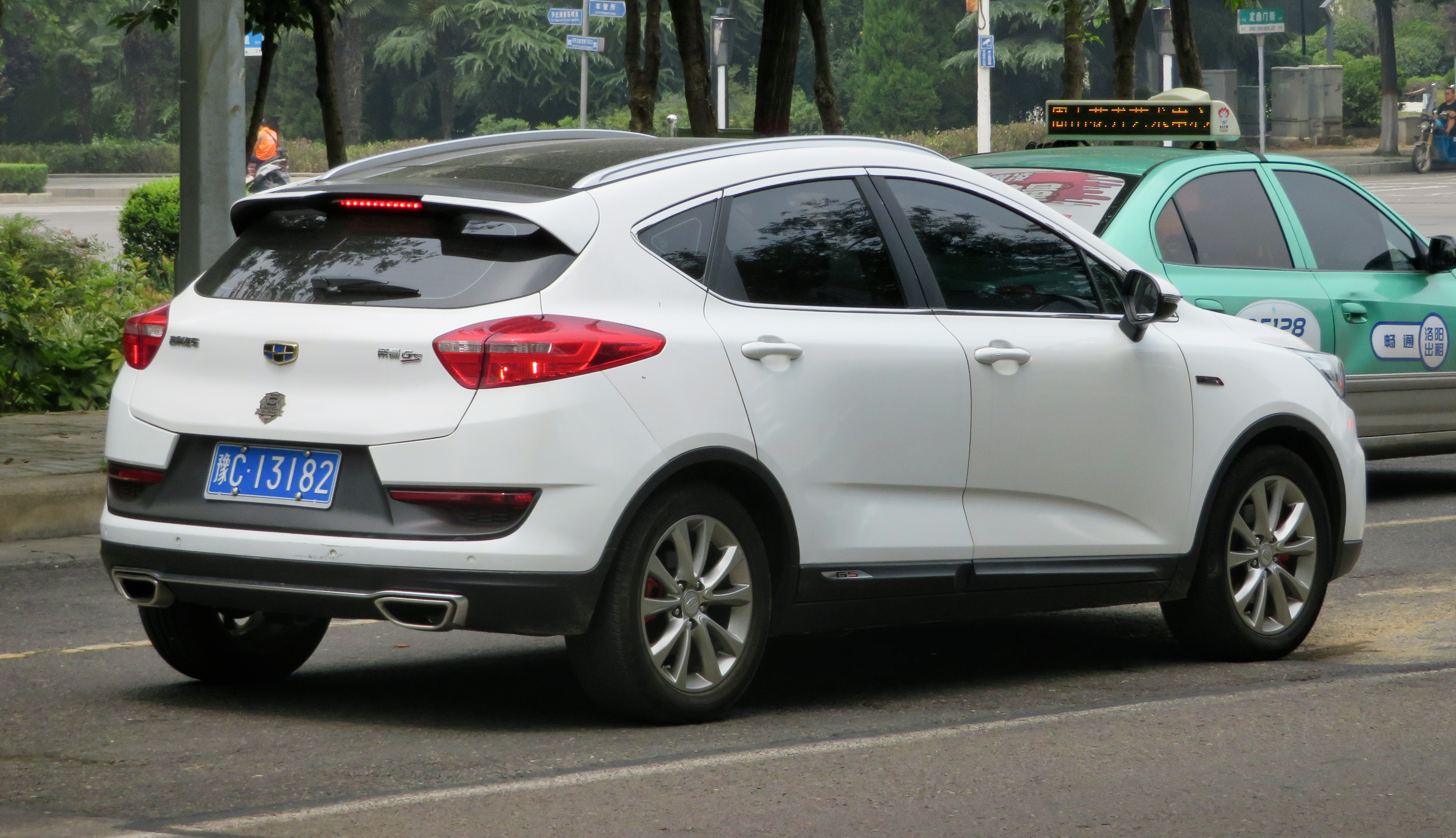
Geely Emgrand GS Sport (rear)

=== Geely Emgrand GSe ===
Revealed in 2018, the Geely Emgrand GSe is the full electric variant of the Geely Emgrand GS crossover. Prices after subsidies starts from 119,800 to 145,800 yuan. The Geely Emgrand GSe is powered by a single electric motor producing 163 horsepower (122 kW; 165 PS) and 250 newton-metres (184 lb⋅ft; 25 kg⋅m) of torque, mated to a 52–61 kWh (190–220 MJ) battery pack with a range (NEDC) of 353–400 kilometres (219–249 mi). Fast charging on a 60 kW fast charger takes half an hour and charges from 30% to 80%, a full charge at 220V would takes 9 hours. The 0 to 100 kilometres per hour (0 to 62 mph) acceleration of the Geely Emgrand GSe takes 9.9 seconds.

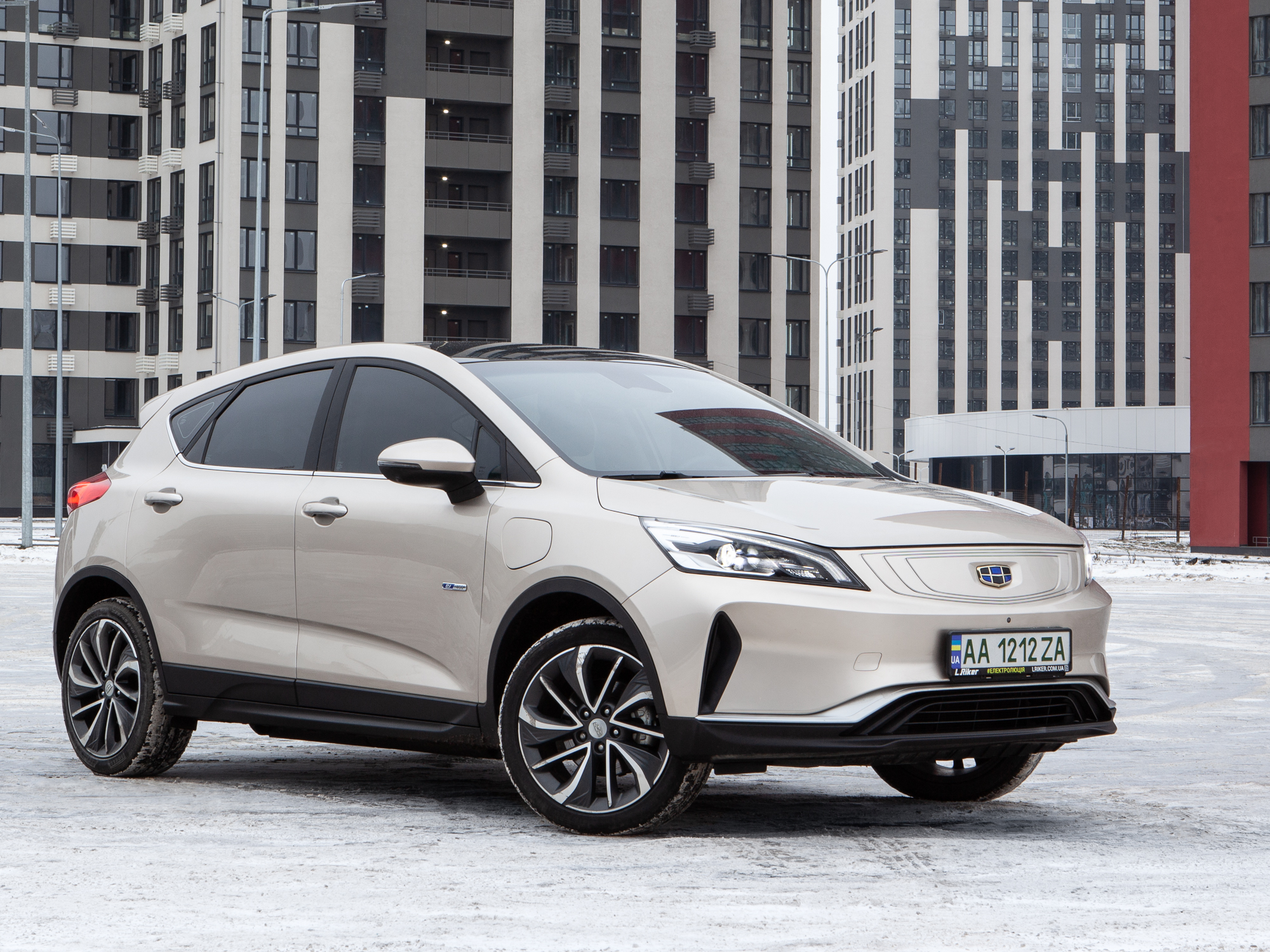
Geely Emgrand GSe right front

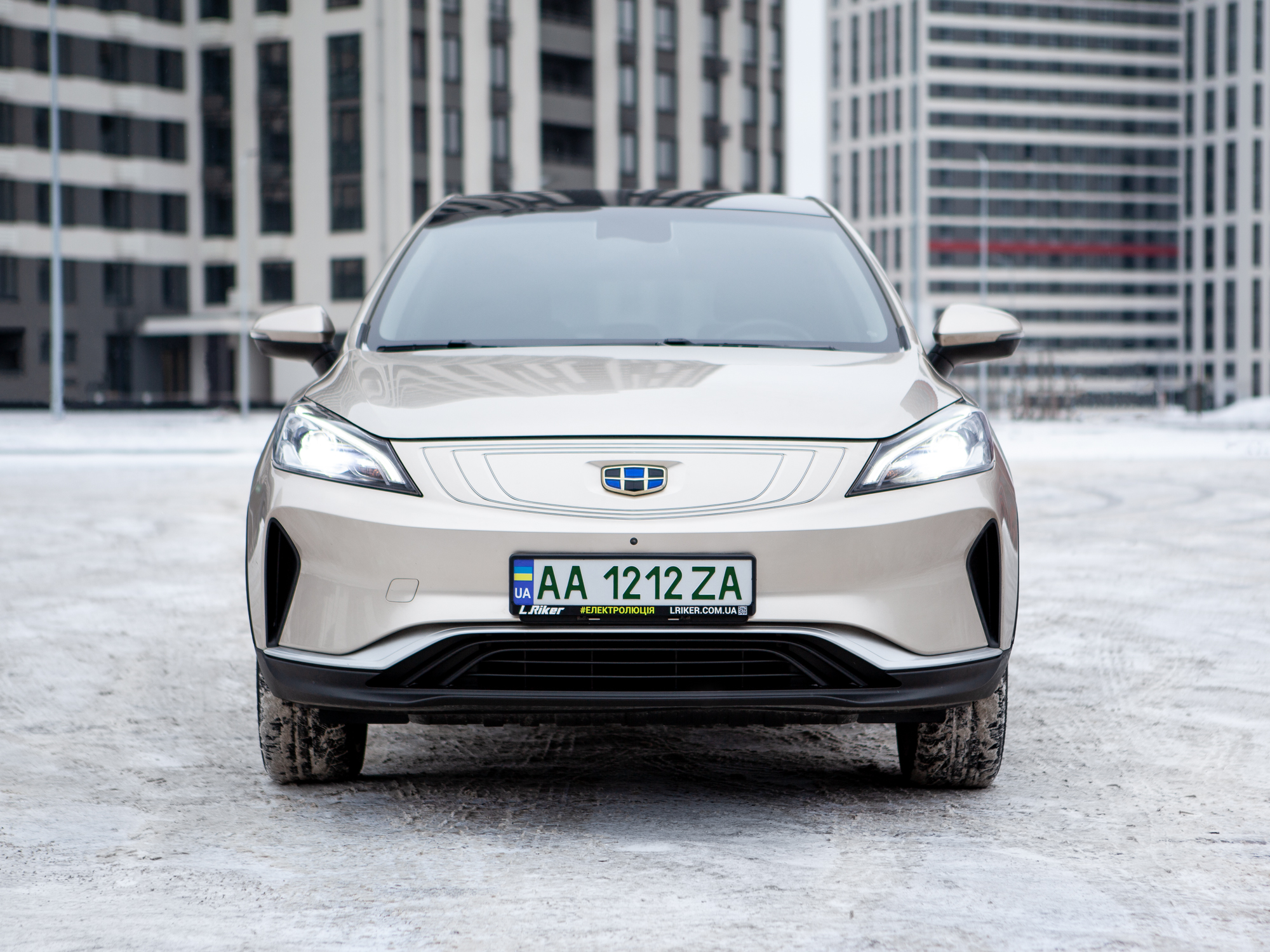
Geely Emgrand GSe front

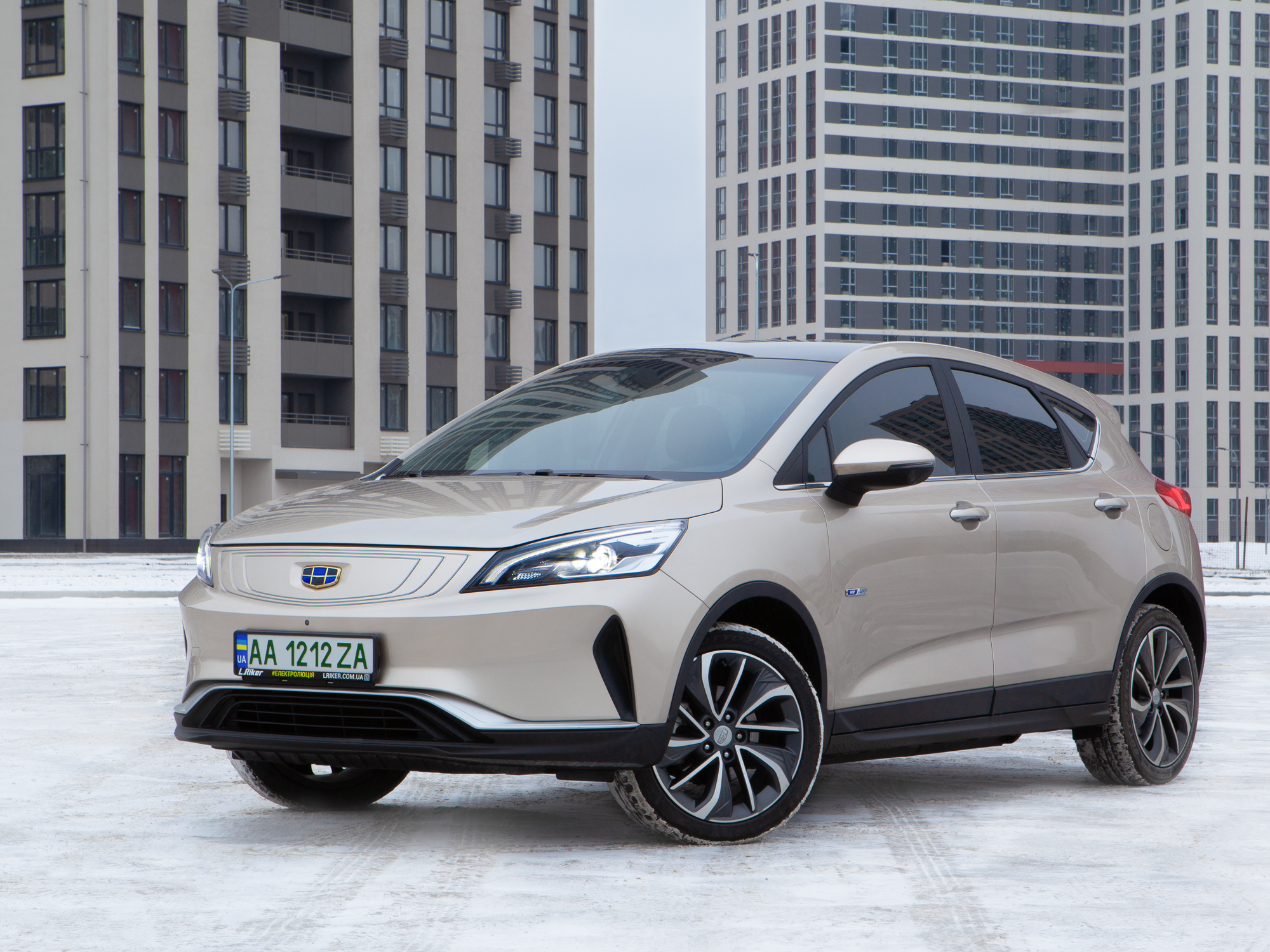
Geely Emgrand GSe left front

== Second generation (Emgrand S; 2021) ==
Geely Emgrand S
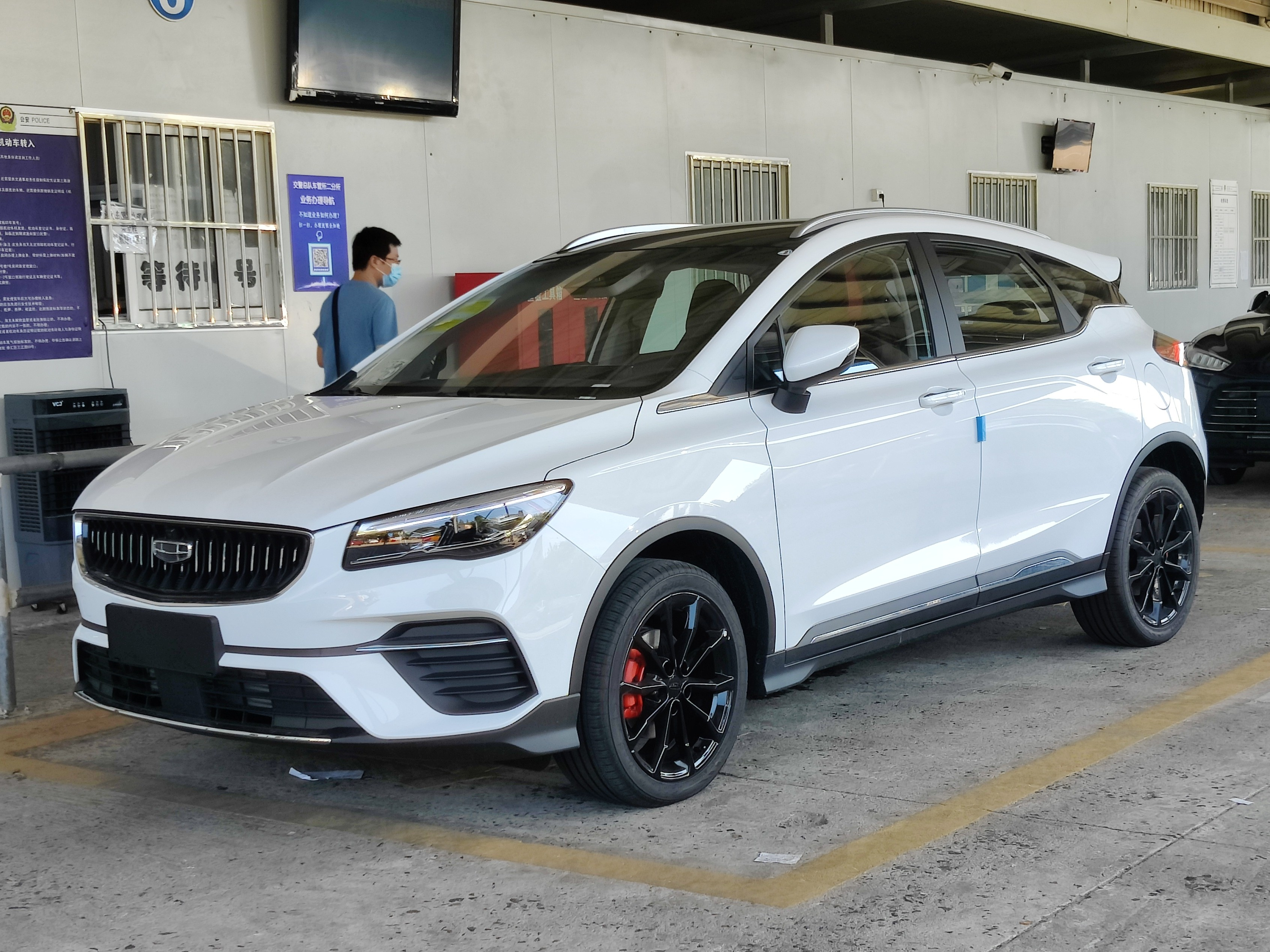

Overview
- Production: 2021–2024
- Model years: 2022–2024
- Assembly: China: Linhai
- Designer: Peter Horbury

Body and chassis
- Class: Compact crossover SUV
- Body style: 5-door SUV
- Layout: Front-engine, front-wheel-drive
- Platform: Geely FE
- Related: Geely Emgrand L Geometry C

Powertrain
- Engine: 1.3 L 4G13 turbo I4; 1.4 L JLB-4G14TB I4; 1.5 L JLH-3G15TD turbo I3; 1.8 L 4G18 I4
- Transmission: 6 speed manual 6-speed DCT

Dimensions
- Wheelbase: 2,700 mm (106.3 in)
- Length: 4,430 mm (174.4 in)
- Width: 1,833 mm (72.2 in)
- Height: 1,573 mm (61.9 in)
- Curb weight: 1,345–1,400 kg (2,965–3,086 lb)

The successor of the Geely Emgrand GS is essentially an extensive facelift of the model, and was launched for the 2021 model year called the Emgrand S. The Emgrand S features completely redesigned front, rear, and side and features tail lamps and a floating roof in the same style as the Geometry C. The redesigned model now measures 4,430 mm (174.4 in) long, which is 10 mm (0.4 in) shorter than the Emgrand GS and 1,573 mm (61.9 in) high, which is 13 mm (0.5 in) higher than the Emgrand GS.

The interior of the Emgrand S is restyled with a new dashboard design and a 10.25-inch touchscreen that incorporates the infotainment system is placed above the air vents above the engine start/stop button and HVAC switches.

The Emgrand S is powered by a Mitsubishi-sourced 1.4-litre turbocharged four-cylinder petrol engine producing 139 horsepower (104 kW; 141 PS) and 235 N⋅m (173 lb⋅ft; 24 kg⋅m) of torque. The engine is paired with either a six-speed manual transmission or a CVT gearbox. Geely claims a fuel consumption of 5.9 L/100 km (48 mpg_{‑imp}; 40 mpg_{‑US}) for the Emgrand S.

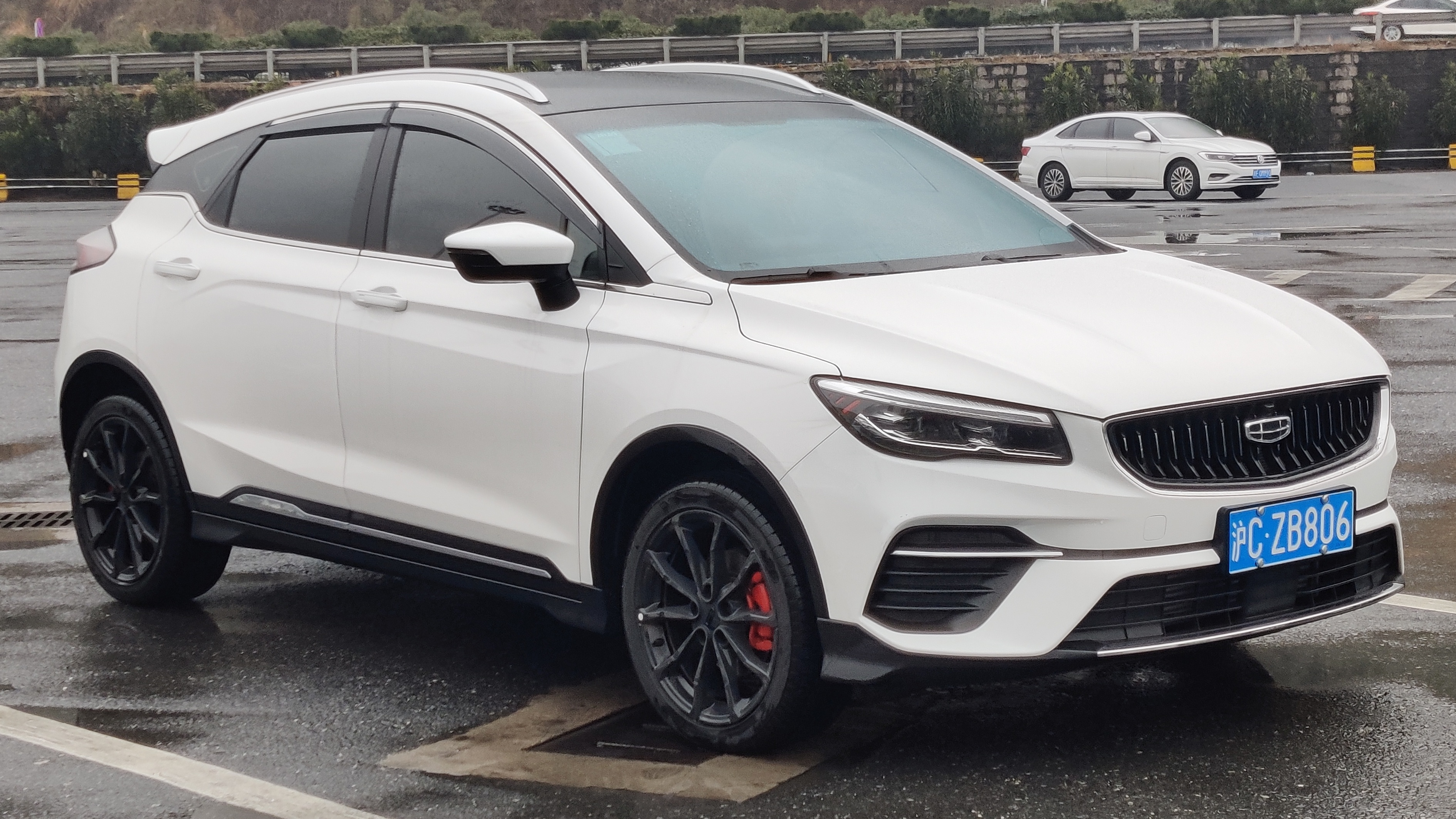
Geely Emgrand S front

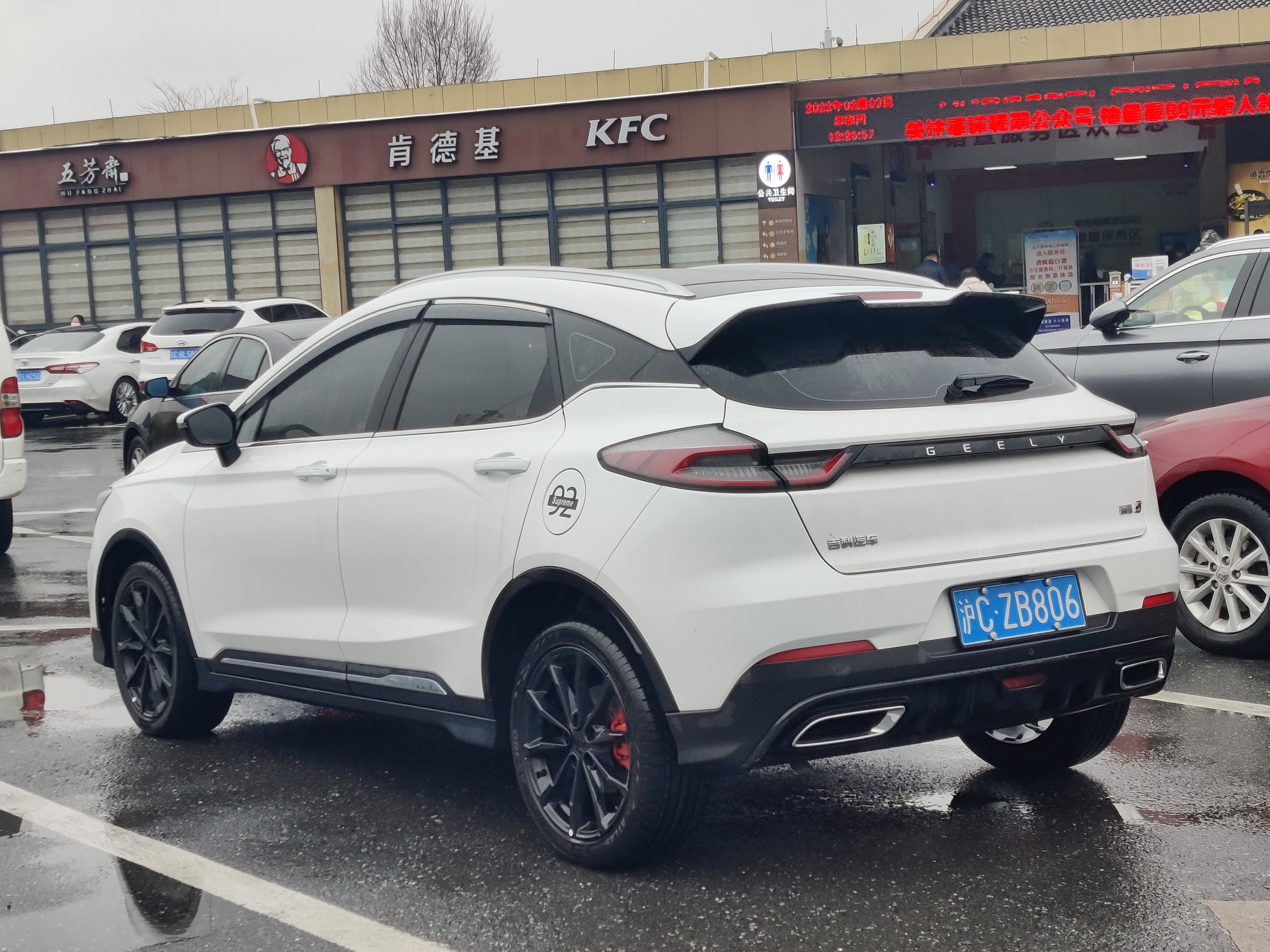
Geely Emgrand S rear

== Sales ==
Year	China
2023	9,091
2024	1,700
2025	5
