= Emgrand =

Chinese automobile marque

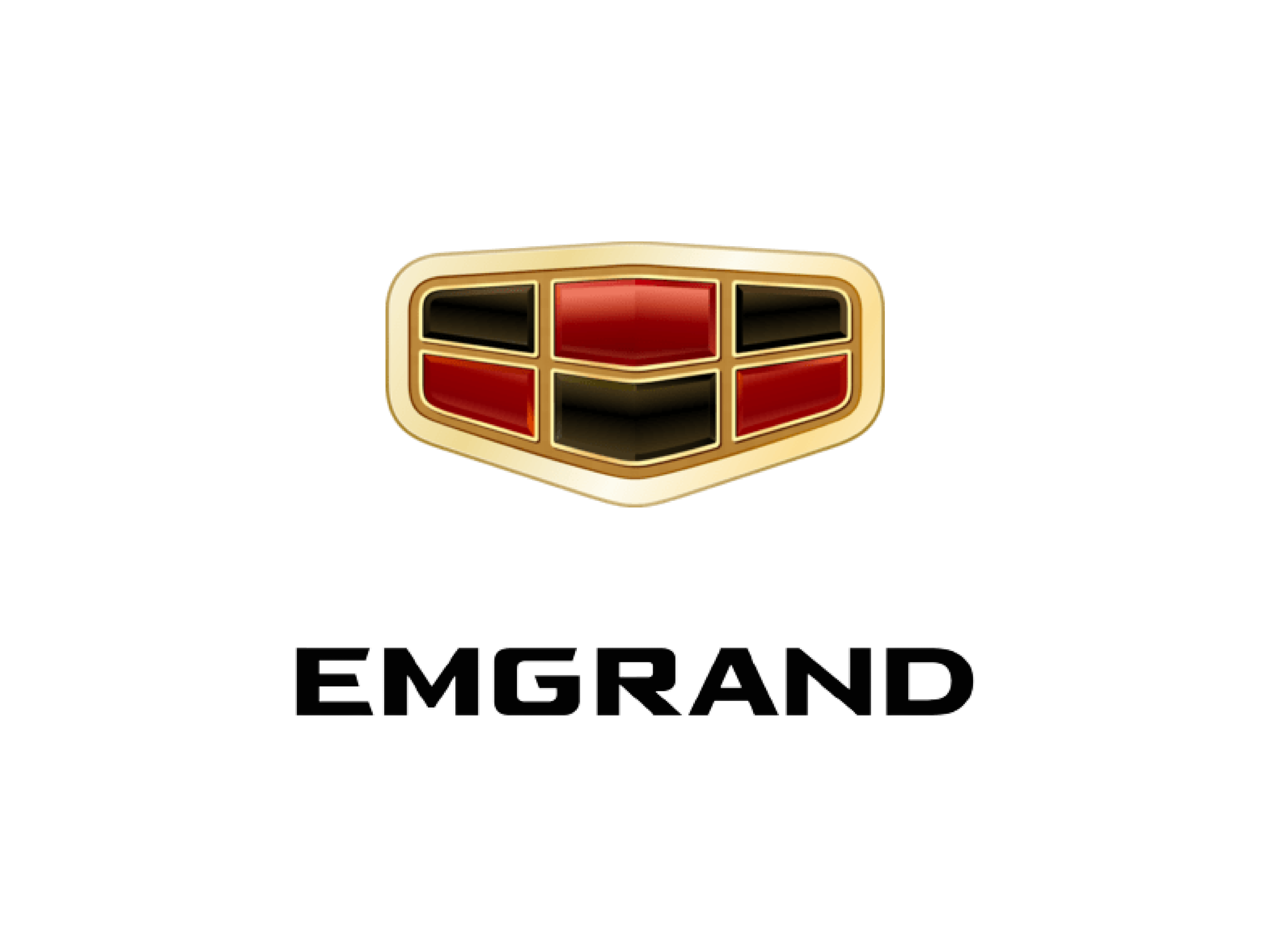

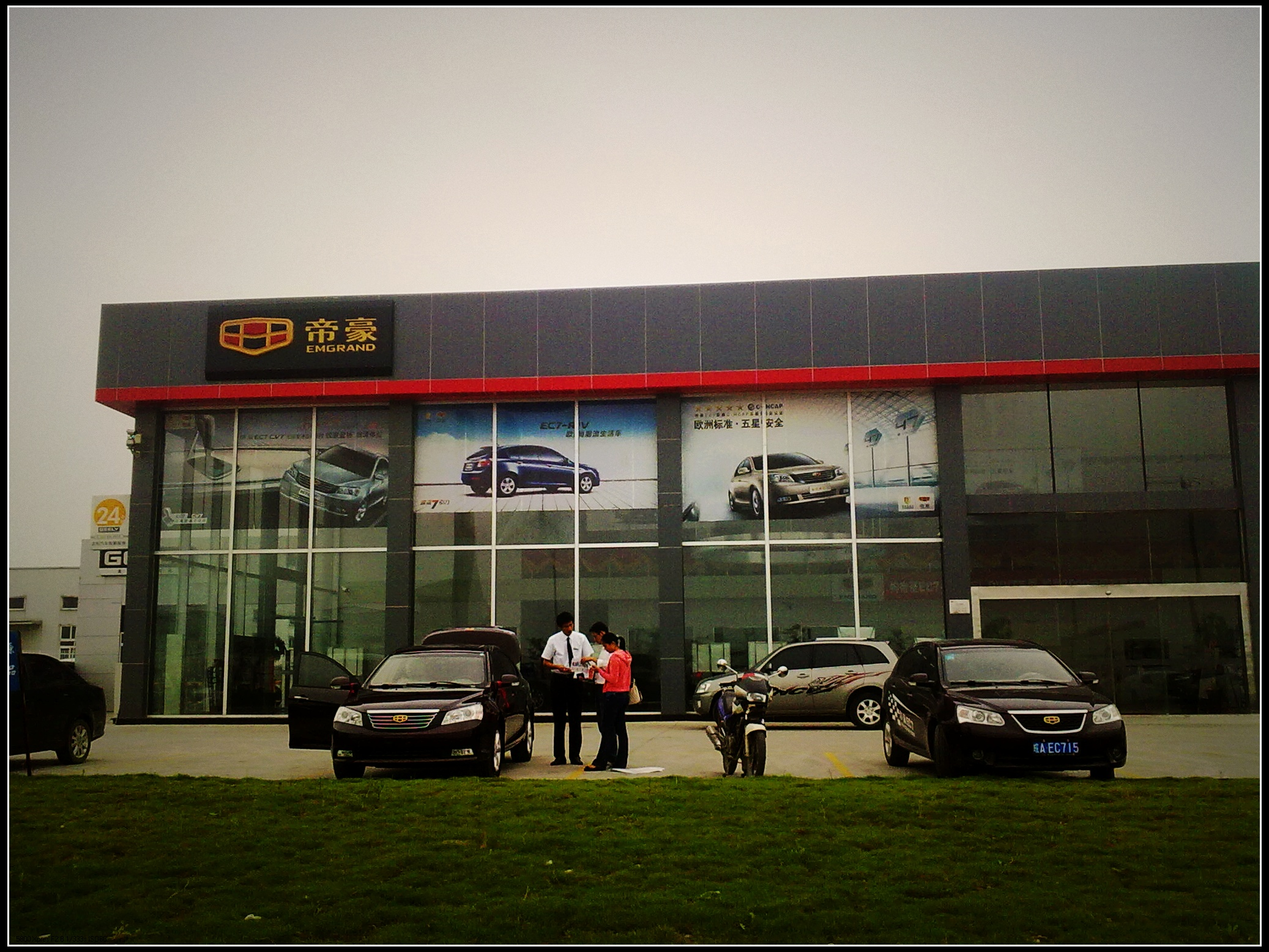
- Emgrand's dealership in Shanghai, China
- Native name: 帝豪
- Company type: Private
- Industry: Automobile manufacturing
- Founded: August 2009; 16 years ago in Shanghai, China
- Defunct: 2014
- Fate: Merged with Geely
- Parent: Geely
Emgrand
- Chinese: 帝豪
- Literal meaning: Imperial
Transcriptions
Standard Mandarin
- Hanyu Pinyin: Dìháo
- Wade–Giles: Ti^{4}-hao^{2}
Yue: Cantonese
- Yale Romanization: Daihòuh
- Jyutping: Dai3 hou4
- Website: Official website

Emgrand was an automobile marque owned by the Chinese automotive manufacturer Geely. It was launched in August 2009 and discontinued in 2014 after its products were rebranded as Geely. Emgrand ceased to be a separate brand and was demoted to being a model name under the Geely brand.

== History ==
The Emgrand marque was publicly unveiled at the 2009 Auto Shanghai autoshow, together with two other new Geely brands, Englon and Gleagle.

The first Emgrand EC7 production models for retail sale were completed in July 2009 at the Geely plant in Ningbo, Zhejiang. The EC7 went on sale in China in mid-August 2009 as the marque's launch model. The second Emgrand production model, the Emgrand EC8, was launched in October 2010.

In December 2011 it was announced that Emgrand would be launched in the United Kingdom in late-2012, with the Emgrand EC7 planned to be the first model to go on sale. Emgrand vehicles were intended to be distributed in the UK by Manganese Bronze Holdings (which Geely owns), trading under the name Geely Auto UK. The launch was subsequently put on hold.

The Emgrand marque was discontinued in 2014 and its products were rebranded Emgrand series under Geely.

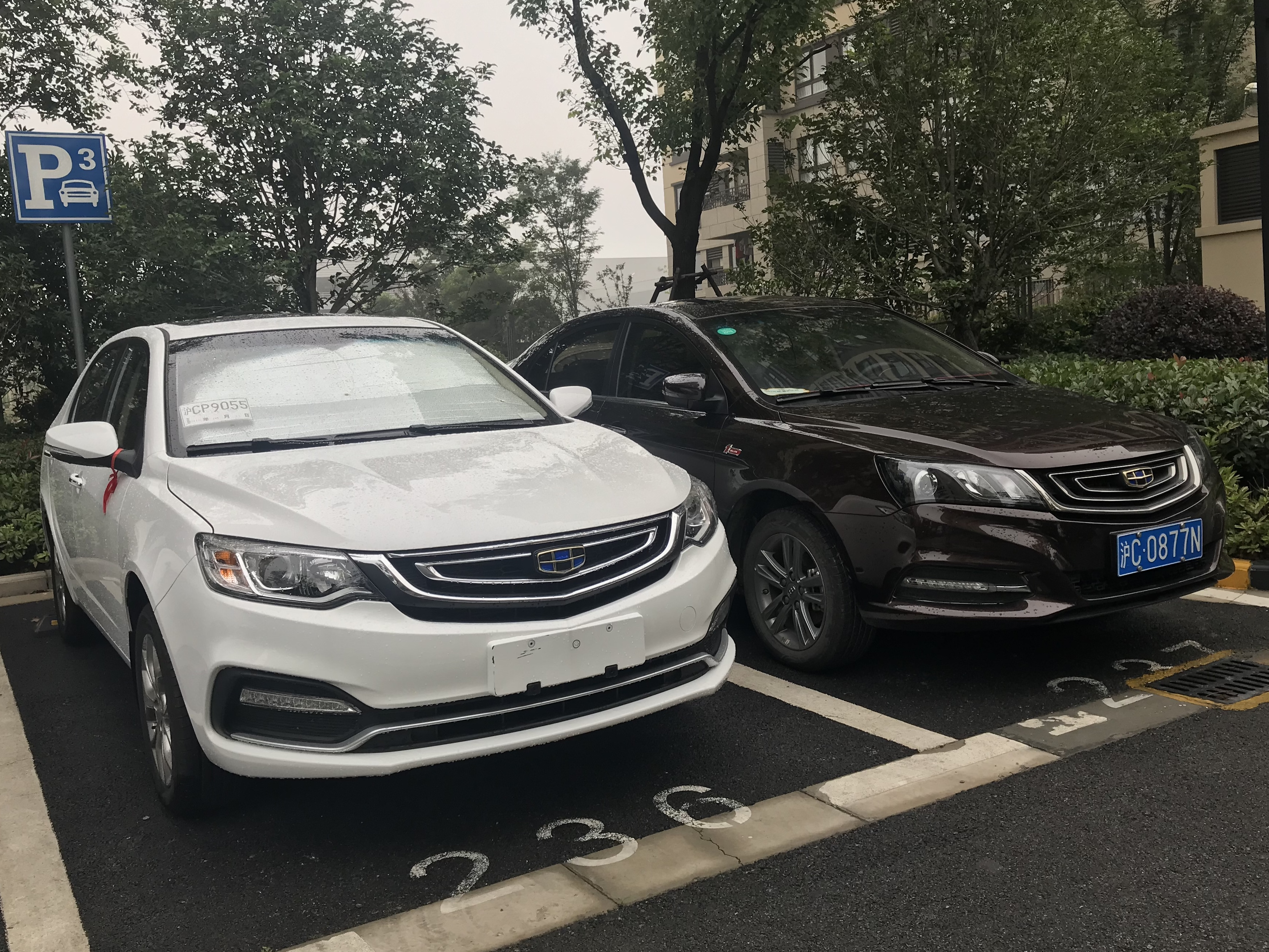
Geely Yuanjing (left) and Emgrand (right) sedans both featuring the Emgrand badge which is now the new Geely badge.

== Products ==
=== Production models ===
The following Emgrand were produced:

- Emgrand EC7 (compact front-wheel drive sedan and hatchback)
- Emgrand EC7-RV
- Emgrand EC8
- Emgrand X7 (SUV)
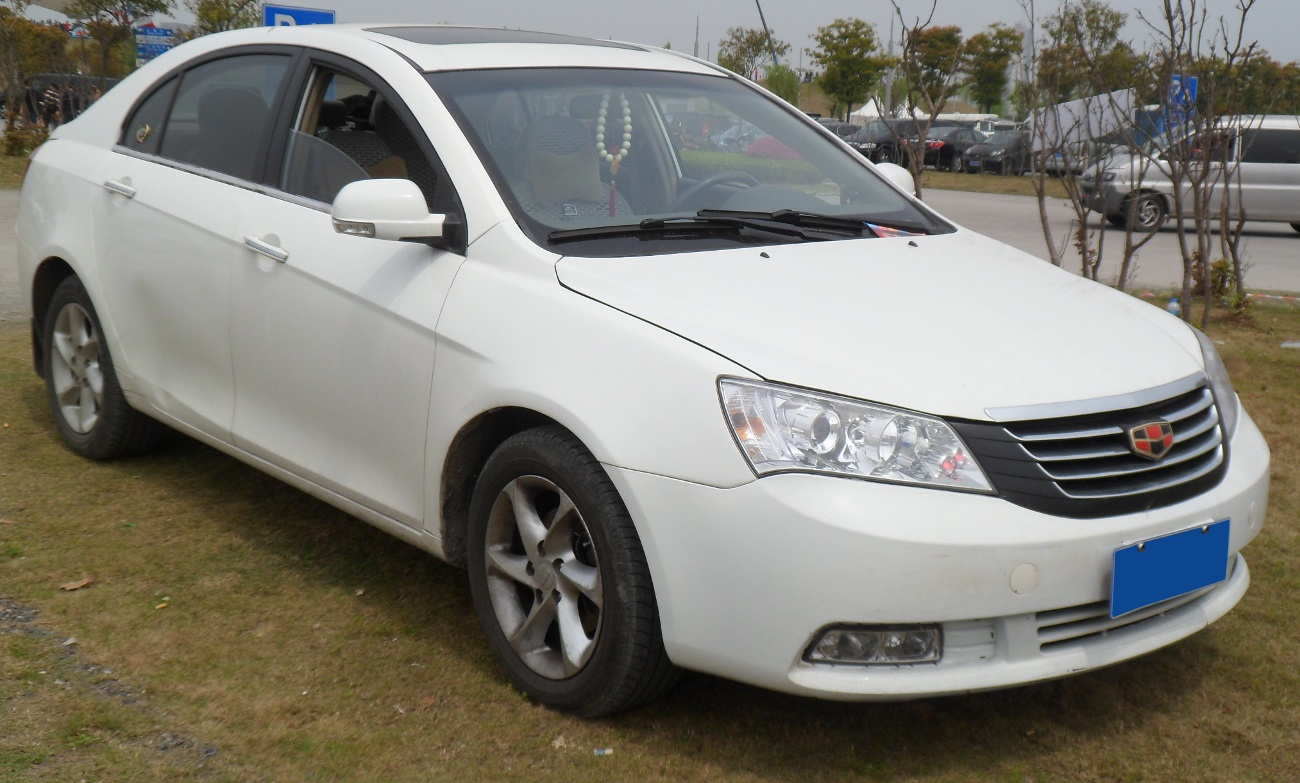
An Emgrand EC7 sedan

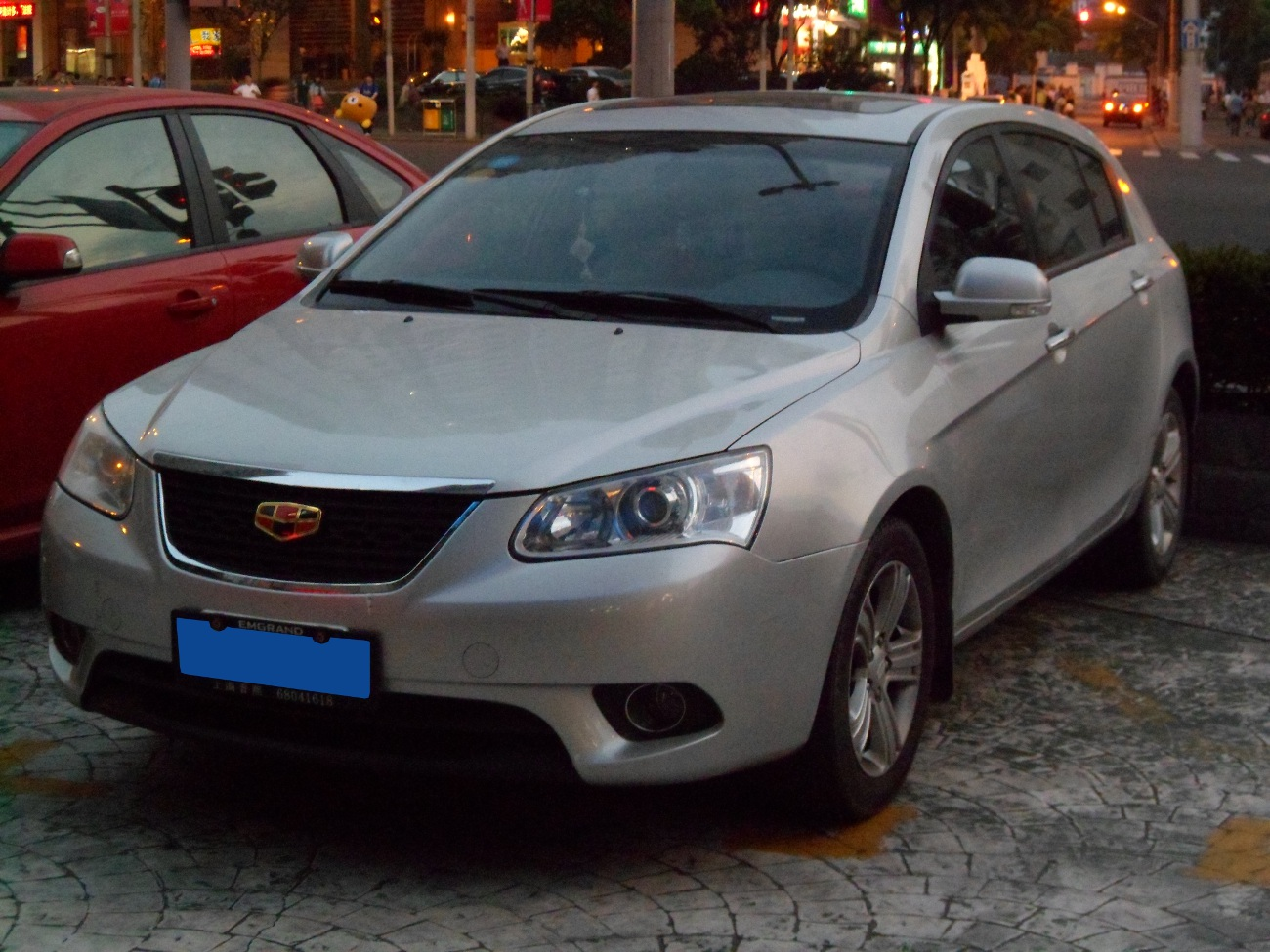
An Emgrand EC7 hatchback

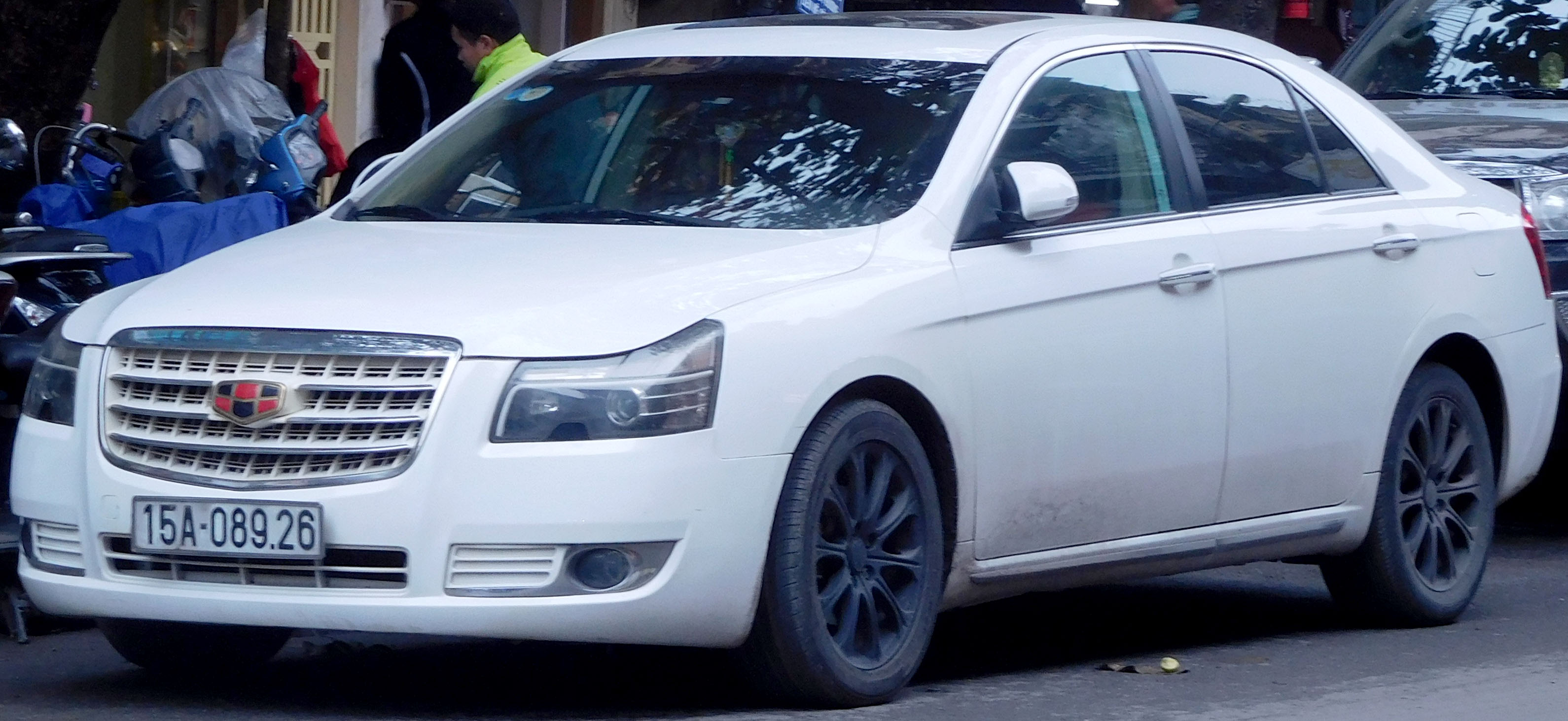
An Emgrand EC8

=== Concept cars ===
A concept of the Emgrand GE limousine car was unveiled at 2009 Auto Shanghai autoshow, with a refined version later shown at the 2010 Beijing Auto Show.

Emgrand unveiled three new concept cars at the 2012 Beijing Auto Show – the EX8, EX9 and GE.

Emgrand unveiled the KC concept car at the 2013 Shanghai Auto Show, a Mid-size sedan previewing the Emgrand EC9 production model. Due to the discontinuation of the Emgrand brand one year after, the production model was sold under the Geely brand as the Geely Borui.

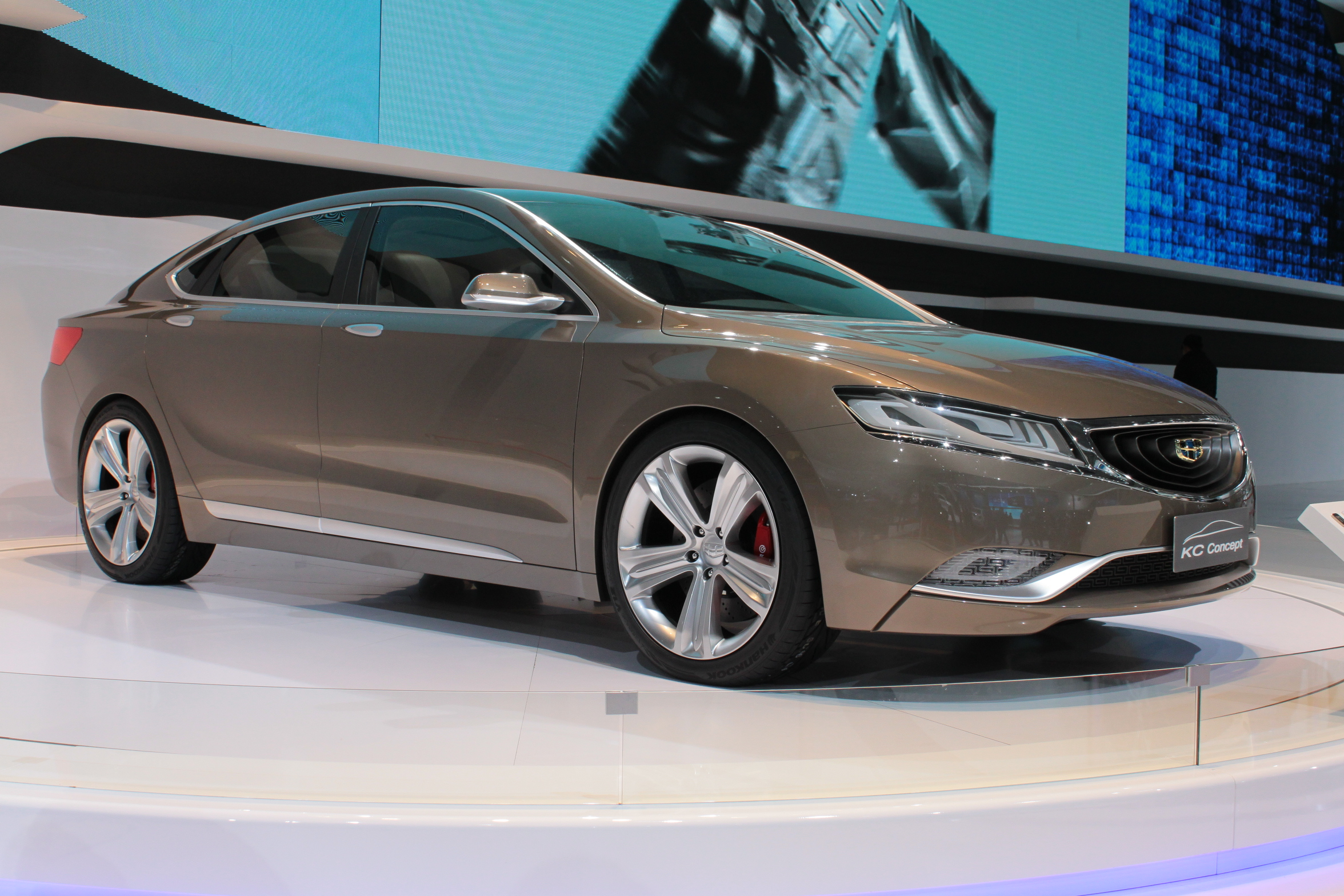
The Emgrand KC concept car

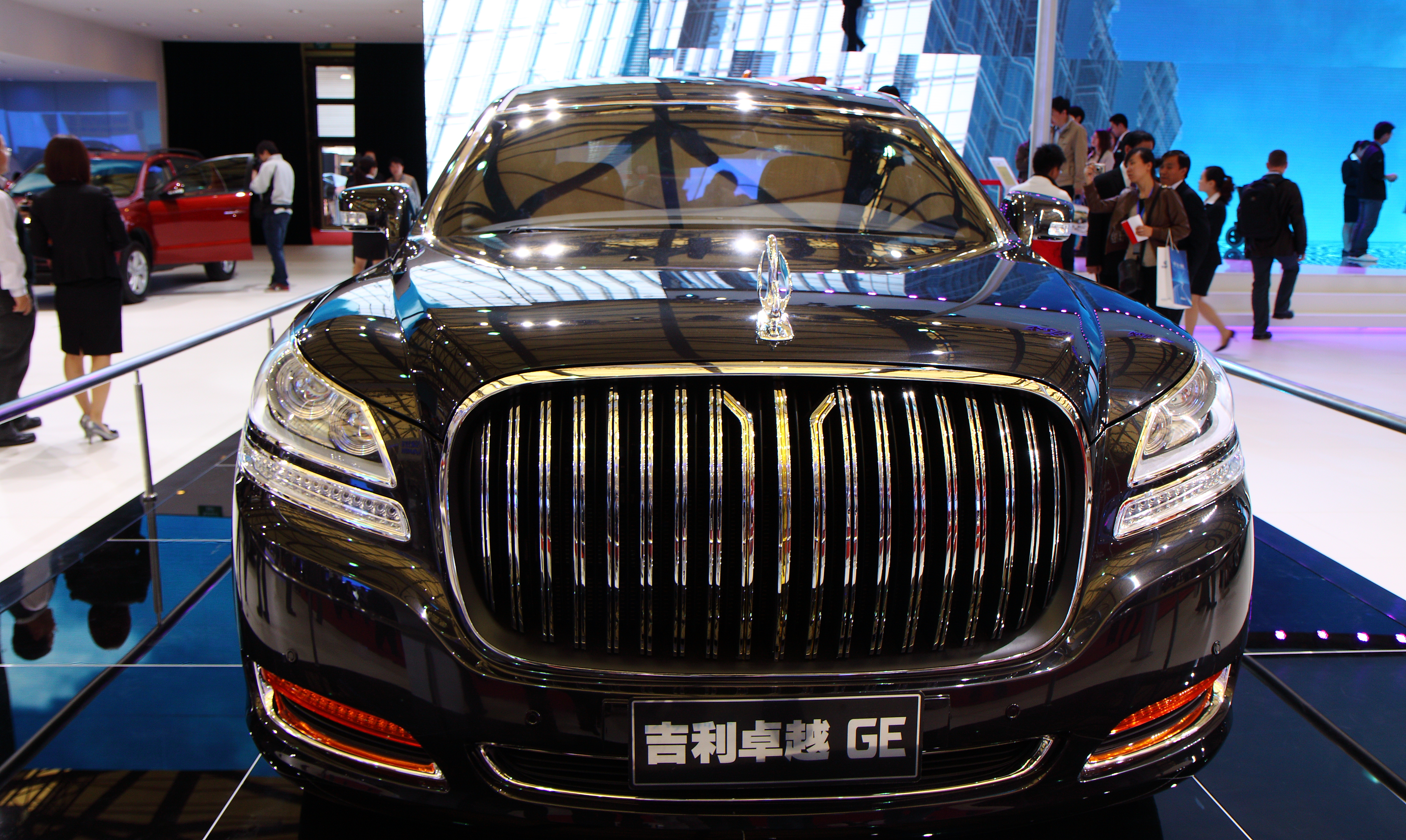
Emgrand GE

== Production ==
Emgrand vehicles were principally assembled at the Geely plant in Ningbo, Zhejiang.

== Sales ==
203,491 Emgrand vehicles were sold in China in 2013, making it the 23rd largest-selling car brand in the country (and the eighth largest-selling Chinese brand).
