= Emgrand GE =

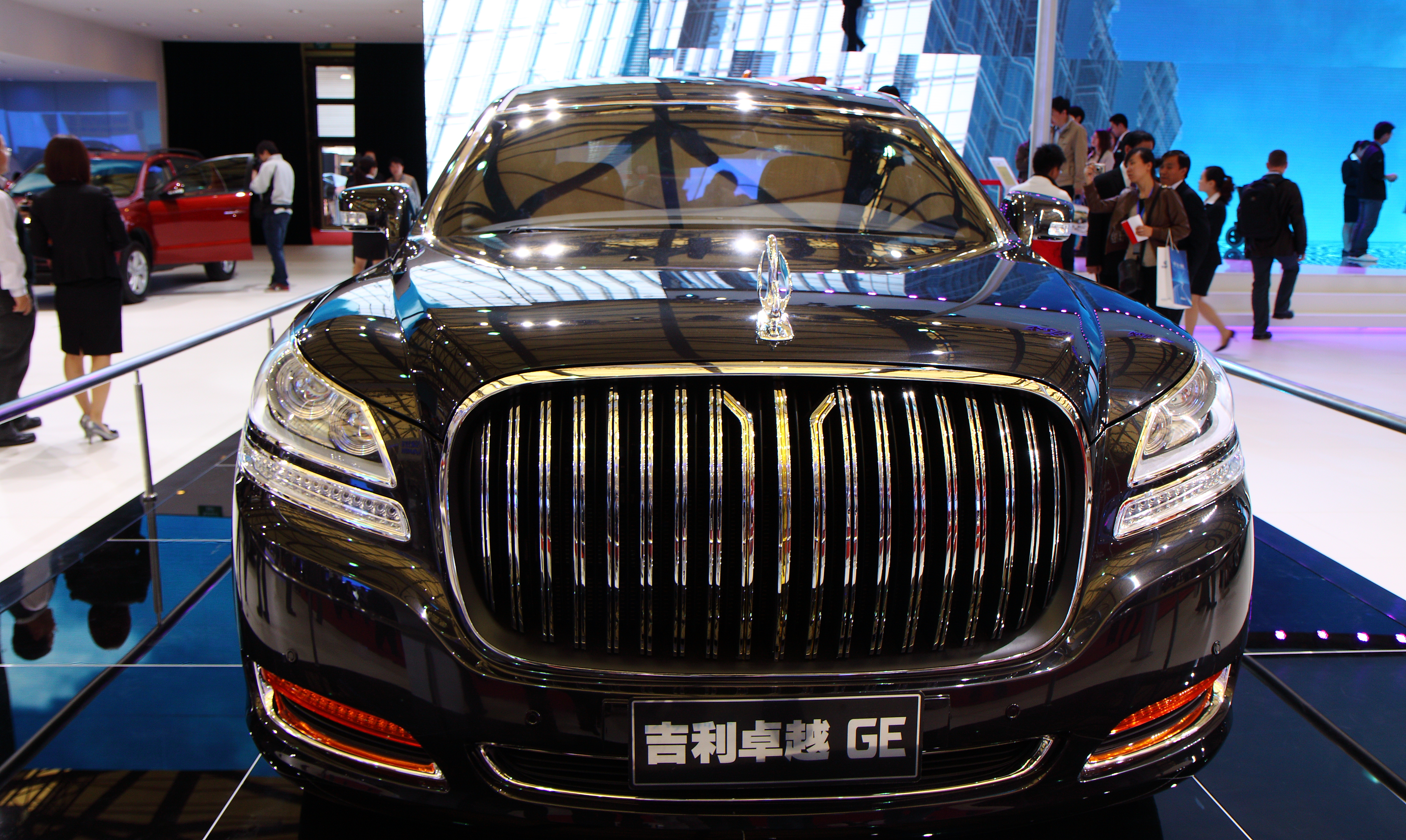
- Shanghai Motor Show 2011

Overview
- Manufacturer: Emgrand (Geely Auto)
- Also called: Geely GE; Geely Emgrand GE; Emgrand GE concept
- Model years: 2009 (Concept); 2010 (Production); 2012 (Geely Concept)

Body and chassis
- Class: Full-size luxury
- Body style: 4-door sedan
- Layout: Front-engine, rear-wheel-drive

Powertrain
- Engine: 2.4L JLD-4G24 I4 (petrol, PHEV)
- Transmission: 6-Speed Automatic

Dimensions
- Wheelbase: 124.0 in (3,150 mm)
- Length: 212.2 in (5,390 mm)
- Width: 70.9 in (1,800 mm)
- Height: 63.0 in (1,600 mm)

The Emgrand GE, formerly known as the Geely GE, is a three-seat full-size luxury concept car that was first unveiled at the Shanghai Motor Show in 2009. GE originally appeared similar to the Rolls-Royce Phantom before being restyled in 2010 and rebadged as an Emgrand, Geely's luxury brand. Price was to be ranged between US$31,000 and $47,000 and was scheduled to be available to the Chinese market in 2014.
