= Emgrand EC8 =

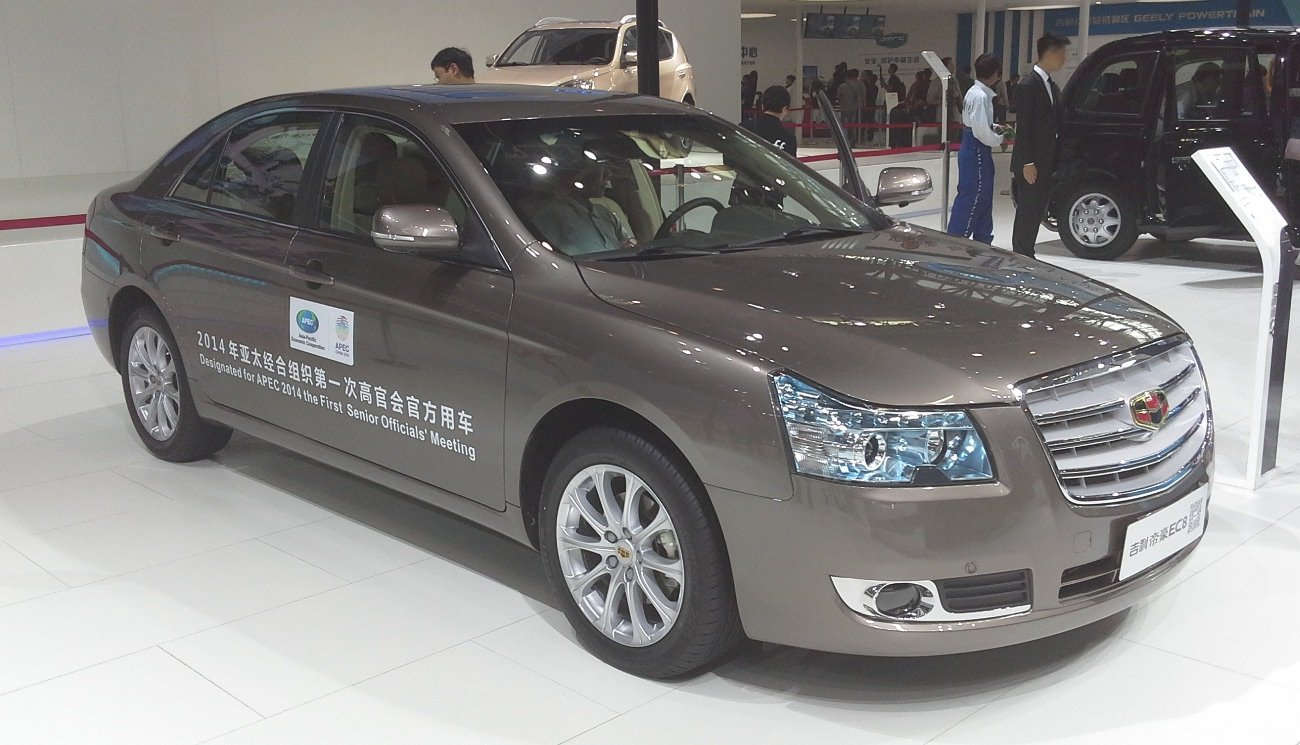

Overview
- Manufacturer: Emgrand (Geely Auto)
- Also called: Emgrand EC820
- Production: 2010–2014
- Model years: 2011–2015

Body and chassis
- Class: Compact executive car (D)
- Body style: 4-door sedan
- Layout: Front-engine, front-wheel-drive

Powertrain
- Engine: 2.0 L 4G63 I4 (petrol); 2.0 L GeTec I4 (petrol); 2.4 L 4G69 I4 (petrol); 2.4 L GeTec I4 (petrol)
- Transmission: 5-speed manual; 6-speed automatic

Dimensions
- Wheelbase: 2,805 mm (110.4 in)
- Length: 4,905 mm (193.1 in)
- Width: 1,830 mm (72.0 in)
- Height: 1,495 mm (58.9 in)
- Curb weight: 1,490–1,545 kg (3,285–3,406 lb)

Chronology
- Successor: Geely Borui

The Emgrand EC8 is a large family car of the Emgrand sub-brand of Chinese automaker Geely Auto.

== Background ==
The Emgrand EC8 debuted at the 2010 Beijing Auto Show. Formerly known as the Emgrand EC825, Geely decided to shorten the name to simply Emgrand EC8.

The EC8 is Geely's first entry to the D-segment mid-size sedan or Large family car market. The car resembles a cross between the Toyota Camry (XV40) and the Cadillac CTS as the EC8 was benchmarked against and reverse engineered from the Toyota Camry. The Geely EC8 will compete with mid-size rivals such as the Toyota Camry, Volkswagen Magotan, Honda Accord, Nissan Teana and Chery-Riich G5 in the Chinese market.

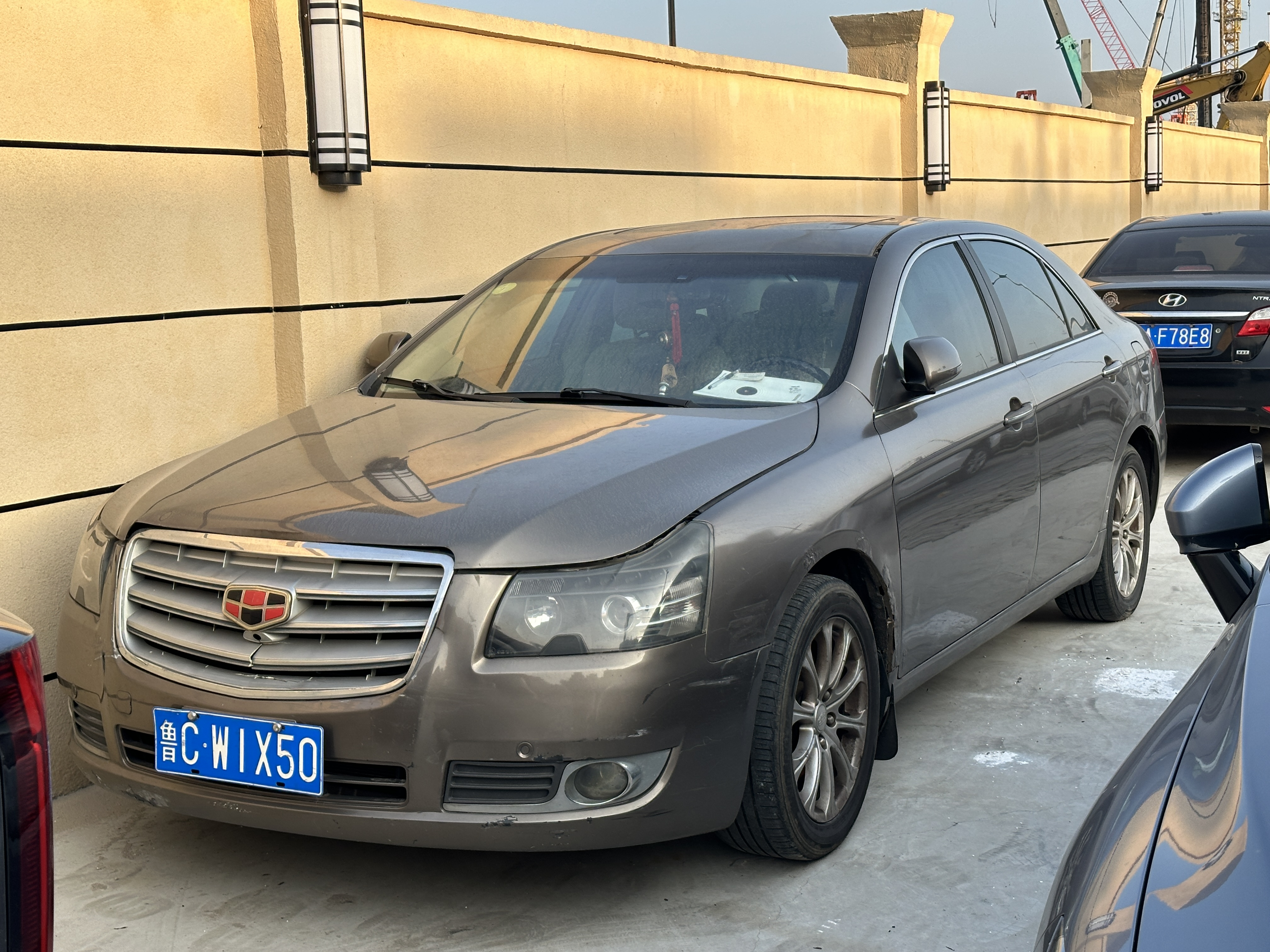
Emgrand EC8 front

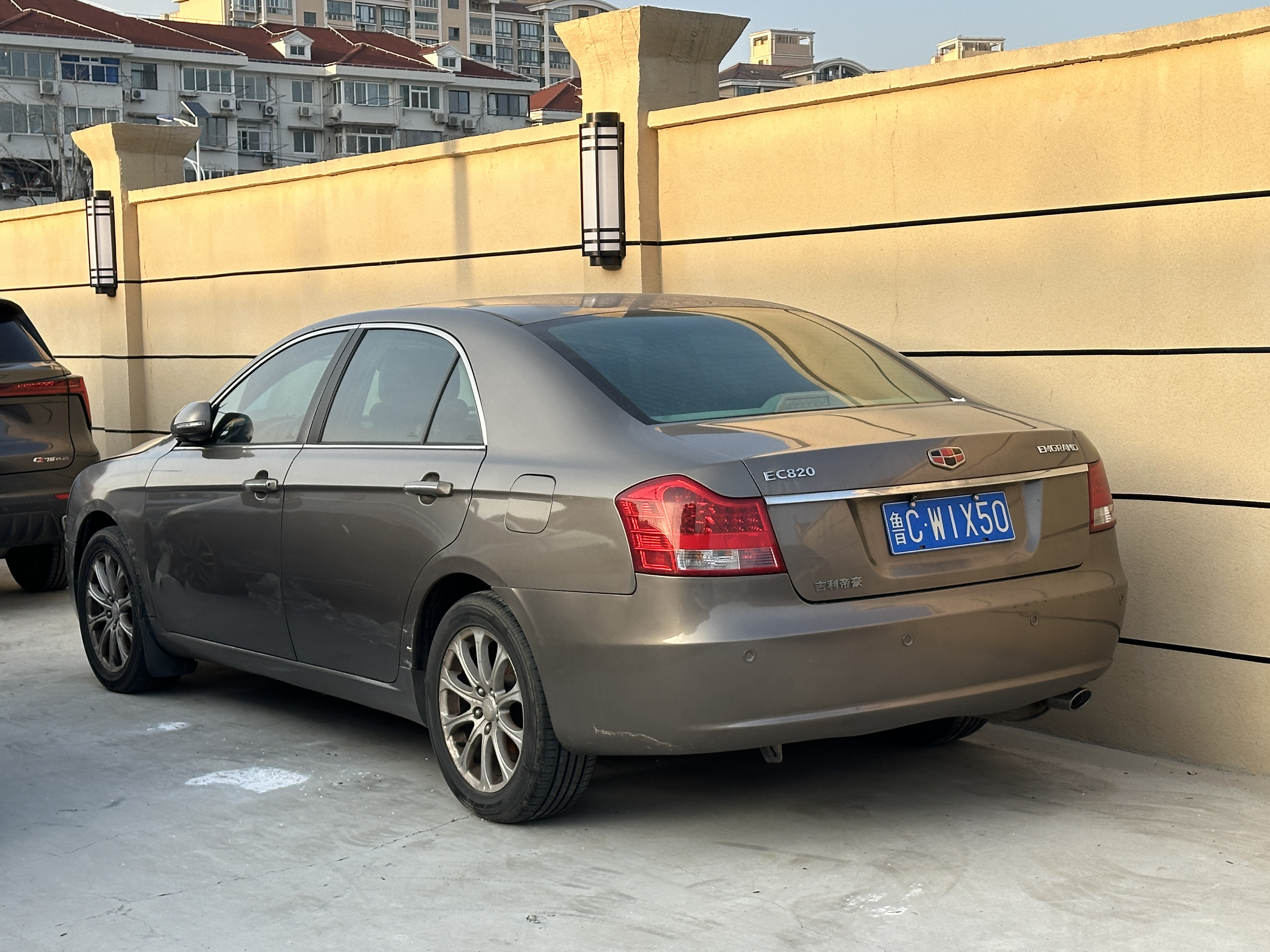
Emgrand EC8 rear

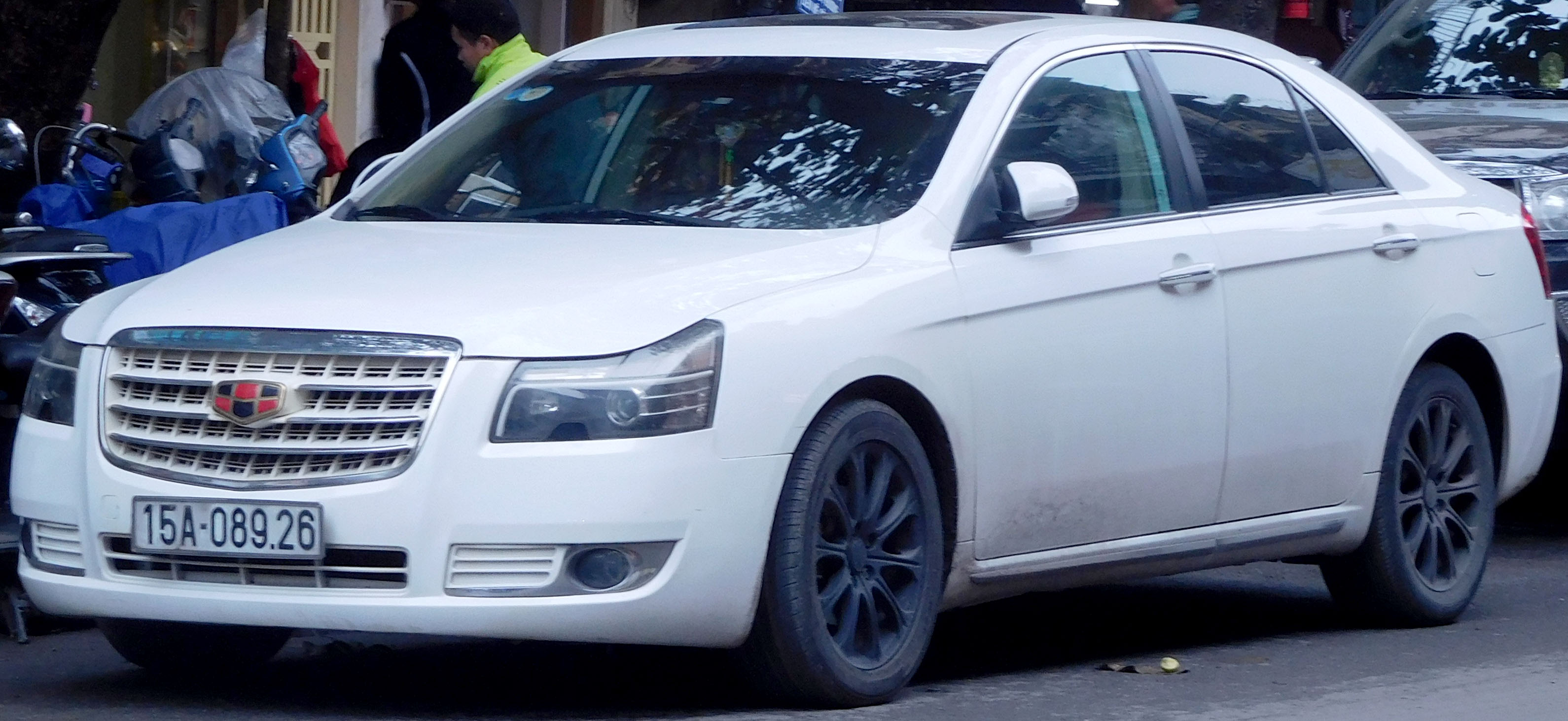
Emgrand EC8 front in Vietnam

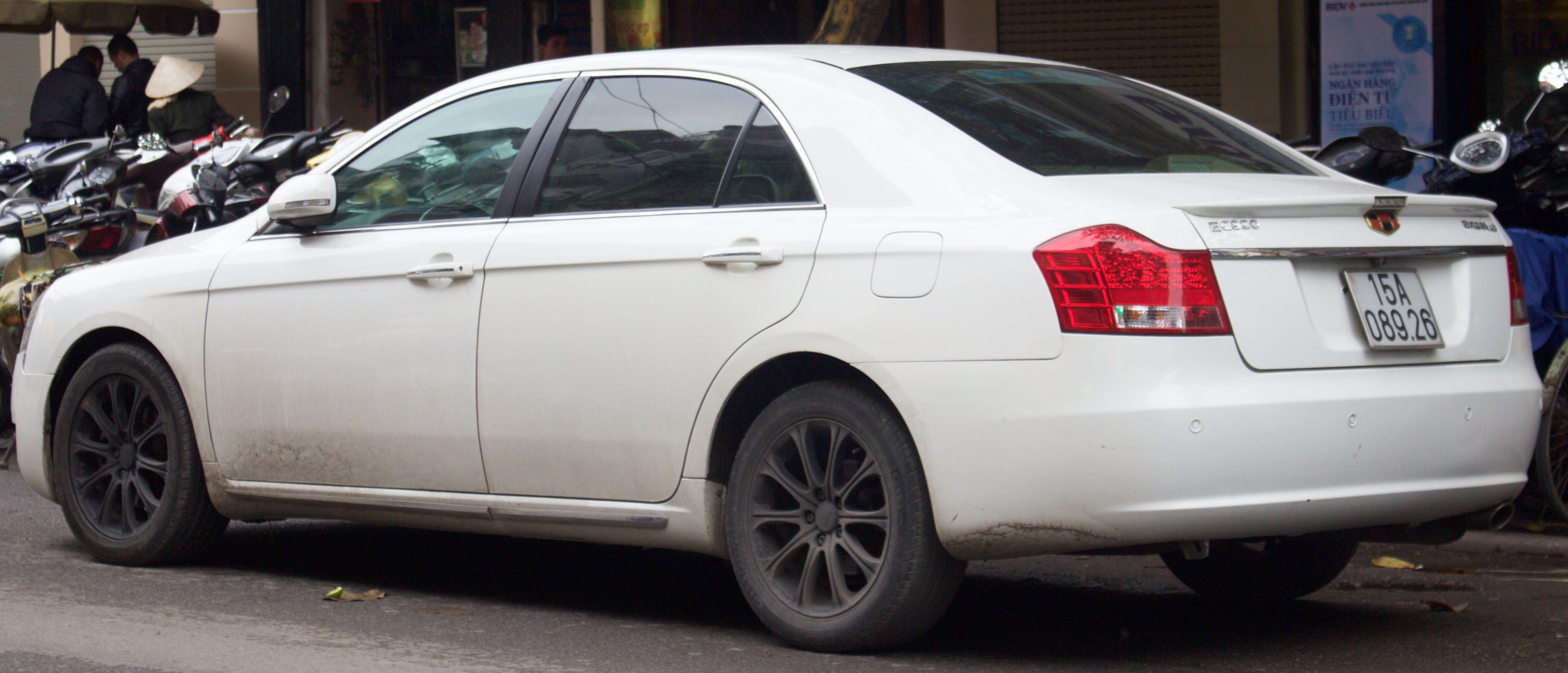
Emgrand EC8 rear in Vietnam
