= Geely Borui GE =

Mid-size sedan

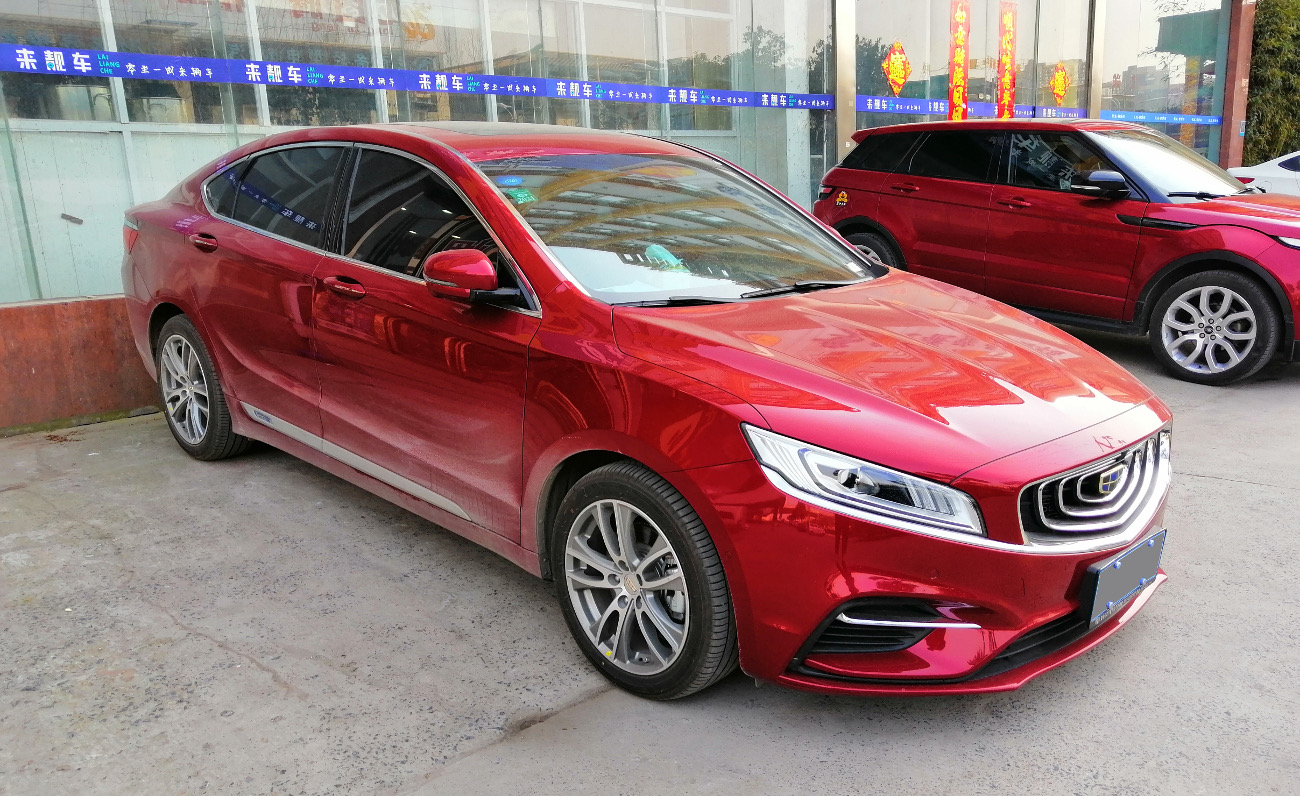
- Geely Borui GE (pre-facelift)

Overview
- Manufacturer: Geely Auto
- Also called: Geely Borui GT
- Production: 2018–2022
- Model years: 2018–2022
- Designer: Peter Horbury

Body and chassis
- Class: Large family car/Mid-size car (D)
- Body style: 4-door fastback sedan
- Layout: FF layout
- Platform: Geely KC2
- Related: Geely Borui

Powertrain
- Engine: 1.5 L turbo direct injection petrol 190 hp (142 kW; 193 PS) (MHEV); 1.5 L turbo direct injection petrol 257 hp (192 kW; 261 PS) (PHEV)
- Electric motor: 10 kW (13 hp; 14 PS) Geely P0 48V BSG Intelligent Mild Hybrid System (MHEV); 60 kW (80 hp; 82 PS) Permanent Magnet Synchronous Motors (PHEV)
- Transmission: 7-speed 7DCT DCT; 7-speed 7DCTH DCT (Borui GE PHEV)
- Hybrid drivetrain: Mild Hybrid (Borui GE MHEV); PHEV (Borui GE PHEV)
- Battery: 11.3 kWh Li-ion

Dimensions
- Wheelbase: 2,870 mm (113.0 in)
- Length: 4,986 mm (196.3 in)
- Width: 1,861 mm (73.3 in)
- Height: 1,513 mm (59.6 in)
- Kerb weight: 1,600–1,660 kg (3,530–3,660 lb)

Chronology
- Predecessor: Geely Borui
- Successor: Geely Galaxy Starshine 8

The Geely Borui, marketed as the Geely Borui GE (Chinese: 吉利博瑞GE; pinyin: Jílì Bóruì GE) until 2020, is a mid-sized sedan that was produced by the Chinese automaker Geely from 2018 to 2021. Mild hybrid and plug-in hybrid forms were also provided. The model was unveiled in March 2018, and went on sale on May 28 the same year.

== Naming ==
The "GE" in Borui GE possibly stands for grand evolution, genius efficient or Geely elite.

== Overview ==
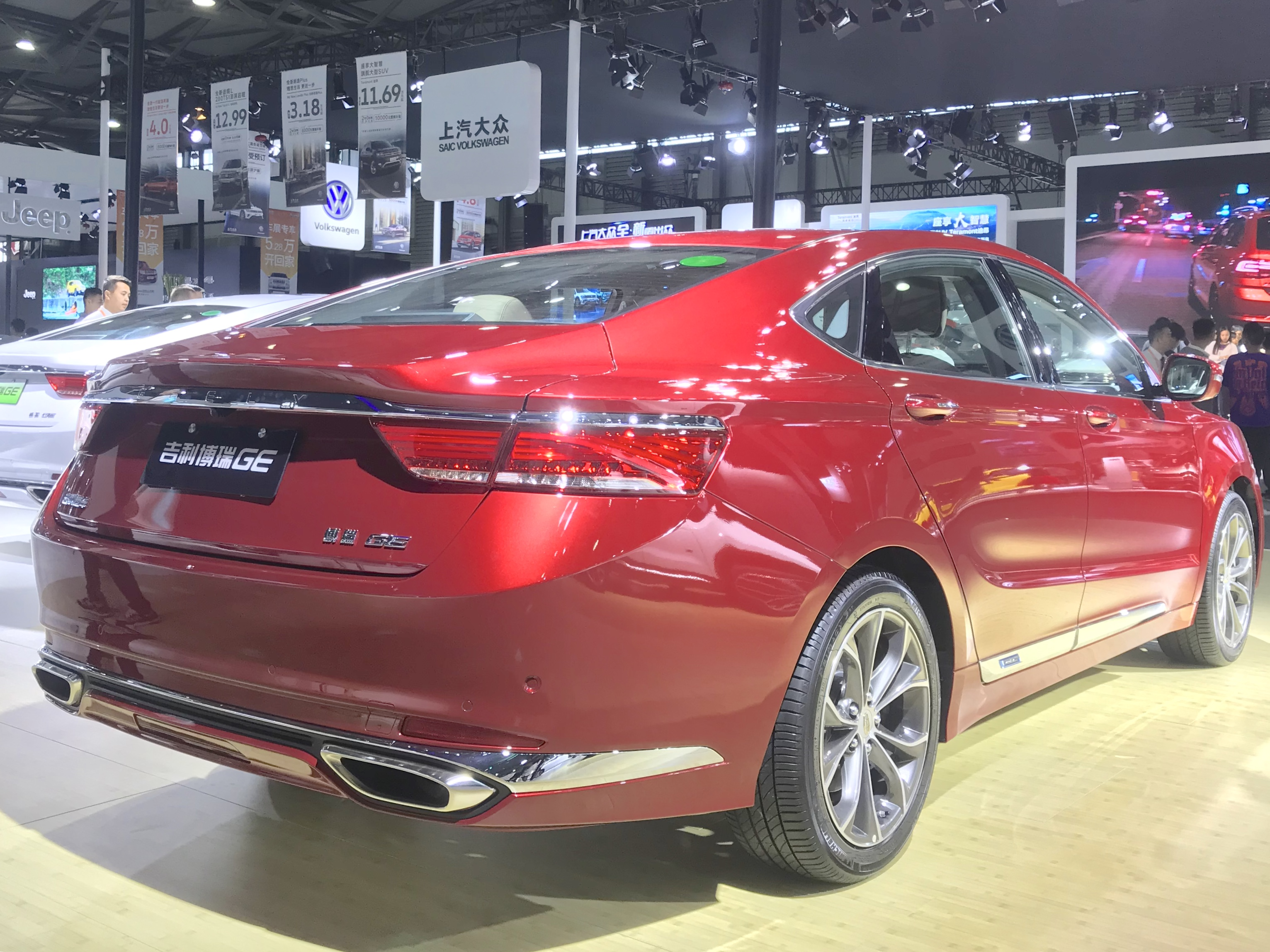
Rear view (pre-facelift)

In late 2017 Geely unveiled a flagship hybrid fastback car 'K Model' (later renamed Geely Borui GT) based on the Geely Borui. It was later renamed as the "Geely Borui GE". On 10 March 2018, the Chinese automaker Geely organized an activity of design interpretation and static shot of the new Borui GE in Suzhou, Jiangsu. it was the first shown of Geely Borui GE. In 2018 Beijing Auto Show, a month and a half after the event in Suzhou, the Borui GE featured in the important areas of the booths.

The Geely Borui GE multimedia system provides touchscreen and has the ability to activate and control all systems in the car. The main screen takes some ideas from a cellphone. In plug-in models, there's also a key which infers users the electric vehicle settings.

The Borui GE featured a full LED light system and a 7-speed dual-clutch gearbox co-developed by Geely and Volvo with an electronic gearknob. The liquid crystal dashboard, electronic handbrake, automatic parking, ACC system, seat heating and ventilation, electric boost, knee airbag and remote start are available in most models.

=== Technical specifications ===
	Mild Hybrid	Plug-in Hybrid
Engines	1.5T 180 hp petrol	1.5T 180 hp petrol
Maximum power output	132 kW (177 hp; 179 PS) at 5,500 rpm	132 kW (177 hp; 179 PS) at 5,500 rpm
Peak torque	265 N⋅m (195 lb⋅ft; 27 kg⋅m) at 1,500-4,000	265 N⋅m (195 lb⋅ft; 27 kg⋅m) at 1,500-4,000 rpm
Electric motor power	10 kW (13 hp; 14 PS)	60 kW (80 hp; 82 PS)
Electric motor torque	35 N⋅m (26 lb⋅ft; 4 kg⋅m)	
Combined power	142 kW (190 hp; 193 PS)	192 kW (257 hp; 261 PS)
Combined torque	300 N⋅m (221 lb⋅ft; 31 kg⋅m)	425 N⋅m (313 lb⋅ft; 43 kg⋅m)

=== Plug-in hybrid version ===
The PHEV version featured an 11.5 kWh (41 MJ) ternary lithium battery provided by Ningde Century which supports power from charging piles outputs 6.6 kW or 3.3 kW and 220V household. When using 6.6 kW charging piles, the model needs only 1.5 hours to finish charging and would able to cruise 60 kilometres (37 mi) or more without petrol. The battery uses "T segment" and a Geely "P2.5 system". The transmission carries a 1.5TD petrol engine and a 7-speed DCT gearbox. The peak torque of plug in version reaches 425 N⋅m (313 lb⋅ft; 43 kg⋅m).

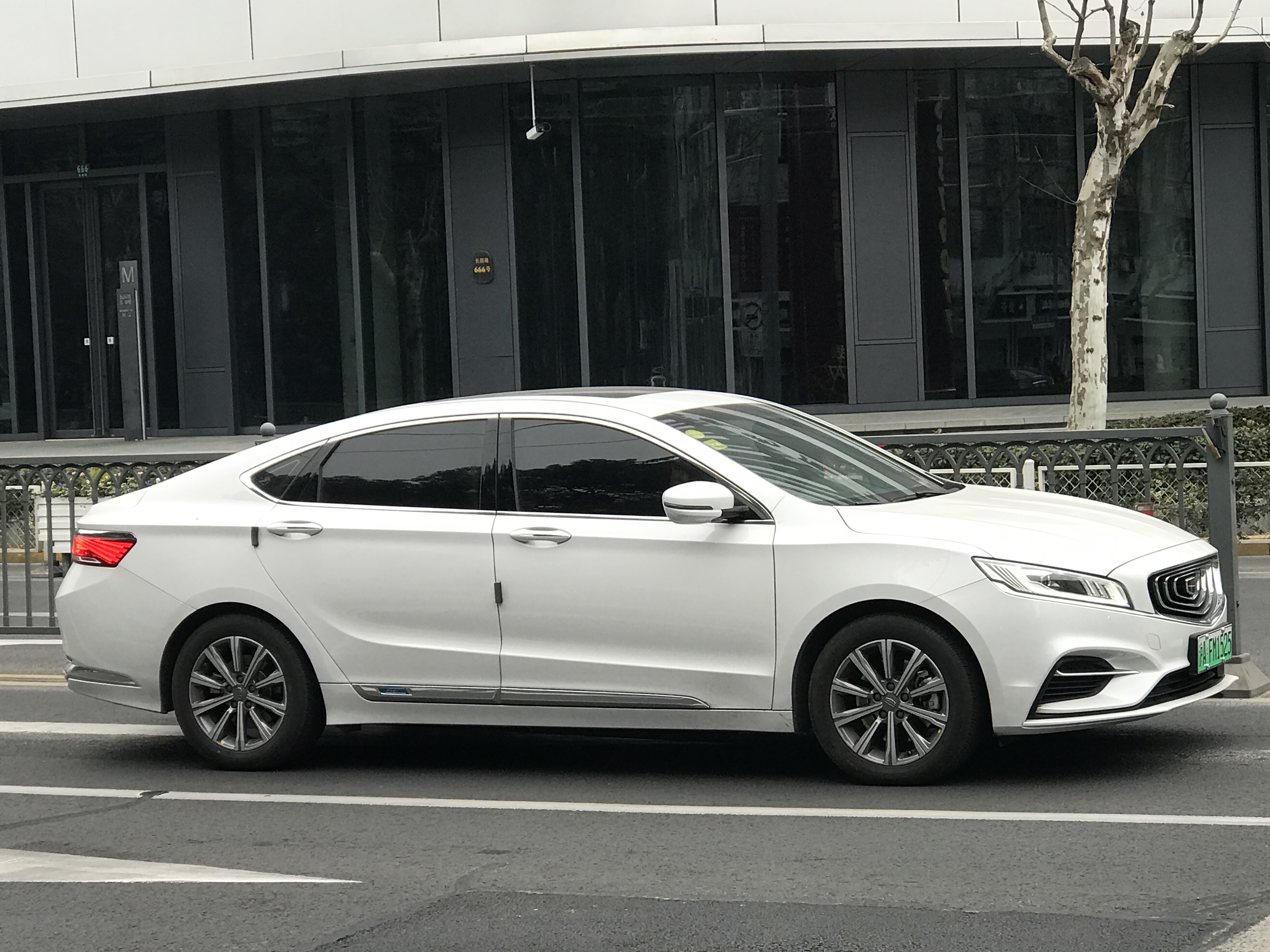
Geeely Borui GE PHEV

==== Geely P2.5 Hybrid Drive System ====
Most European automakers use a hybrid system called P2, which means the electric power lies between the engine and the gearbox. However, Geely Borui GE puts its electric power on its dual-clutch gearbox. The e-machine is connected with one of the two clutches by an input shaft. The defect is that the clutch of even numbers would carry more mechanical abrasion.

=== Mild hybrid version ===
Borui GE MHEV uses a 1.5T L3 petrol engine and carries a Geely P0 electric motor. The Borui GE P0 electric motor only provides a small battery and does not support pure electric drive. In fact the battery is only helping the three cylinder engine and the dual clutch transmission for fuel saving. Fuel economy numbers are rated at 5.8 L/100 km (49 mpg_{‑imp}; 41 mpg_{‑US}) and power outputs for the MHEV are 190 hp (142 kW; 193 PS) and 300 N⋅m (221 lb⋅ft; 31 kg⋅m) of torque.

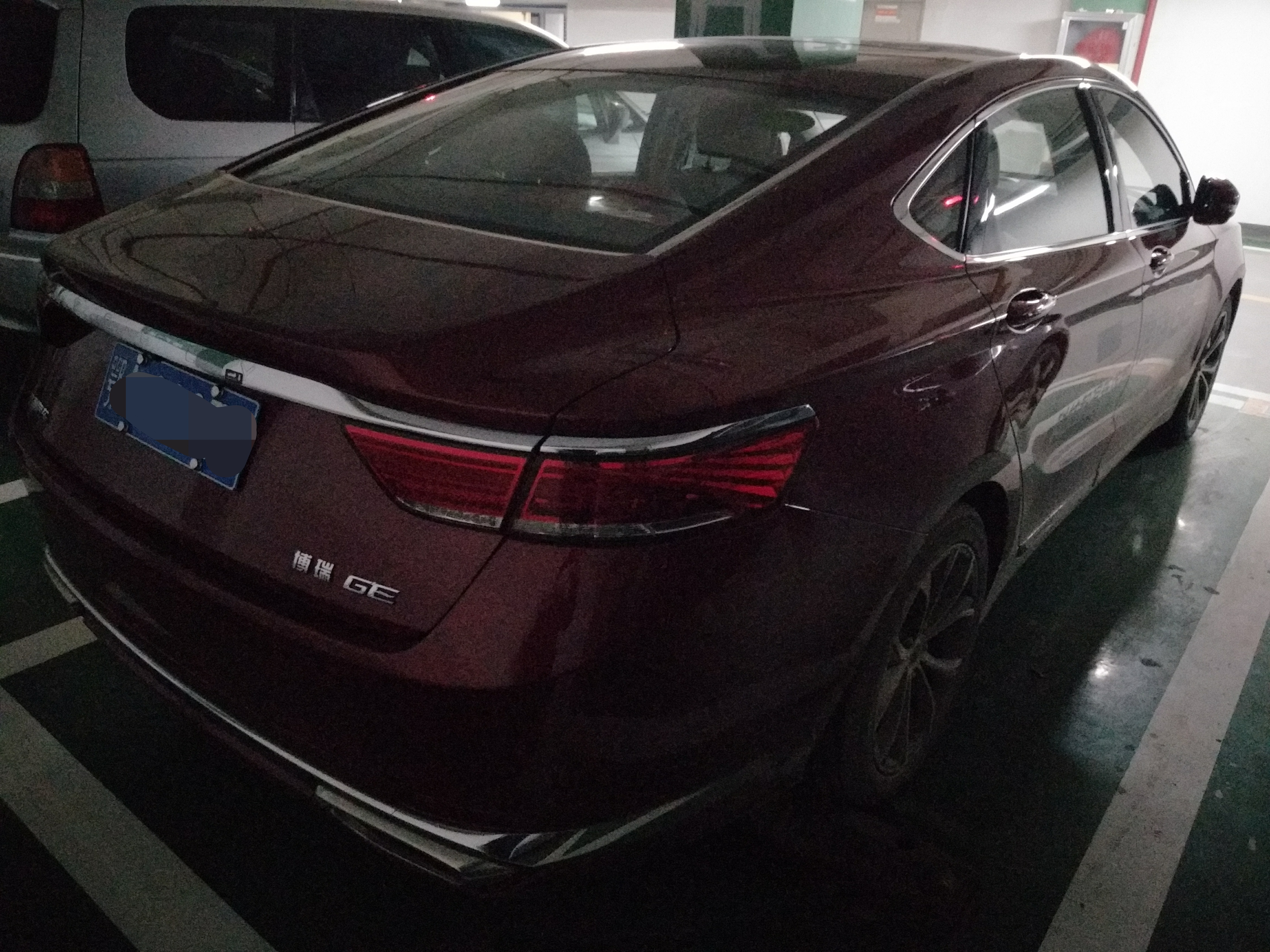
Geely Borui GE MHEV

=== Promotion event ===
Geely Auto had organised a driving activity on 10 May 2018, about three weeks before going on sale. The activity's main focus was the low of fuel consumption of Borui GE. The Beijing-Shanghai journey began on the morning and ended at midnight. This showed that each car used only a tank of petrol. The route was about 1,200 kilometres (750 mi), passing 44 cities. According to the trip computer, the average fuel consumption was 4.3 L/100 km (23.3 km/L; 65.7 mpg_{‑imp}; 54.7 mpg_{‑US}), and the lowest consumption was 3.7 L/100 km (27.0 km/L; 76.3 mpg_{‑imp}; 63.6 mpg_{‑US}), breaking the record low of hybrid B-segment car fuel consumption.

== Facelift (2020) ==
The Borui received a facelift in August 2020 with the GE name dropped. The facelift features a 1.8-litre turbo engine mated to a 7-speed DCT. The front end sports a redesigned front bumper and the new vertical grilles and black trims, and all chrome trims are now blacked out on the facelift model.

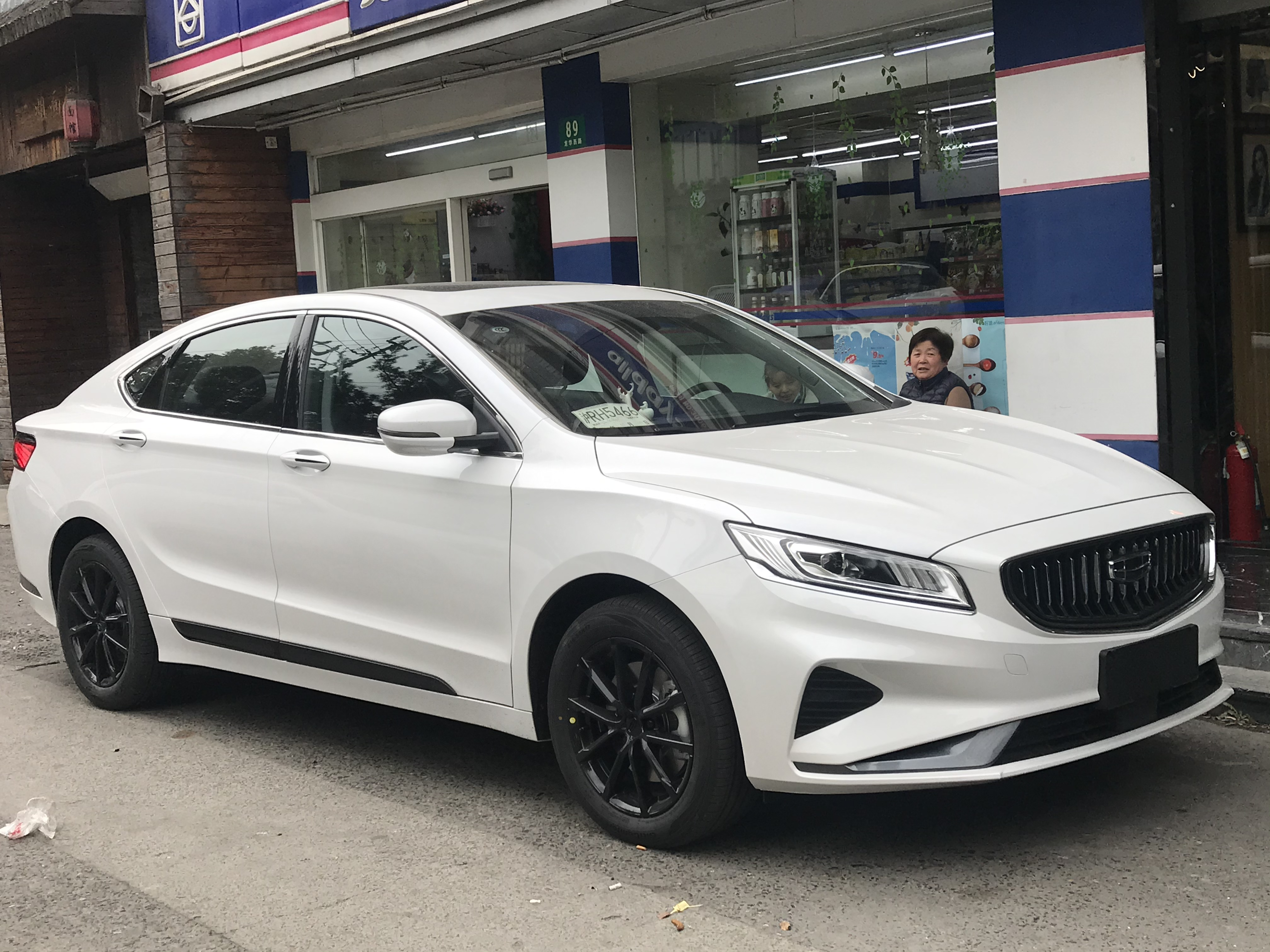
2020 Geely Borui

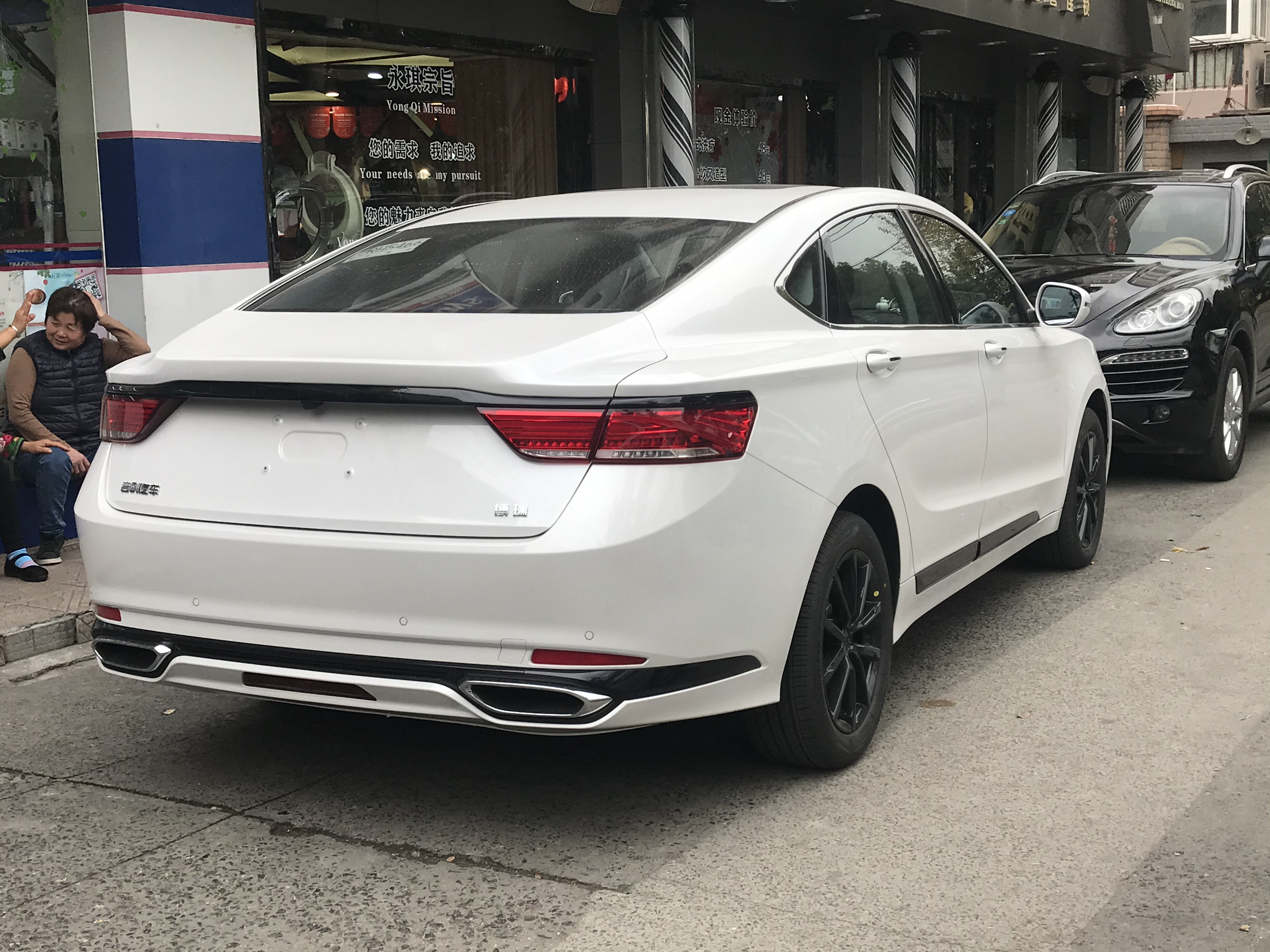
Rear view

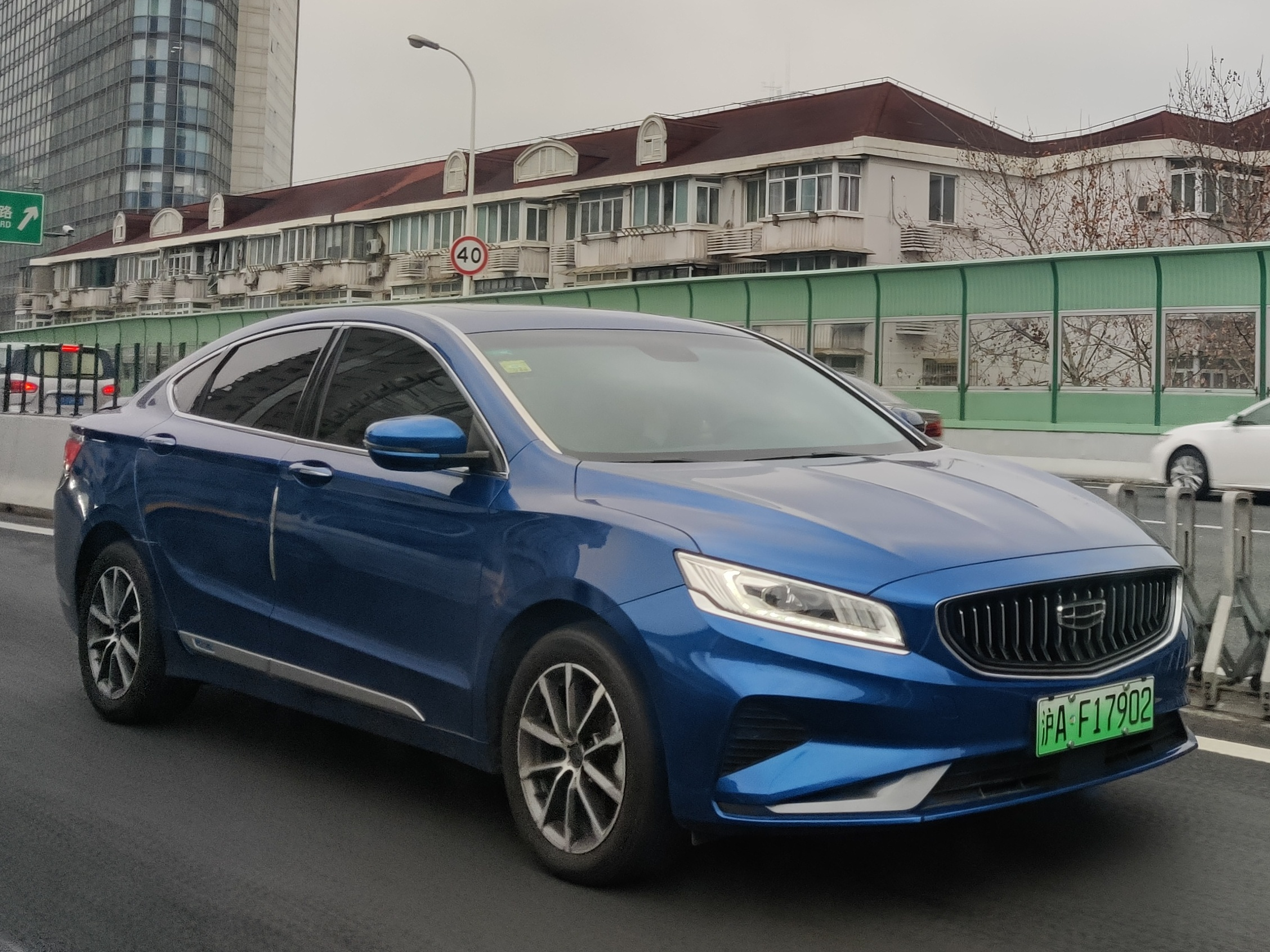
Geely Borui ePro

== Sales ==
As the Geely Borui GE went on sale, about 2,000 units of car was sold in the first hour. In 2018, 44,299 units were sold.
