= Geely Borui =

Mid-size sedan

Geely Borui (GC9)
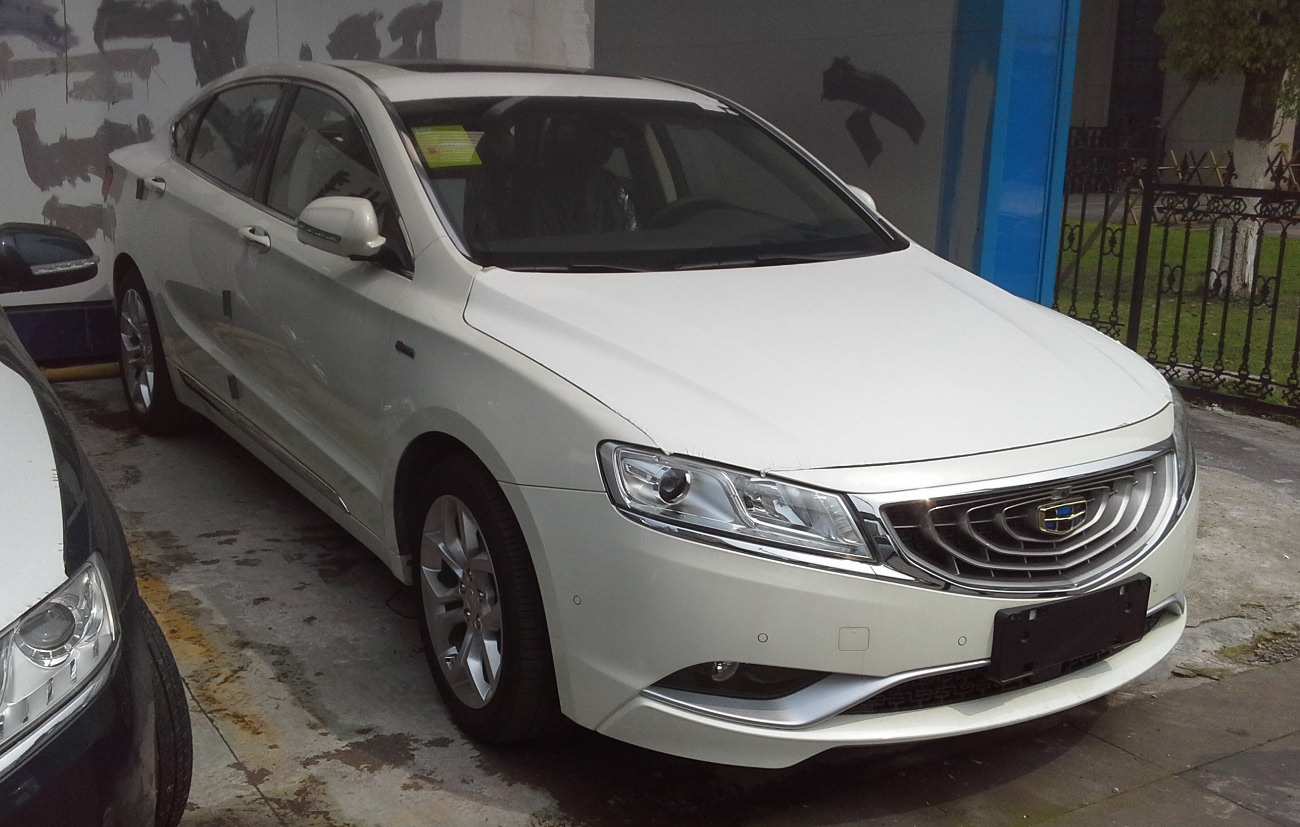

Overview
- Manufacturer: Geely Auto
- Also called: Geely Emgrand GT (Russia)
- Production: 2015–2022
- Designer: Peter Horbury, Steve Harper

Body and chassis
- Class: Large family car/Mid-size car (D)
- Body style: 4-door fastback sedan
- Layout: Front-engine, front-wheel-drive
- Platform: Geely KC Platform
- Related: Geely Borui GE

Powertrain
- Engine: Petrol: 1.8 L JLE-4G18TD turbo I4; 2.4 L JLD-4G24 I4; 3.5 L JLV-6G35V V6
- Transmission: 6-speed automatic 7-speed DCT

Dimensions
- Wheelbase: 2,850 mm (112.2 in)
- Length: 4,956 mm (195.1 in)
- Width: 1,861 mm (73.3 in)
- Height: 1,513 mm (59.6 in)
- Curb weight: 1,635–1,780 kg (3,605–3,924 lb)

Chronology
- Predecessor: Emgrand EC8
- Successor: Geely Borui GE

The Geely Borui (Chinese: 吉利博瑞; pinyin: Jílì Bóruì) is a large family car/mid-size car (D-segment in Europe) produced by the Chinese automaker Geely Auto from April 2015 to 2022.

== History ==
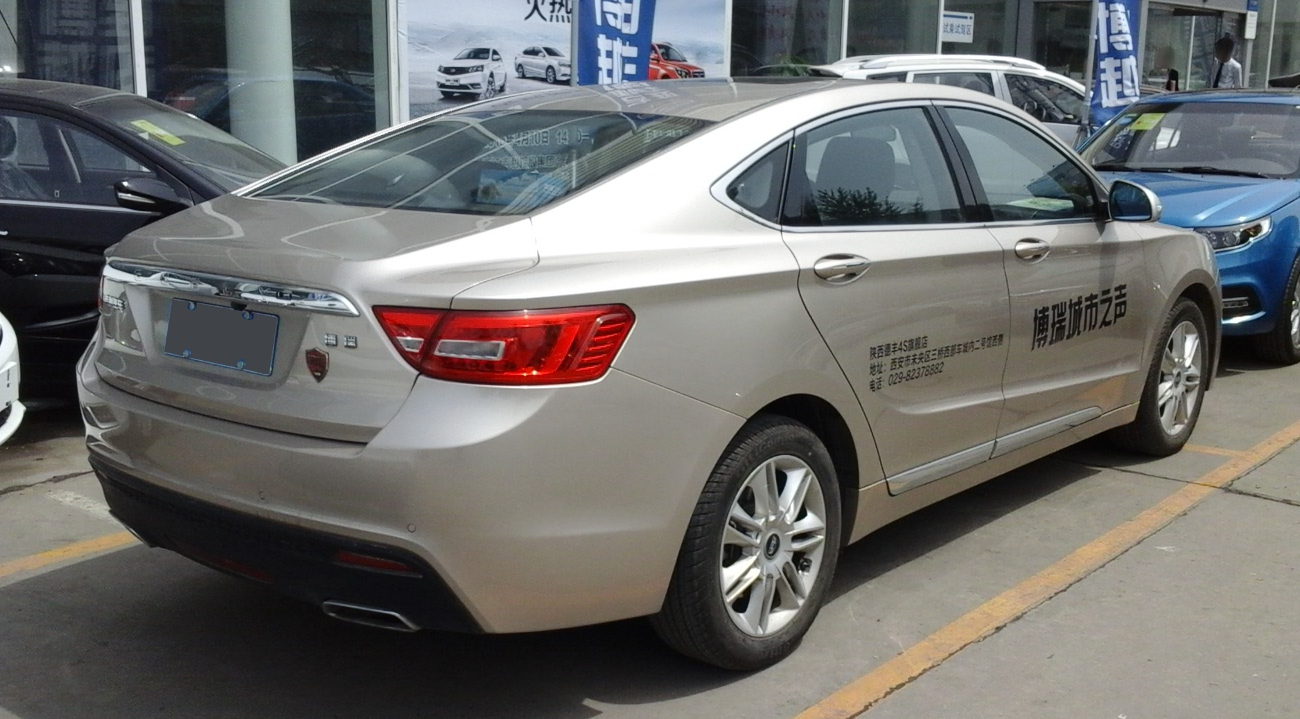
Geely Borui rear

At the 2011 Shanghai Motor Show, Volvo unveiled the Concept Universe. However, that concept was cancelled after Peter Horbury left Volvo as he joined Geely as vice president of design in 2012. The Geely KC concept was unveiled in April 2013 at the Shanghai Auto Show; the designers already started off the project 2 years ago in 2011. The design of the Borui is based on the KC Concept unveiled at the 2013 Shanghai Auto Show; Peter took the idea of the ripple intake grille and the fastback style from the Concept Universe for the KC Concept. During the 2018 Beijing Auto Show, the facelifted Geely Borui was revealed with the sportier Geely Borui GE model.

== Development ==
In mid-2014, the KC concept was confirmed for production as the GC9; the model was later renamed Borui. The car was developed from a new platform jointly developed with Volvo. The Borui is a fastback, which is an uncommon design in the Chinese automobile market. The Borui was the first car model showing what Peter Horbury, the vice president of design for Geely's idea of "Future Geely": Uncommon ripple intake grille, sportive and retro. Peter thinks that a car should look active, since it is not something like a furniture.

== Technology ==
The interior is mostly chrome plated. Orange decorating LED light strip and ACC (Autonomous cruise control system) were available. It is equipped with double wishbone suspension tuned by automotive technology company Prodrive. The Borui engine options include a 1.8T GDI engine and 3.5L V6 aluminum engine, as well as a six-speed direct shift gearbox provided by Australian transmission producer DSI, which was acquired by Geely in 2009.

=== Engines ===
2015: 1.8T 163hp L4 petrol, 2.4L 162hp L4 petrol, 3.5L 275hp V6 petrol
2016: 1.8T 163hp L4 petrol, 2.4L 162hp L4 petrol
2017: 1.8T 184hp L4 petrol, 2.4L 162hp L4 Petrol
2018: 1.8T 184hp L4 petrol

=== Facelift ===
The Borui facelifted model had minor changes to the exterior. The only thing had changed outward is the intake grille. The facelifted Borui carries a Geely G-Power 1.8 Turbo Engine (petrol) which increased the power. The maximum power output reached 135 kW (181 hp) and the peak torque reaches 300 N⋅m (221 lbf⋅ft). Geely official said the 0-100 km/h (0-62 mph) acceleration of New Borui takes 9.5 seconds. Additionally, the facelifted Geely improved the energy output but had reduced fuel consumption by 4.8 percent. The chassis adjustment had access to resources from Volvo and Lean Nova and switched 46 of the bushings, together with 8 of the pads. The braking system was also switched which shortened the braking distance. The official 100-0 km/h (62-0 mph) braking distance was cut down to 37.14 metres.

	2016 Geely Borui	2018 Geely Borui
Max Power Output	120 kW (161 hp)	135 kW (181 hp)
Peak Torque	250 N⋅m (184 lbf⋅ft)	300 N⋅m (221 lbf⋅ft)
Engine	1.8T/2.4L 163/162hp L4	1.8/2.4L 184/162hp L4
Average Fuel Consumption	7.8L/100km	8.2L/100km

=== Variants ===
The Geely Borui GE is Geely's flagship hybrid large family car based on Geely CMA platform and made its first appearance in March 2018 and went on sale in May 2018. It carries a 1.5T 180hp L3 petrol engine and a 7-speed DCT gearbox for both mild hybrid version and plug in hybrid version.

== Awards ==
The Borui received 5 stars in C-NCAP crash testing.
