= LEVC L380 =

Battery electric minivan

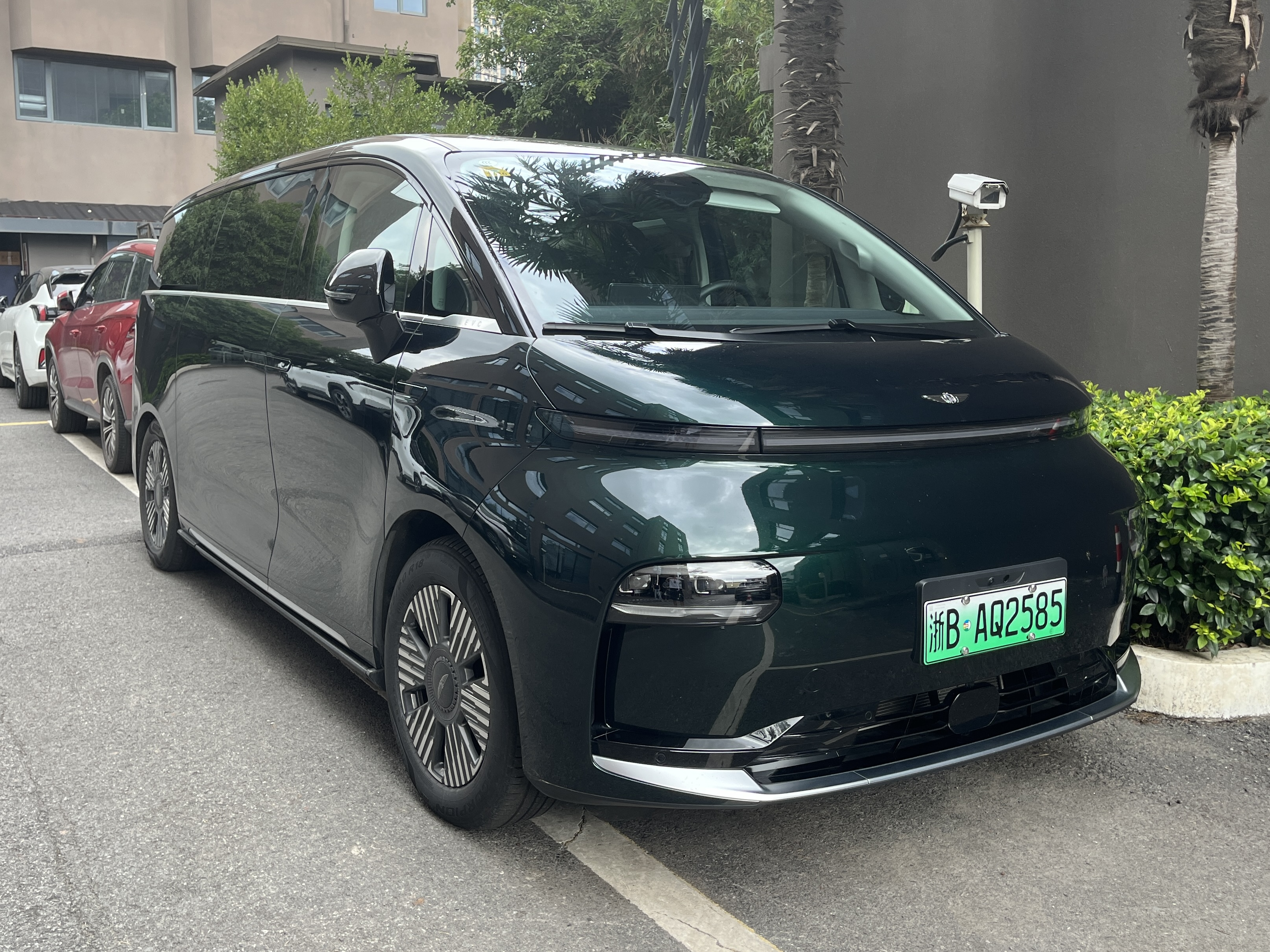

Overview
- Manufacturer: LEVC
- Model code: XE08
- Also called: Geely Galaxy LEVC L380 (China, 2025–present); Geely Galaxy V900 (China, EREV)
- Production: 2024–present
- Assembly: China: Yiwu, Zhejiang
- Designer: Brett Boydell

Body and chassis
- Class: Large minivan
- Body style: 5-door minivan
- Layout: EV: Front-motor, front-wheel-drive; Dual-motor, four-wheel-drive; EREV: Front-engine, dual-motor, four-wheel-drive
- Platform: LEVC L380: Space Oriented Architecture; Geely Galaxy V900: Global Energy Architecture Evo
- Related: Global Energy Architecture Evo: Smart #5 EHD; Smart #6; Geely Galaxy Starshine 8; Lynk & Co 10; Geely Galaxy M9

Powertrain
- Engine: 1.5 L BHE15-CFZ Turbo I4 (EREV)
- Electric motor: Permanent magnet synchronous
- Power output: 200–400 kW (270–540 hp; 270–540 PS) (EV); 340 kW (460 hp; 460 PS) (EREV)
- Hybrid drivetrain: Series (EREV)
- Battery: 43.3 kWh CALB NMC; 50 kWh CATL NMC; 100 kWh NMC; 116 kWh NMC; 140 kWh Qilin 3.0 NMC CATL
- Electric range: 570–825 km (354–513 mi)

Dimensions
- Wheelbase: 3,185 mm (125.4 in); 3,200 mm (126.0 in) (Geely Galaxy V900)
- Length: 5,318 mm (209.4 in); 5,360 mm (211.0 in) (Geely Galaxy V900)
- Width: 1,998 mm (78.7 in)
- Height: 1,940 mm (76.4 in)
- Kerb weight: 2,805 kg (6,184 lb)

The LEVC L380 is a battery electric minivan produced by electric vehicle manufacturer London EV Company for the Chinese and British car markets. The vehicle was renamed to Geely Galaxy LEVC L380 (Chinese: 吉利银河翼真L380; pinyin: Jílì Yínhé Yìzhēn L380) in the Chinese market in February 2025 due to the consolidation of LEVC into the Geely Galaxy sales network. An EREV version is sold as the Geely Galaxy V900 (Chinese: 吉利银河V900; pinyin: Jílì Yínhé V900).

== Overview ==
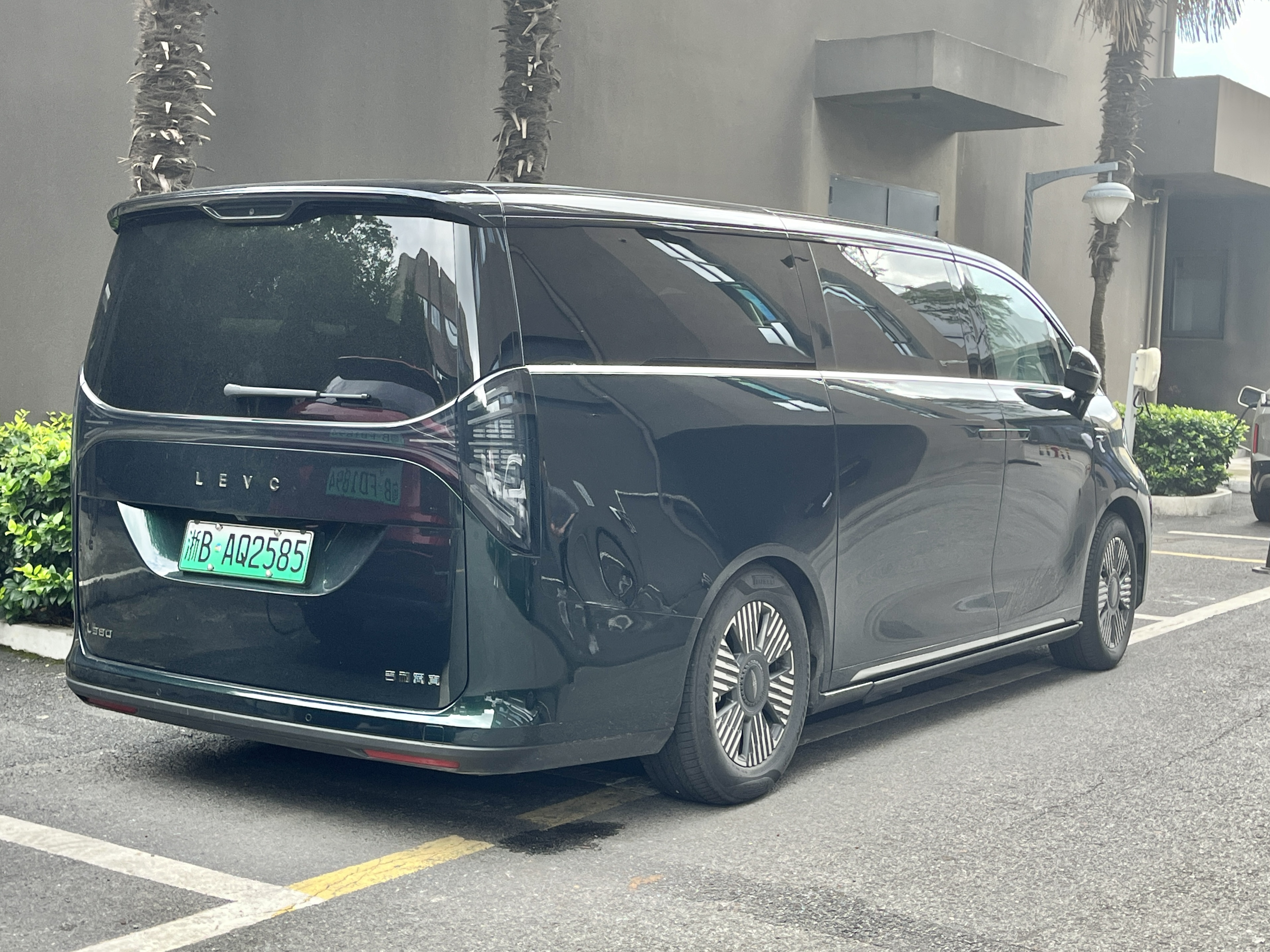
Rear view

Originally codenamed the LEVC XE08 and briefly named the Xspace before release, the L380 was first shown online in December 2023. It was launched on 25 June 2024 at an event in Wuzhen, China. In March 2025, the L380 was relaunched under the Geely Galaxy sales network with an accompanying price cut. It is expected to enter the UK market in 2026.

The name of the LEVC L380 is inspired by that of the Airbus A380 wide-body airliner, the world's largest passenger aircraft, to promote the model's spacious interior and comfort. Design cues of the minivan are also inspired by the fuselage of the plane. The exterior features a floating roof design, pop-out door handles, and wheels inspired by the London Eye. It is available in Pearl White, Ink Jade Black, Sapphire Blue, and Emerald Green paint colours.

The L380 has continuous damping control suspension as standard, while higher end versions are equipped with air suspension, which LEVC says is the first in the world to be combined with a dual ball joint McPherson strut suspension.

The L380 is available in both 3-row, 6-seat and 4-row, 8-seat configurations, with the second and third rows equipped with captain's chairs with individual armrests. The front row contains a 10.25-inch digital instrument cluster, a digital rear-view mirror, and a 15.4-inch infotainment display running L-OS software on an eCarX Antora 1000 Pro SoC, which also handles ADAS functions. Thanks to a rail system built into the floor, all the seats behind the front row can be reconfigured by the user, allowing for centrally located seats, rearward facing seats, and configurations ranging from three to eight seats. The seats are upholstered in semi-aniline leather and all have heating and ventilation functions. The cabin features a 2.18 m^{2} (23.5 sq ft) panoramic sunroof, a 14-speaker Yamaha sound system, and eleven airbags including two 112-litre (4.0 cu ft) side curtain airbags.

== Geely Galaxy V900 ==
The Geely Galaxy V900 is the extended-range version of the all-electric L380. It accommodates up to eight passengers and can travel up to 202 km in BEV mode. The V900 adopts the design style of the electric L380 and features LEVC badges throughout its exterior. Under the bonnet, it is equipped with a 1.5-litre turbocharged petrol engine (BHE15-CFZ) that produces 120 kW (161 hp). The vehicle's maximum speed is 190 km/h. The base model of the Geely Galaxy V900 comes with a 43.3 kWh ternary NMC battery manufactured by CALB. Depending on the seating configuration, this version can achieve an electric range of 165 to 172 km. The top-tier MPV variant features a 50 kWh ternary NMC battery from CATL, offering an electric range of 195 to 202 km. When the battery is depleted, the V900 consumes 7 to 7.2 litres of fuel per 100 km. The curb weight of the Geely Galaxy V900 varies depending on the seating configuration. It ranges from 2,910 kg to 3,030 kg.

Geely Galaxy V900

Rear view

=== Guinness World Record ===
The Galaxy V900 set the world record for most people fit into a multi-purpose vehicle on 27 November 2025, when it managed to fit 42 female dancers. It was confirmed shortly after the V900's debut at Auto Guangzhou 2025 via a video shared by Geely that was posted as the V900 was getting closer to the model's sales launch.

== Specifications ==
The 5.3-metre (17 ft) long LEVC L380 is based on LEVC's Space Oriented Architecture platform for large vehicles codeveloped with Geely, part of the SEA platform family. The L380 is powered by 200 kW (270 hp; 270 PS) motors produced by Viridi E-Mobility Technology Co., in either single motor front-wheel drive or dual-motor all-wheel drive configurations, the latter of which is capable of accelerating from 0–100 km/h (62 mph) in 5.5 seconds. The L380 is available with a choice of three NMC battery packs: a 100 kWh unit only available with front-wheel drive providing 570 km (350 mi) of range, a 116 kWh only available with all-wheel drive providing 650 km (400 mi) of range, and a 140 kWh CATL Qilin 3.0 pack with an energy density of 200 Wh/kg providing a CLTC range rating of 805–825 kilometres (500–513 mi). The charging time of the battery to go from 10% capacity to 80% is 30 minutes, with it gaining 200 km (120 mi) of range in 10 minutes.

Battery	Power	Torque	Range	Top speed
100 kWh NMC	200 kW (270 hp; 270 PS)	343 N⋅m (253 lb⋅ft)	570 km (350 mi)	170 km/h (110 mph)
116 kWh NMC Graphite	400 kW (540 hp; 540 PS)	686 N⋅m (506 lb⋅ft)	650 km (400 mi)	170 km/h (110 mph)
140 kWh Qilin 3.0 NMC CATL	400 kW (540 hp; 540 PS)	686 N⋅m (506 lb⋅ft)	805 km (500 mi)	170 km/h (110 mph)
140 kWh Qilin 3.0 NMC CATL	200 kW (270 hp; 270 PS)	343 N⋅m (253 lb⋅ft)	825 km (513 mi)	170 km/h (110 mph)

== Safety ==
C-NCAP (2021) test results 2024 LEVC L380 116 kWh 6-seat Pro
Category		%
Overall:	5 /5 stars	90.0%
Occupant protection:		91.97%
Vulnerable road users:		73.75%
Active safety:		94.91%

== Sales ==
LEVC L380

Year	China
2024	1,503
2025	808

Geely Galaxy V900

Year	China
2025	243
