= Smart 6 =

Plug-in hybrid mid-size sedan

Smart #6
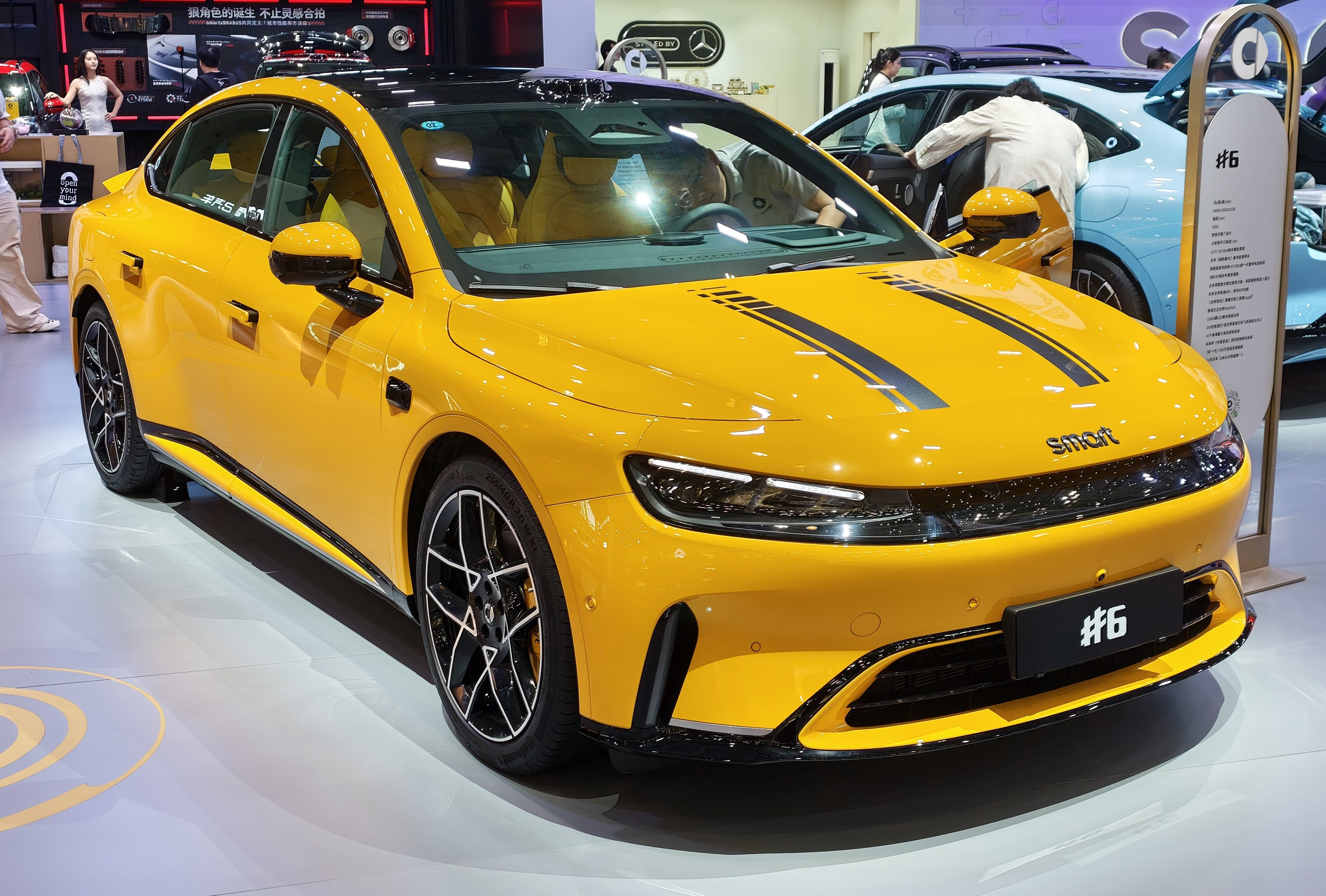

Overview
- Manufacturer: Smart Automobile
- Also called: Smart Jingling #6 (China)
- Production: 2026–present
- Assembly: China: Huzhou, Zhejiang

Body and chassis
- Class: Mid-size car (D)
- Body style: 5-door liftback
- Layout: Front-engine, front-motor, front-wheel-drive
- Platform: Global Energy Architecture Evo
- Related: Smart #5 EHD; Geely Galaxy Starshine 8; Lynk & Co 10; Geely Galaxy M9; Geely Galaxy V900

Powertrain
- Engine: Petrol plug-in hybrid: 1.5 L BHE15-CFZ turbocharged I4
- Power output: 429 hp (320 kW; 435 PS)
- Transmission: 3-speed DHT
- Battery: CATL or SVOLT LFP
- Range: 1,125 mi (1,811 km)

Dimensions
- Wheelbase: 2,926 mm (115.2 in)
- Length: 4,906 mm (193.1 in)
- Width: 1,922 mm (75.7 in)
- Height: 1,508 mm (59.4 in)
- Curb weight: 1,990–2,099 kg (4,387–4,628 lb)

The Smart #6 EHD (stylised in all lowercase) is a plug-in hybrid mid-size car developed and produced by Smart Automobile, a joint venture between Mercedes-Benz Group and Geely Holding.

== Overview ==
The #6 EHD was officially unveiled on 5 December 2025. It is Smart's largest model to date and is also the brand's first sedan. The #6 also uses Geely's NordThor Hybrid 2.0 plug-in hybrid system. Rumors of the Smart brand making a sedan began spreading in February 2025. This was confirmed in November 2025 when the first spyshots of the #6 surfaced on the internet. It is expected to rival the Tesla Model 3 and the seventh-generation BMW 3 Series plug-in hybrid.

The 4.91 meter length of the #6 EHD is comparable to the short-wheelbase version of the second-generation BMW 7 Series. It is also nearly as long as two of the 2.50m long first-generation ForTwos. Autoblog has described the design of the #6 as reminiscent of the Xiaomi SU7 without the "McLaren-style front fascia" of the SU7.

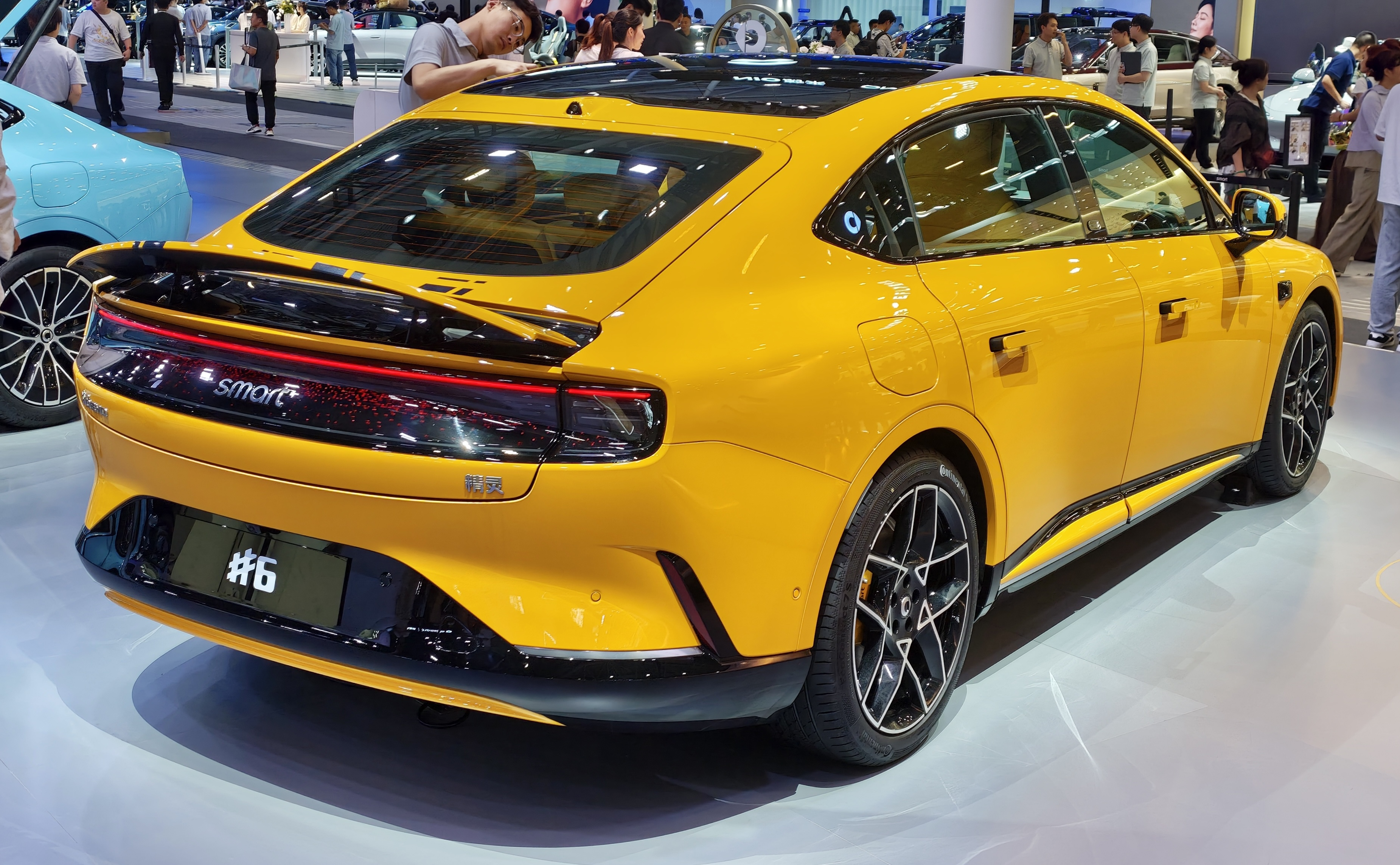
Rear view

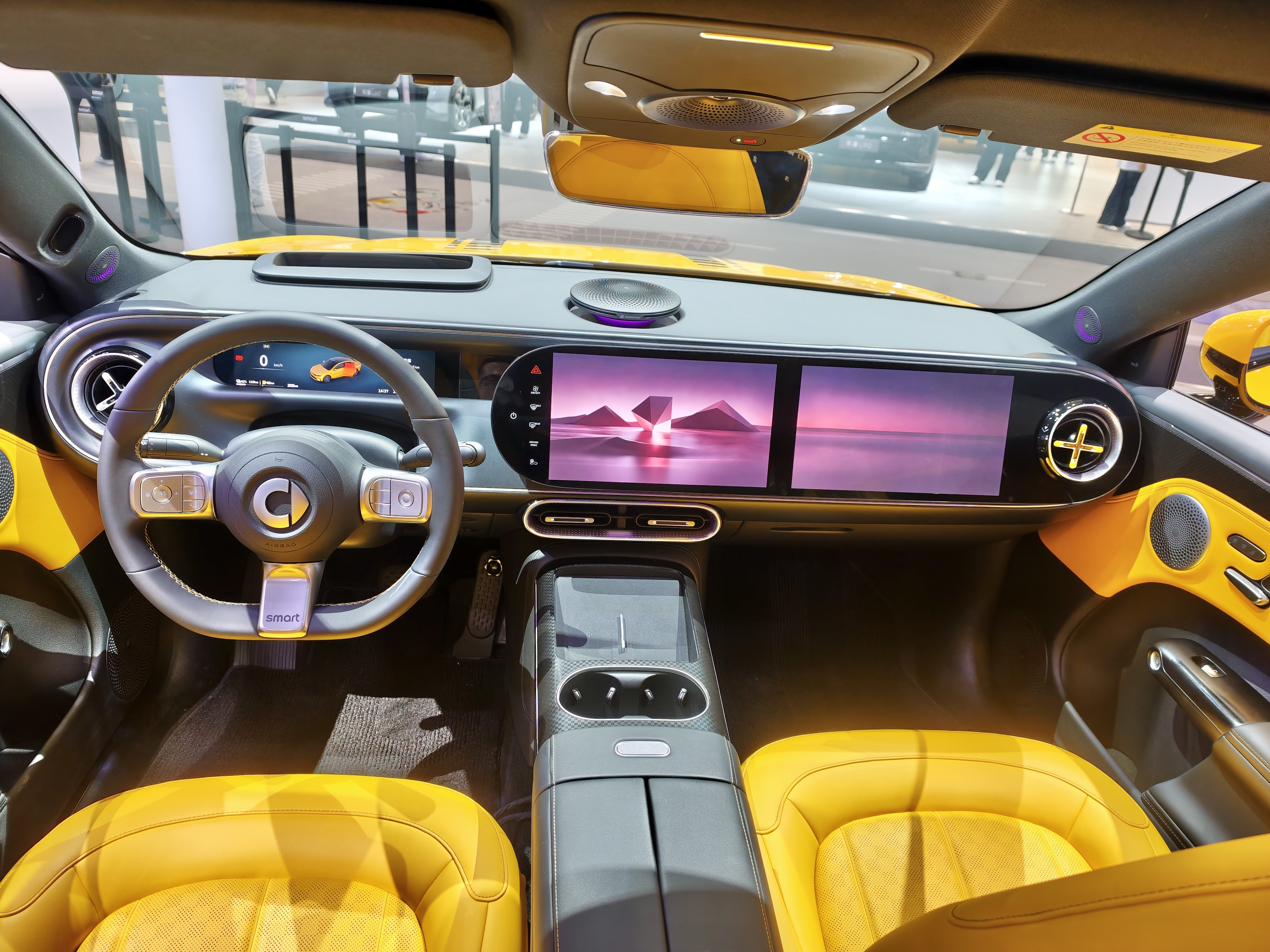
Interior

=== Design and features ===
A continuous light bar and small air intakes are present on the front of the #6. Multi-spoke rims and hidden door handles are present on the sides. The rear exhibits a wide stance. As with the front, a continuous light bar is also used at the back, this time using a more concave design. An optional rear wing is also present, and so is a LiDAR system. Multiple different headlight and taillight designs are expected to be offered, as are different brake calipers. 19 and 20-inch wheels will be offered, with tire sizes for both wheels being 255/45 and 255/40 respectively.

== Powertrain ==
The #6 uses Geely's aforementioned NordThor Hybrid 2.0 system, shared with models such as the Smart #5 and Geely Galaxy M9. It uses a 1.5 liter turbocharged inline 4 producing 161 horsepower and an electric motor producing 268 horsepower. The transmission is a 3-speed dedicated hybrid transmission. It has a pure electric range of 177 miles (285 km) and a combined range of 1,125 miles (1,811 km) and will be offered with lithium iron phosphate batteries produced by CATL or SVOLT.
