= Geely Galaxy TT =

Battery electric mid-size sedan

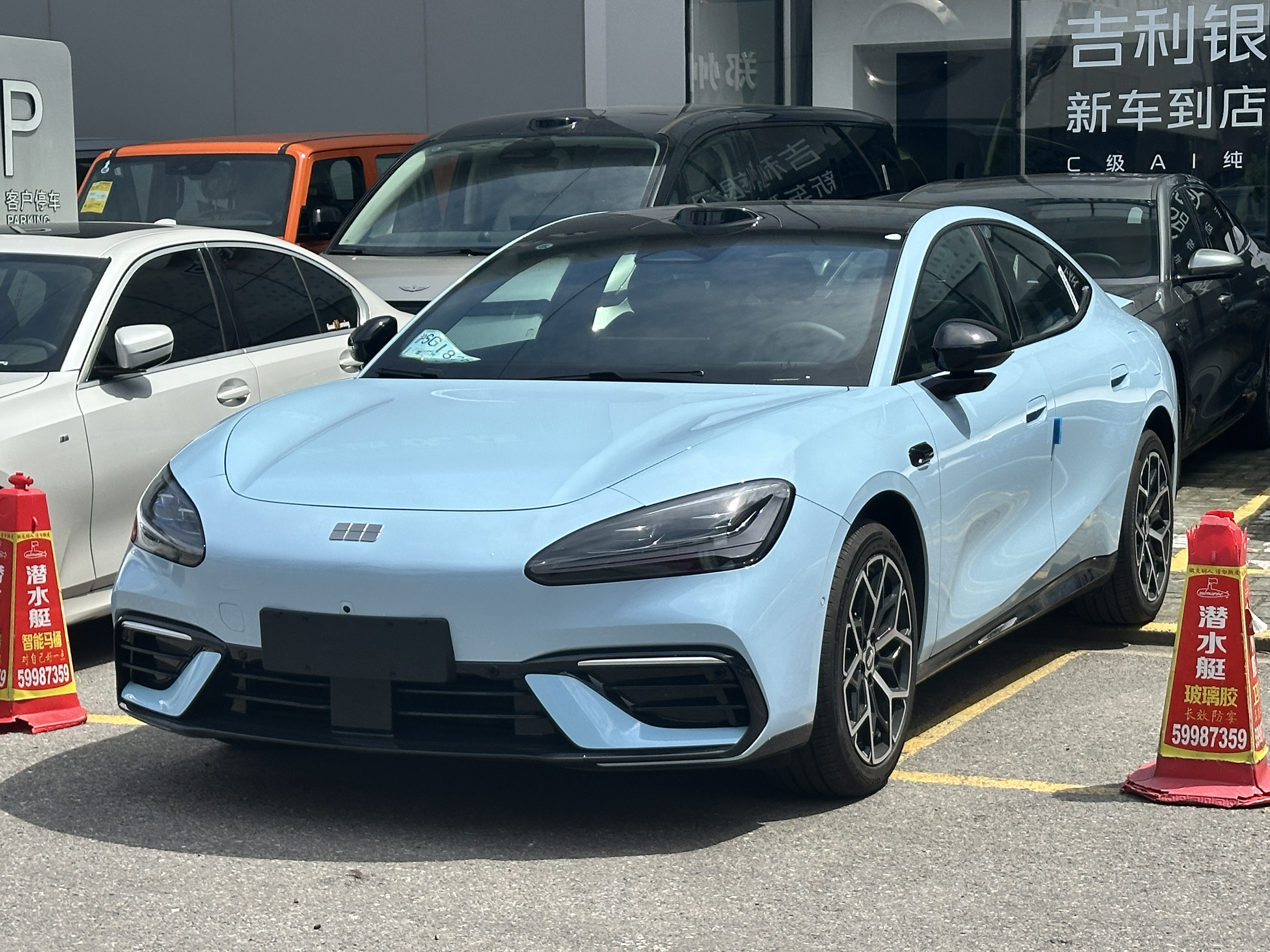

Overview
- Manufacturer: Geely Auto
- Production: 2026–present
- Assembly: China: Qiantang, Hangzhou

Body and chassis
- Class: Mid-size car (D)
- Body style: 4-door fastback sedan
- Layout: Rear-motor, rear-wheel drive; Dual-motor, all-wheel drive
- Platform: PMA2+ platform
- Related: Geely Galaxy E8; Geely Galaxy Starshine 8; Zeekr 007

Powertrain
- Electric motor: 180 kW YS190XYE04 induction (front); 245 kW TZ184QY301 PMSM (rear)
- Power output: 328–670 hp (245–500 kW; 333–679 PS)
- Battery: 63.8 kWh LFP CATL; 75.2 kWh LFP CATL
- Electric range: 640–725 km (398–450 mi) (CLTC)

Dimensions
- Wheelbase: 2,920 mm (115.0 in)
- Length: 4,999 mm (196.8 in)
- Width: 1,919 mm (75.6 in)
- Height: 1,479 mm (58.2 in)
- Curb weight: 1,895–2,090 kg (4,178–4,608 lb)

The Geely Galaxy TT (Chinese: 吉利银河TT; pinyin: Jílì Yínhé TT) is a battery electric mid-size sedan manufactured by the Chinese car manufacturer Geely Auto under the Geely Galaxy marque. The TT is essentially the performance oriented variant of the Geely Galaxy E8.

== Overview ==
Despite being based on the Galaxy E8, several areas of the sedan was completely restyled with the most obvious difference being the front end, resulting in a drag coefficient of 0.22. Overall, the design of the TT was in the same style as the Xiaomi SU7 regardless of proportions, with several design details such as the front fascia layout and air intake style inspired by Xiaomi's sports sedan. A limited edition TT Ultra started pre-sales in July 2026 with an initial limited release of 999 units, while the regular TT started pre-sales in August 2026. The vehicle uses the Sustainable Experience Architecture platform, a platform shared by cars from other Geely brands such as the Zeekr 001 and Polestar 4.

Geely says that due to the TT's cell-to-body design and thin battery pack, the interior has 30 mm (1.2 in) more longitudinal passenger space. The TT has all-aluminium suspension components and uses double wishbone front and five-link rear suspension geometries with hydraulic bushings. Additionally, it has optional continuous damping control which is capable of using live LiDAR sensor data to identify and prepare for incoming bumps.

The interior of the TT features a wrapped interior layout offering 4 color themes, including Mellow Red and Rock Black. The interconnected multi-screen setup runs Flyme Auto second Gen operating system through a main 10.2-inch LCD screen, a 15.4-inch central panel, and a wide 25.6-inch AR-HUD display. The TT has a 23-speaker 7.1.4 Bang & Olufsen surround sound system.

Rear view

Interior

== Powertrain ==
The TT uses a high-voltage 800V platform architecture. Batteries are CATL supplied 52.4 kWh, 63.8 kWh, and 75.2 kWh Shenxing TT LFP batteries supporting CLTC ranges of 540 km, 640 km, 650 km, and 725 km respectively. Top trim level of the Galaxy TT features a dual-motor, four-wheel-drive layout that is capable of putting out 180 kW (241 hp) from the front motor and the rear motor provides 245 kW (329 hp), resulting in a combined output of 425 kW (570 hp). This enables propelling the car from 0–100 km/h in 3.8 seconds and reaching a top speed of 210 km/h. According to Geely, the Galaxy TT has the world's first 16-in-1 electric drive system, which has a claimed peak efficiency of 93.8%.

Specifications
Battery		Motor		Power	Torque	Range	10–80% charge	0–100 km/h (62 mph)	Top speed	Kerb weight
Type	Weight	Front	Rear	Power	Torque	CLTC	10–80% charge	0–100 km/h (62 mph)	Top speed	Kerb weight
63.8 kWh LFP CATL	465 kg (1,025 lb)	—	245 kW TZ184QY301 PMSM	328 hp (245 kW; 333 PS)	320 N⋅m (236 lb⋅ft)	640 km (398 mi)	11.6 min	6.5 sec	201 km/h (125 mph)	1,895 kg (4,178 lb)
75.2 kWh LFP CATL	537 kg (1,184 lb)	—	245 kW TZ184QY301 PMSM	328 hp (245 kW; 333 PS)	320 N⋅m (236 lb⋅ft)	725 km (450 mi)	11.8 min	6.5 sec	201 km/h (125 mph)	1,980 kg (4,365 lb)
75.2 kWh LFP CATL	540 kg (1,190 lb)	180 kW YS190XYE04 induction	245 kW TZ184QY301 PMSM	570 hp (425 kW; 578 PS)	597 N⋅m (440 lb⋅ft)	650 km (404 mi)	11.8 min	3.8 sec	210 km/h (130 mph)	2,090 kg (4,608 lb)

== Sales ==
Within 15 minutes of its launch on 10 September 2026, the Galaxy TT received over 10,000 pre-orders.
