= Smart 5 =

Mid-size crossover SUV

Smart #5
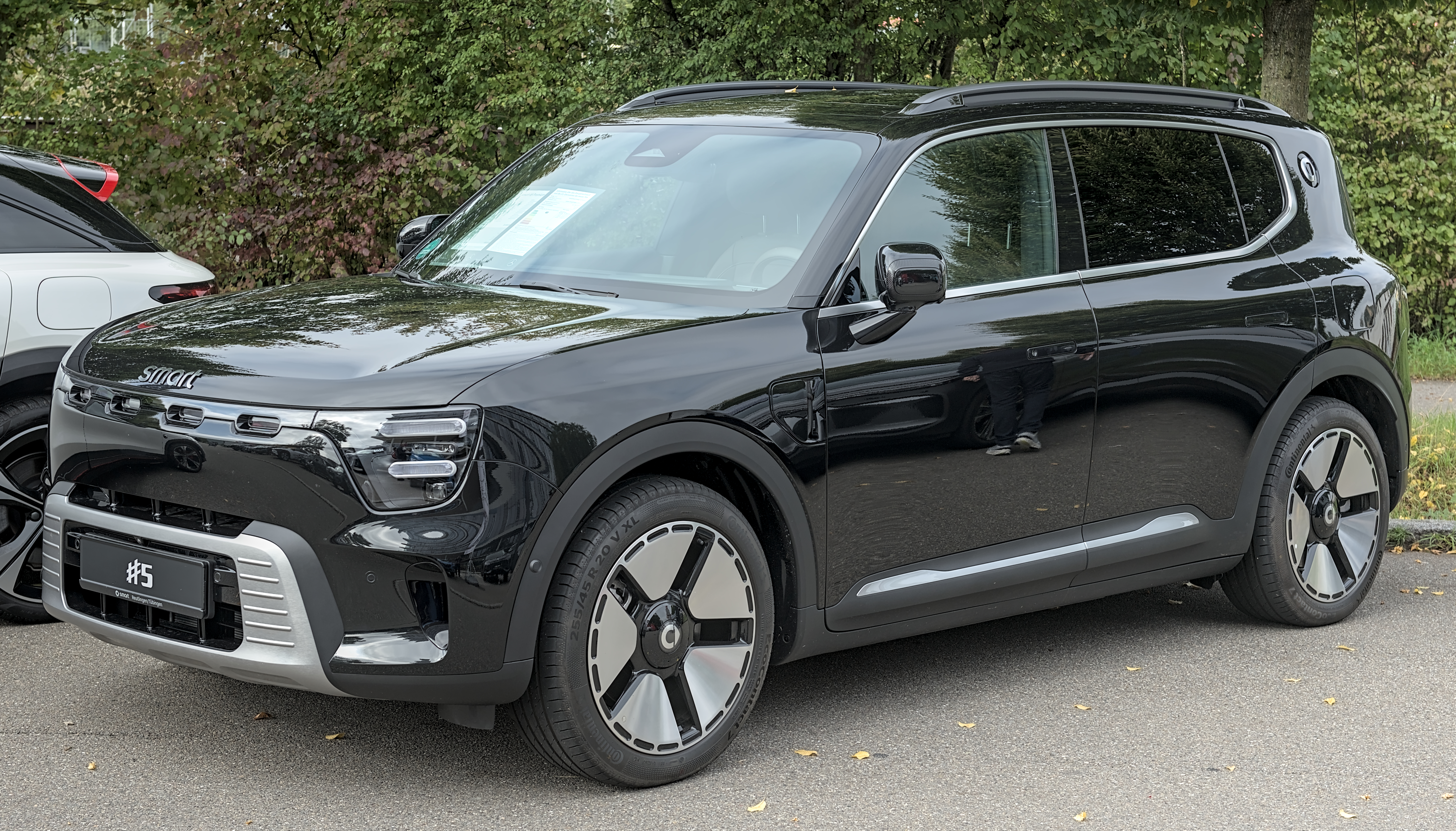

Overview
- Manufacturer: Smart Automobile
- Model code: HY11
- Also called: Smart Jingling #5 (China)
- Production: 2024–present
- Assembly: China: Huzhou, Zhejiang

Body and chassis
- Class: Mid-size crossover SUV (D)
- Body style: 5-door SUV
- Layout: Front-engine, dual-motor, four-wheel-drive (PHEV); Rear-motor, rear-wheel-drive; Dual-motor, four-wheel-drive
- Platform: PMA2+ platform (BEV); GEA Evo platform (EREV)
- Related: PMA2+ platform: Zeekr 7X; GEA Evo: Smart #6; Geely Galaxy M9

Powertrain
- Engine: 1.5L BHE15-CFZ turbo I4
- Electric motor: 1× or 2× permanent magnet synchronous
- Power output: 335–637 hp (340–646 PS; 250–475 kW)
- Transmission: 3-speed DHT (Dedicated Hybrid Transmission).
- Hybrid drivetrain: Geely NordThor Hybrid 2.0 (PHEV)
- Battery: 20 or 41 kWh 800V CATL (Aegis short blade) LFP; 74.4 kWh 800V CATL Aegis Short Blade LFP; 94 kWh CATL Qilin NCM
- Electric range: 549 km (341 mi) (WLTP); 740 km (460 mi) (Brabus, CLTC)
- Plug-in charging: 400 kW DC; 22 kW AC, V2L: 3.3 kW

Dimensions
- Wheelbase: 2,900 mm (114.2 in)
- Length: 4,705 mm (185.2 in)
- Width: 1,920 mm (75.6 in)
- Height: 1,705 mm (67.1 in)
- Curb weight: 2,450 kg (5,401 lb)

The Smart #5 (stylised as "smart #5") is a battery electric and plug-in hybrid mid-size crossover SUV developed and produced by Smart Automobile, a joint venture between Mercedes-Benz Group and Geely Holding. It is the third vehicle produced by the joint venture.

The vehicle is built on two different platforms developed by Geely, the BEV variant is based on the Sustainable Experience Architecture (SEA) electric vehicle platform, the EHD (PHEV variant) is built on Global Intelligent New Energy Architecture (GEA).

In China, the model is marketed as the Smart Jingling #5 (Chinese: 精灵#5; pinyin: Jingling Wuhao; lit. 'Elf #5').

== Overview ==
The #5 was first previewed by the Smart Concept #5 concept car at Auto China in April 2024. A Brabus-branded version with 646 hp is available since 2025.

The production version was unveiled on 13 June 2024. It is offered with four powertrain options.

=== Equipment ===
Its interior features a 10.3-inch full LCD instrument panel, two 13-inch central and passenger displays and a 25-inch augmented reality heads-up display, all powered by an AMD V2000 chip. Additional features include an optional 20-speaker Sennheiser audio system, 256-color ambient lighting, a front passenger seat with a zero-gravity function, and seven standard airbags. It has a 625 L (22.1 cu ft) trunk, which can be expanded to 1,525 L (53.9 cu ft) with the second row folded. It also has a 72 L (2.5 cu ft) frunk.

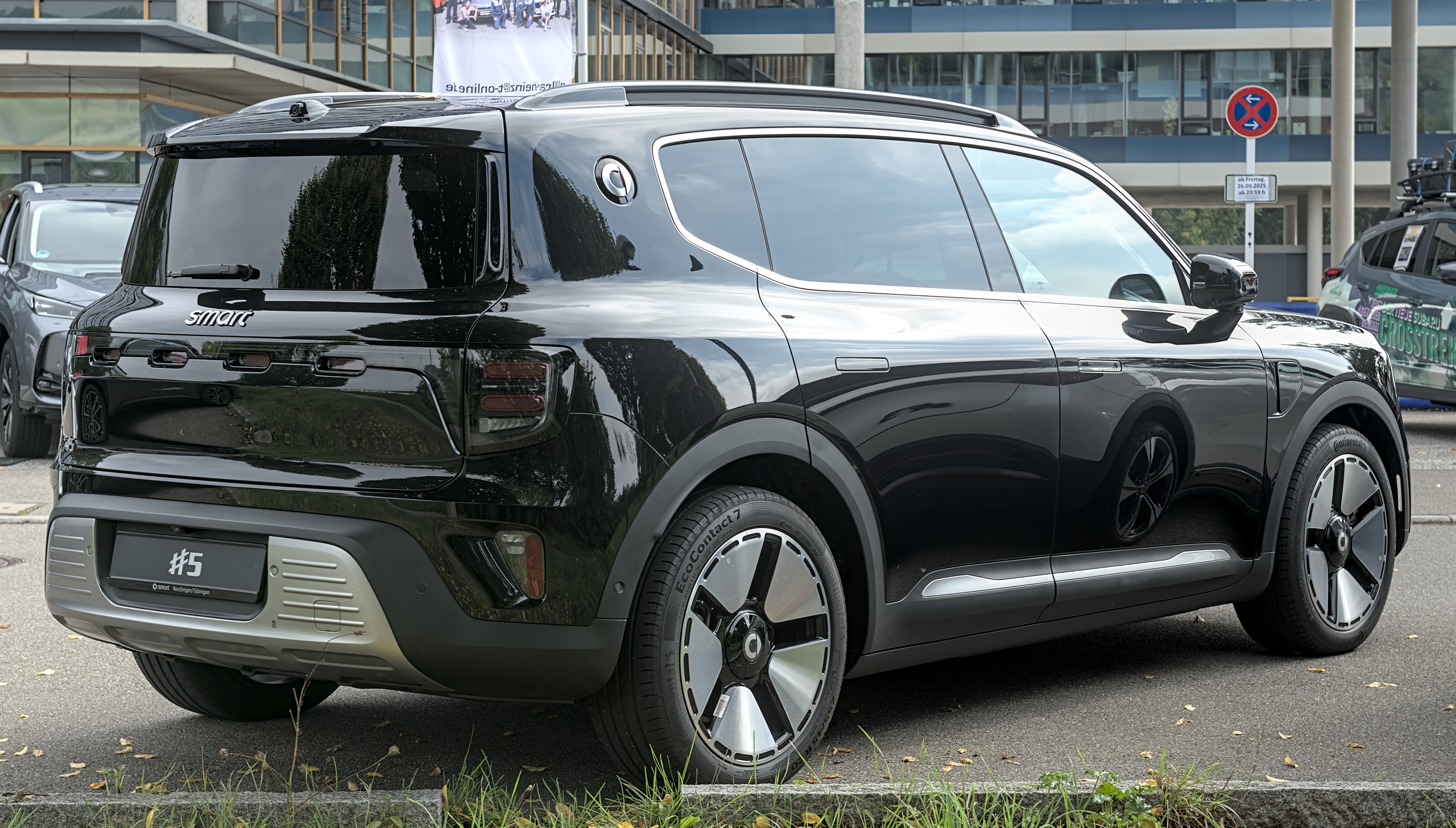
Rear view

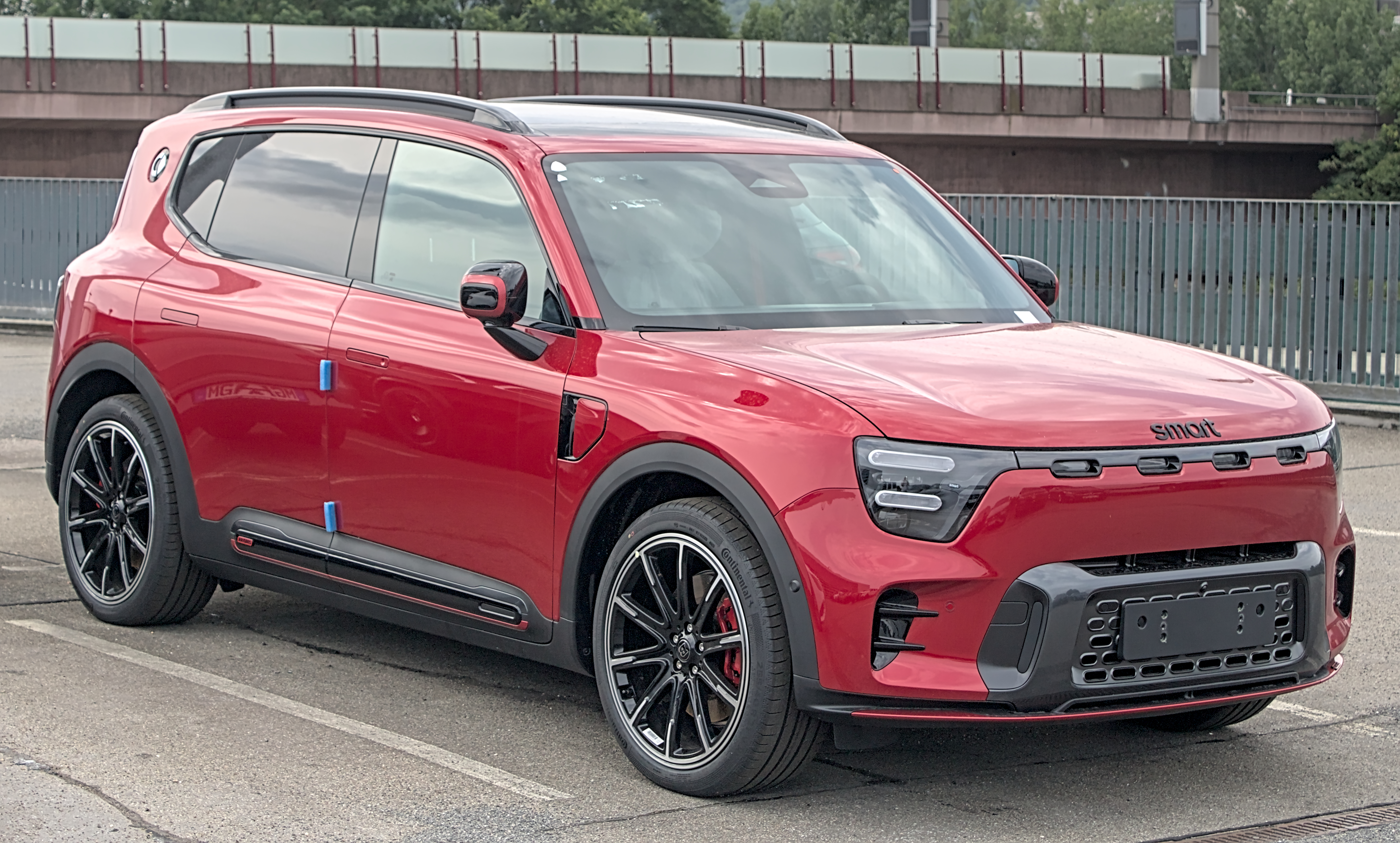
Smart #5 Brabus

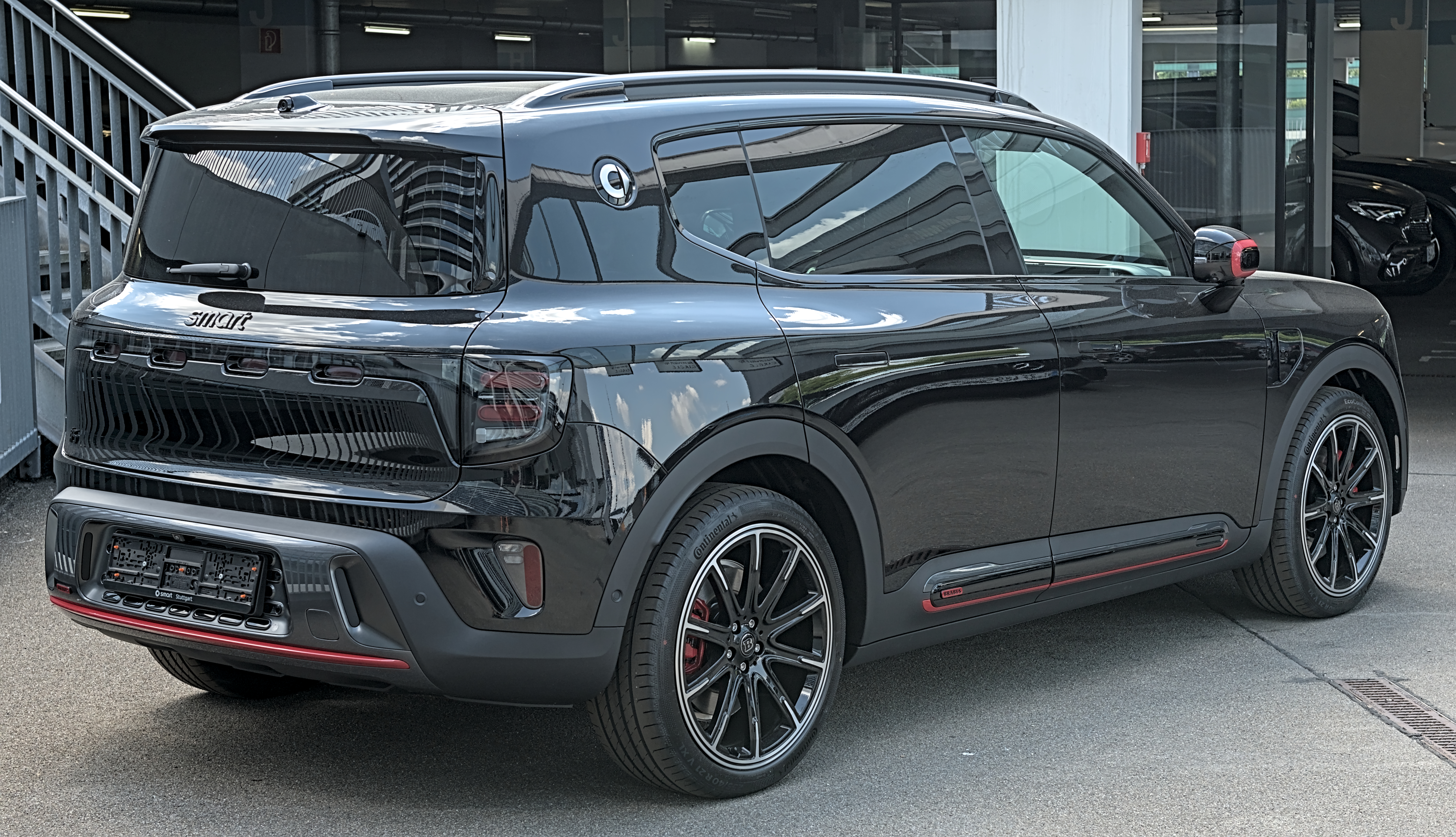
Rear view (Brabus)

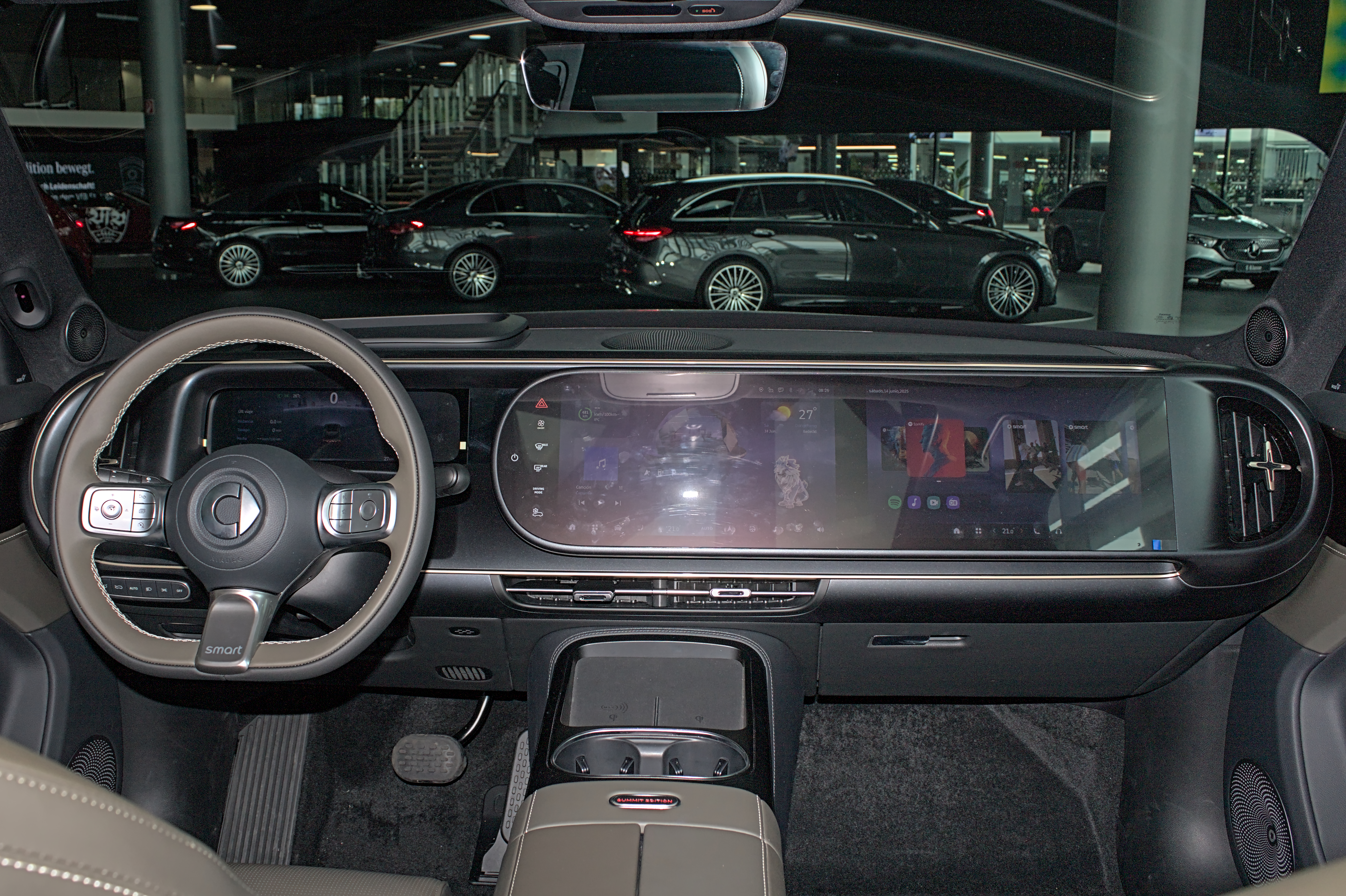
Interior

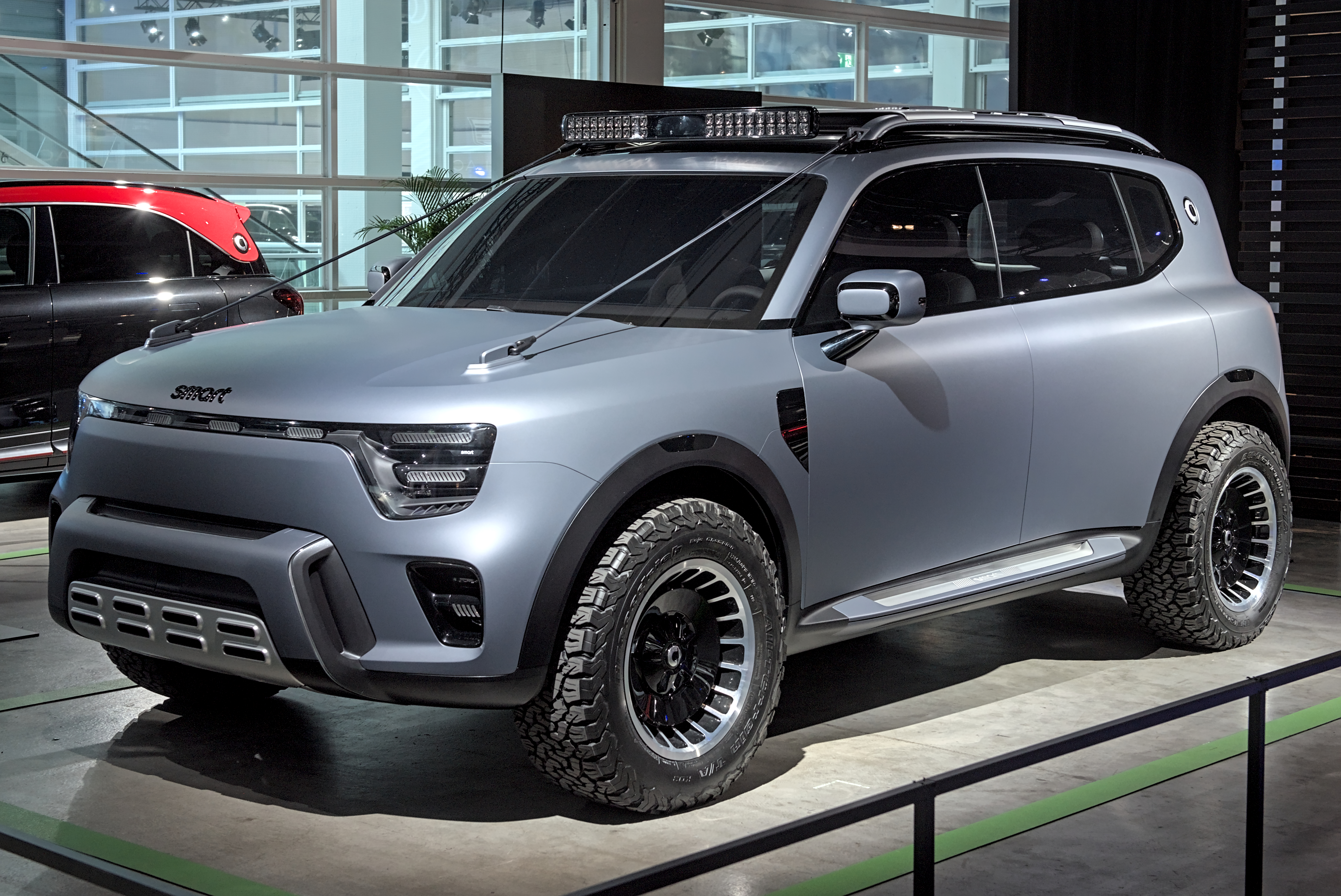
Smart Concept #5

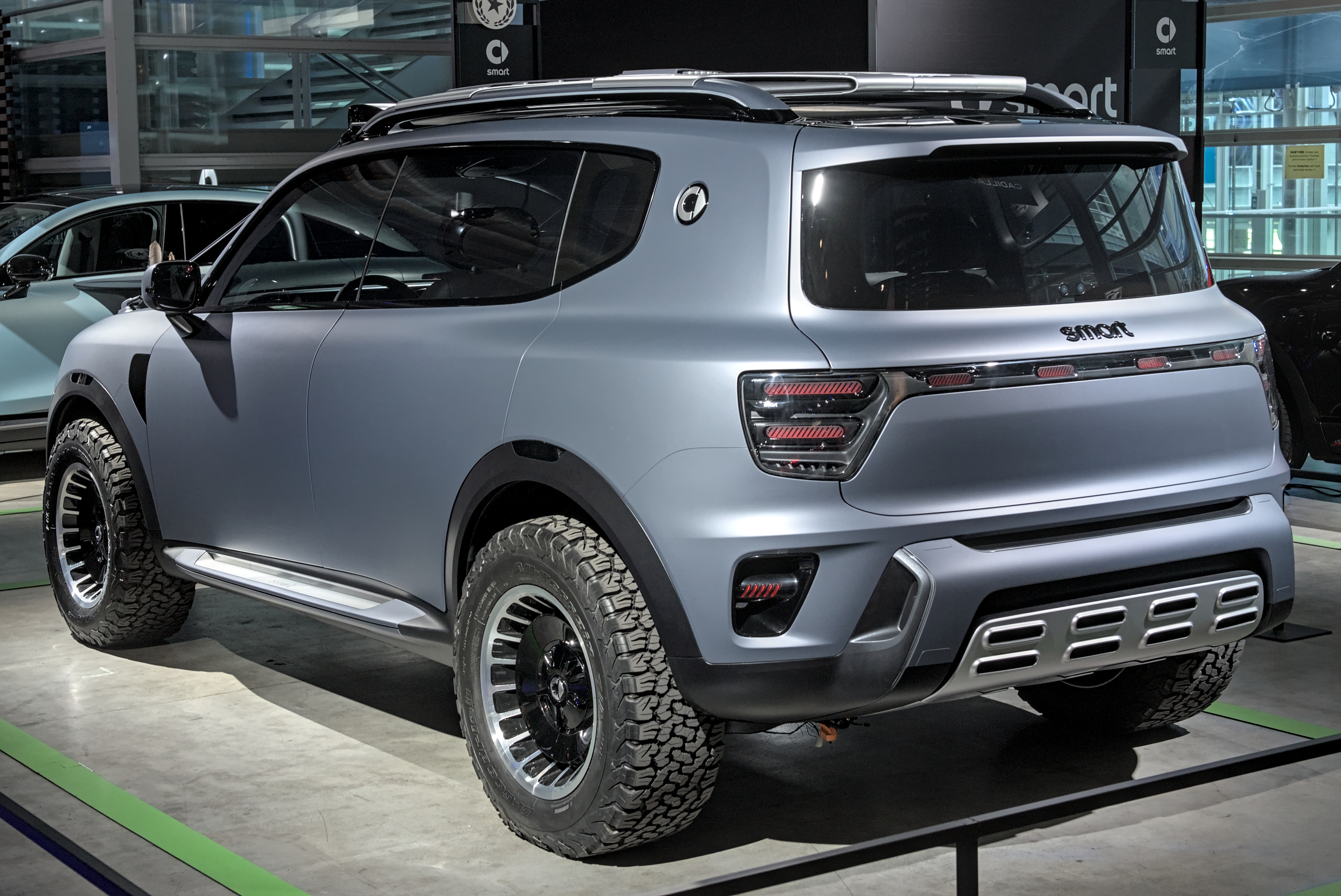
Rear view (Concept)

=== Safety ===
Euro NCAP test results smart #5 Pro (2025)
Test	Points	%
Overall:	5 /5 stars	
Adult occupant:	35.5	88%
Child occupant:	46.0	93%
Pedestrian:	53.2	84%
Safety assist:	16.7	92%

== Specifications ==
	#5 EHD (China only)		#5 Pro	#5 Pro+	#5 Pulse	#5 Brabus
Production period	from 09/2025		from 04/2025			
Engine specifications
Engine type	I4 petrol engine + rear electric motor		Rear electric motor		Front and rear electric motor	
Displacement	1,499 cc		—			
Motor design	Permanent magnet synchronous motor					
Max. power (ICE)	120 kW (163 PS; 161 hp)		—			
Max. power (electric motor)	200 kW (272 PS; 268 hp)		250 kW (340 PS; 335 hp)	267 kW (363 PS; 358 hp)	432 kW (588 PS; 579 hp)	475 kW (646 PS; 637 hp)
Max. torque (ICE)	255 N⋅m (188 lb⋅ft)		—			
Max. torque (electric motor)	380 N⋅m (280 lb⋅ft)		373 N⋅m (275 lb⋅ft)		643 N⋅m (474 lb⋅ft)	710 N⋅m (524 lb⋅ft)
Drivetrain
Drive configuration	All-wheel drive		Rear-wheel drive		All-wheel drive	
Transmission	3-speed hybrid transmission		Single-speed fixed gear			
Battery
Cell chemistry	LFP			NMC		
Energy capacity	20 kWh	41 kWh	76 kWh (74 kWh usable)	100 kWh (94 kWh usable)		
Performance
Electric range (WLTP)		208 km (129 mi)	465 km (289 mi)	590 km (367 mi)	540 km (336 mi)	
Fuel/energy consumption per 100 km (WLTP, combined)		0.5 L petrol	18.5 kWh	18.4 kWh	19.9 kWh	
Acceleration, 0–100 km/h (0–62 mph)	7.2 s	6.9 s		6.5 s	4.9 s	3.8 s
Top speed	185 km/h (115 mph)		200 km/h (124 mph)			210 km/h (130 mph)
Max. charging power (AC)			11 kW	22 kW		
Max. charging power (DC)			150 kW	400 kW		
Curb weight		2,190 kg (4,828 lb)	2,200 kg (4,850 lb)	2,260 kg (4,982 lb)	2,345 kg (5,170 lb)	2,378 kg (5,241 lb)

== Sales ==
Year	China		
Year	EV	PHEV	Total
2024	1,376	—	1,376
2025	2,862	2,251	5,113
