= Geely Galaxy E8 =

Battery electric mid-size sedan

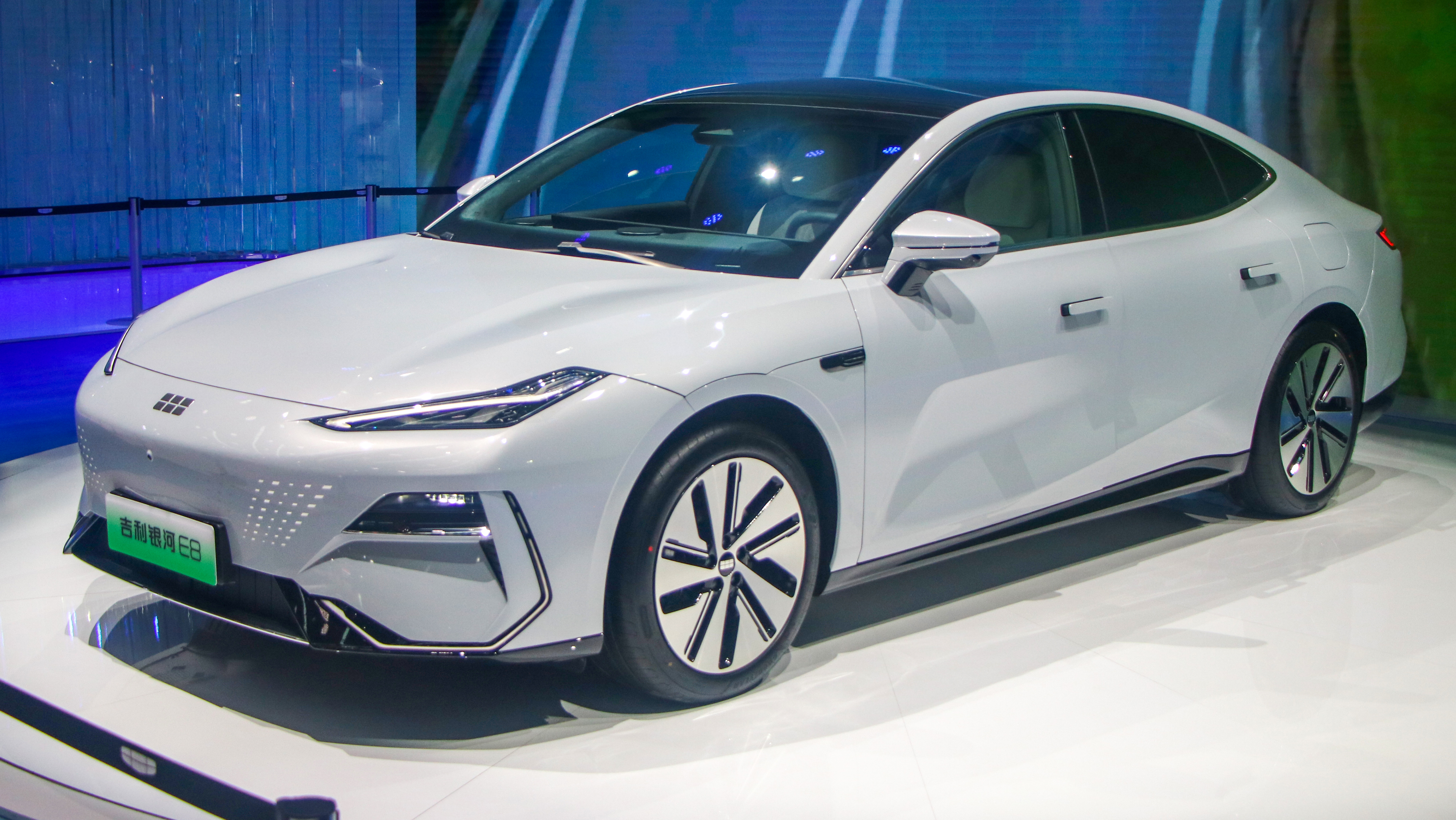

Overview
- Manufacturer: Geely Auto
- Model code: E171
- Also called: Geely Galaxy Light (concept); Geely E8 (Belarus)
- Production: 2024–present
- Assembly: China: Qiantang, Hangzhou

Body and chassis
- Class: Mid-size car (D)
- Body style: 4-door fastback sedan
- Layout: Rear-motor, rear-wheel-drive; Dual-motor, four-wheel-drive
- Platform: PMA2+ platform
- Related: Geely Galaxy TT; Geely Galaxy Starshine 8; Zeekr 007

Powertrain
- Electric motor: Permanent magnet synchronous
- Power output: 200–475 kW (272–646 PS; 268–637 hp)
- Battery: 62 kWh Sunwoda LFP; 76 kWh Quzhou Jidian LFP
- Electric range: 550–665 km (342–413 mi) (CLTC)

Dimensions
- Wheelbase: 2,925 mm (115.2 in)
- Length: 5,010 mm (197 in)
- Width: 1,920 mm (76 in)
- Height: 1,465 mm (57.7 in)
- Curb weight: 1,905–2,150 kg (4,200–4,740 lb)

The Geely Galaxy E8 (Chinese: 吉利银河E8; pinyin: Jílì Yínhé E8) is a battery electric mid-size sedan manufactured by the Chinese car manufacturer Geely Auto under the Geely Galaxy marque. The E8 is the Geely Galaxy marque's third model, after the L7 SUV and L6 sedan. It is also the brand's first battery electric vehicle.

The plug-in hybrid version of the E8 is the Galaxy Starshine 8.

== Overview ==
A preliminary design of the E8 was unveiled in 2023 as the Galaxy Light concept. The production model E8 was unveiled in November 2023, with pre-sales beginning that same month. The vehicle uses the Sustainable Experience Architecture platform, a platform shared by cars from several other Geely-owned brands such as the Zeekr 001 and Polestar 4.

The interior of the E8 features a distinctive 45" 8K OLED display that stretches almost the entire width of the dashboard. This infotainment section runs on a Qualcomm Snapdragon 8295 processor. Other features present in the interior of the E8 include ambient mood lighting, a wireless charging pad and a panoramic sunroof.

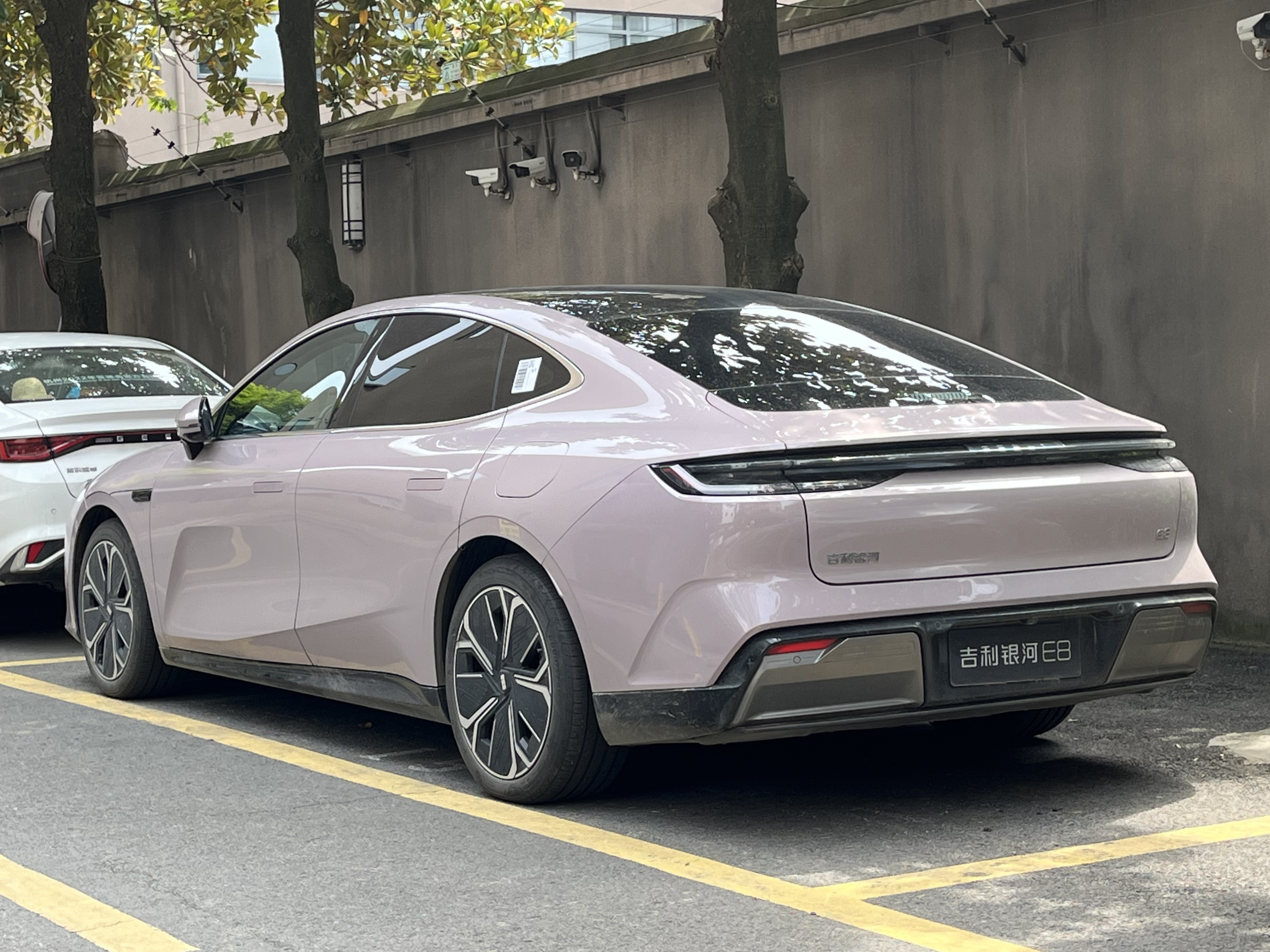
Rear view

== Powertrain ==
The top trim level of the E8, named the Starship Performance Edition, features a Dual-motor, four-wheel-drive layout that is capable of putting out 475 kW of combined power and 710Nm combined torque. This is capable is propelling the car from 0–100 km/h in 3.5 seconds and reaching a top speed of 210 km/h. According to Geely, the E8 achieves a 50/50 weight distribution.

This trim level features an LFP battery with a capacity of 75.6 kWh, giving it a range of 620 km (390 mi) on the CLTC cycle. The battery on this trim is able to be charged from 10 to 80% in 20 minutes.

== Sales ==
Year	China
2024	31,582
2025	13,748
