= Geely Galaxy M9 =

Plug-in hybrid full-size SUV

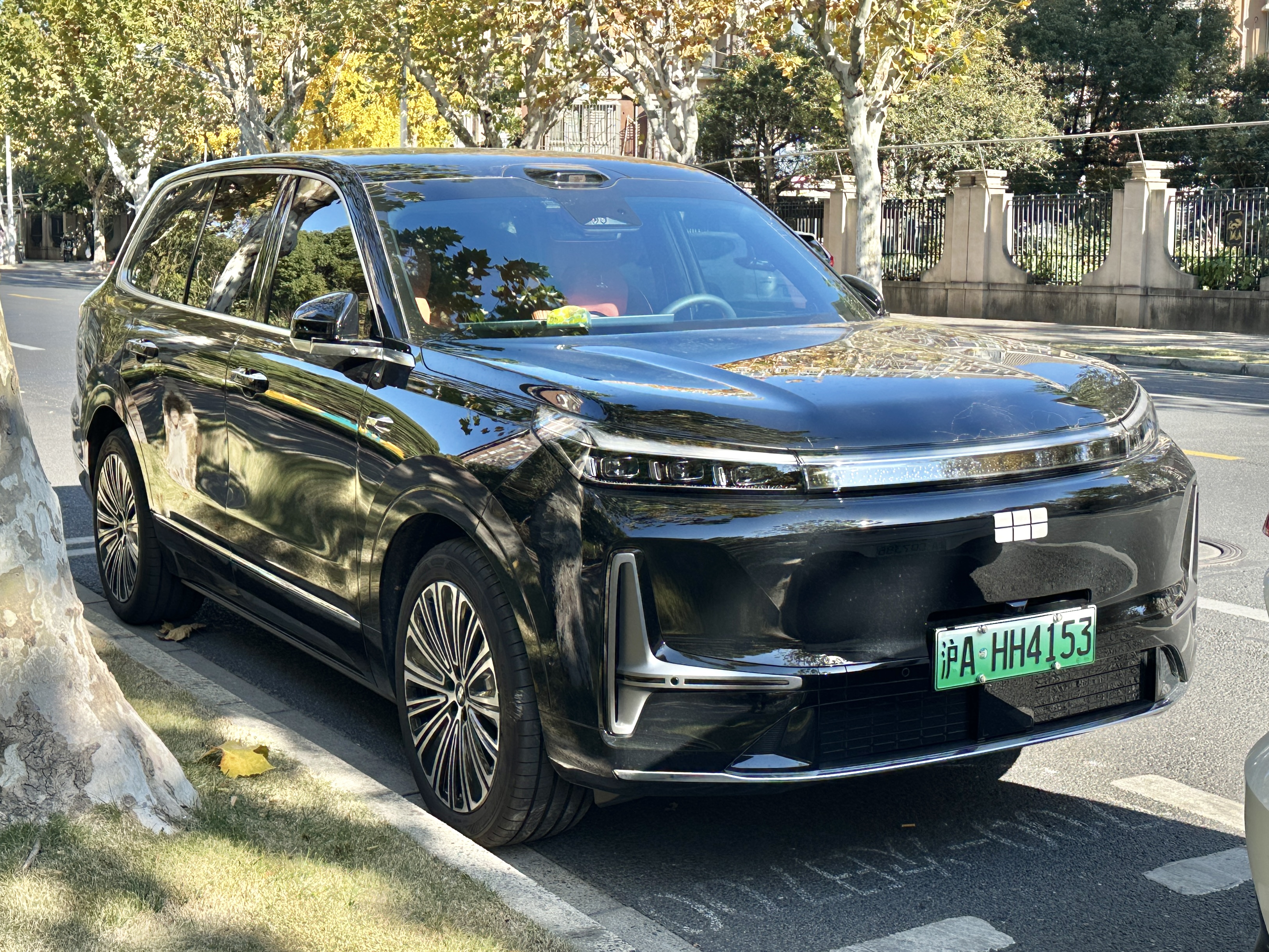

Overview
- Manufacturer: Geely Auto
- Model code: P117
- Also called: Geely Galaxy M8 (5-seater version); Geely M9 (Middle East)
- Production: July 2025 – present
- Assembly: China: Huzhou

Body and chassis
- Class: Full-size SUV (F)
- Body style: 5-door SUV
- Layout: Front-engine, front-motor, front-wheel-drive; Front-engine, tri-motor, all-wheel-drive
- Platform: Global Energy Architecture Evo
- Related: Geely Galaxy Starshine 8; Lynk & Co 10

Powertrain
- Engine: Petrol plug-in hybrid: 1.5 L BHE15-CFZ turbocharged I4
- Power output: 402 horsepower (300 kW; 408 PS) (FWD); 858 horsepower (640 kW; 870 PS) (AWD)
- Transmission: 3-speed DHT
- Hybrid drivetrain: Series-parallel (PHEV)
- Battery: 18.4 and 41.46 kWh LFP
- Range: 1,500 kilometres (932 mi)
- Electric range: 100–210 kilometres (62–130 mi) [WLTC]

Dimensions
- Wheelbase: 3,030 mm (119.3 in)
- Length: 5,205 mm (204.9 in)
- Width: 1,999 mm (78.7 in)
- Height: 1,800 mm (70.9 in)
- Curb weight: 2,180–2,530 kg (4,806–5,578 lb)

The Geely Galaxy M9 (Chinese: 吉利银河M9; pinyin: Jílì Yínhé M9) is a plug-in hybrid full-size SUV manufactured by the Chinese car manufacturer Geely Auto under the Geely Galaxy marque.

== Geely Galaxy Starship concept (2024) ==
A preliminary design of the M9 was unveiled in 2024 as the Geely Galaxy Starship concept. It was shown at the Beijing Auto Show that year. The concept was Geely's envision of an SUV with a next-gen hybrid powertrain that should consume no more than two liters of petrol for every 100 kilometers.

The Galaxy Starship concept won the Red Dot Design Award's Design Concept award in 2024.

=== Design and features ===
The Starship concept's doors combined elements of suicide doors and gullwing doors, with the lower part of the doors opening like suicide doors with the glass opening upwards like gullwing doors. These doors did not make it into the production model. Twin shark fins are present on the back alongside a full-width light bar. Concealed door handles are used alongside three-spoke wheels meant to decrease drag. The concept's seats can recline flat and the interior is powered by a Qualcomm Snapdragon 8295 chip. The dot-matrix design at the front is inspired by that of the Galaxy E8. An 11-in-1 electric drive system was introduced by the Galaxy Starship alongside a new version of the NordThor series of plug-in hybrid systems from Geely.

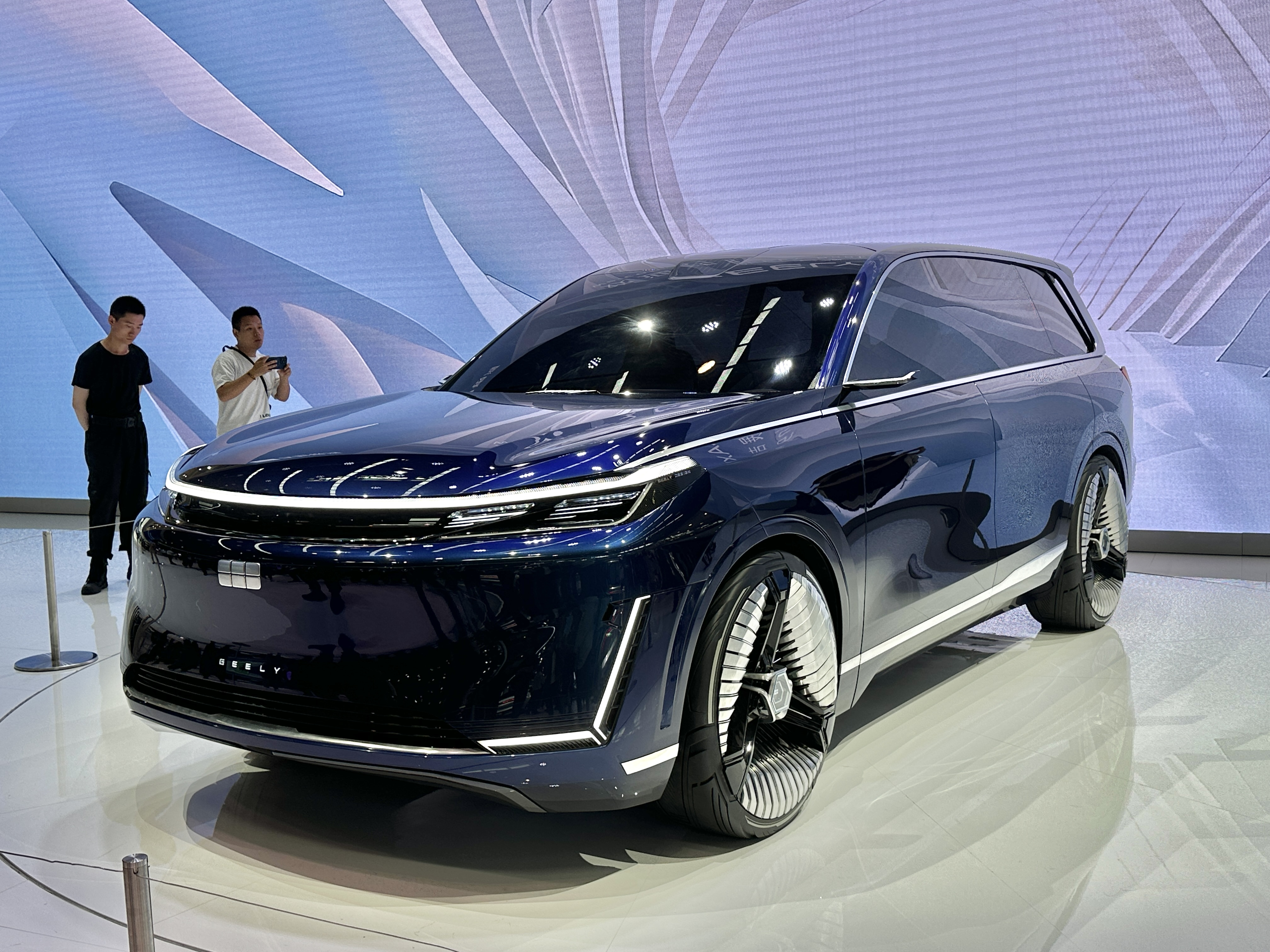
The Geely Galaxy Starship at 2024 Beijing Motor Show.

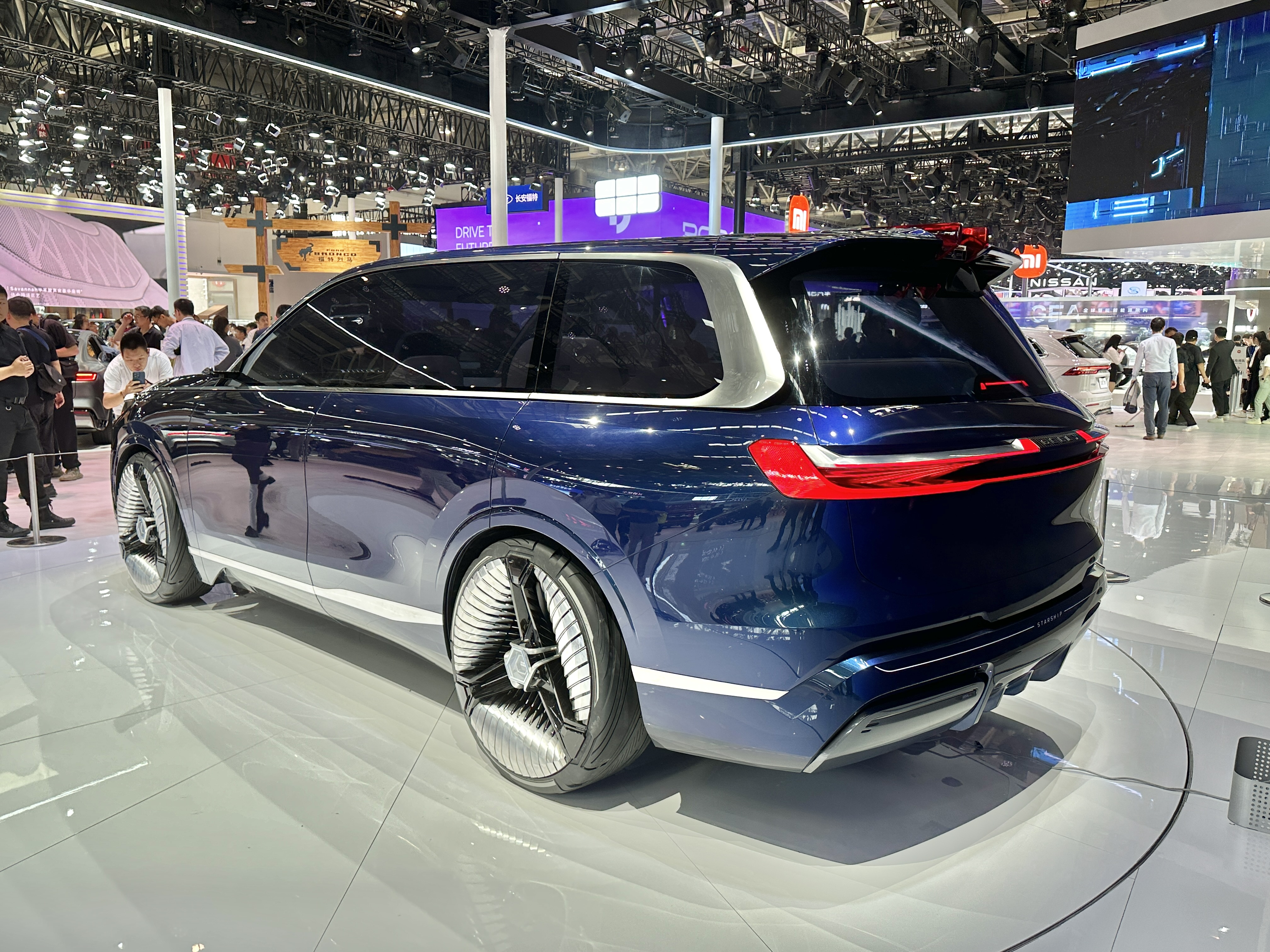
Rear view

== Production model ==
The Galaxy M9 is a full-size plug-in hybrid SUV. It uses the Thor EM-P plug-in hybrid system made by Geely and is based on a new version of the GEA platform. Geely unveiled the M9 during an event in Milan, Italy on May 23, 2025. It uses an AI-tuned digital chassis developed with input from Lotus engineers, with the unveiling of the M9 also showing Geely's global ambitions.

Pre-sales of the Galaxy M9 began on August 23, 2025, and reached 40,000 pre-orders just a day after reservations opened. The first M9 units began reaching dealers on August 14.

Filippo Inzaghi is the brand ambassador of the M9. He was invited to be the brand ambassador on June 10, 2025, and later accepted the role on June 12.

A Galaxy M9 competed an endurance run that was roughly 11,185 miles (18,000 kilometers) long across Europe and Asia as part of a long-distance durability showcase. Said endurance run ended with a public teardown of the M9 in Paris on November 30, 2025.

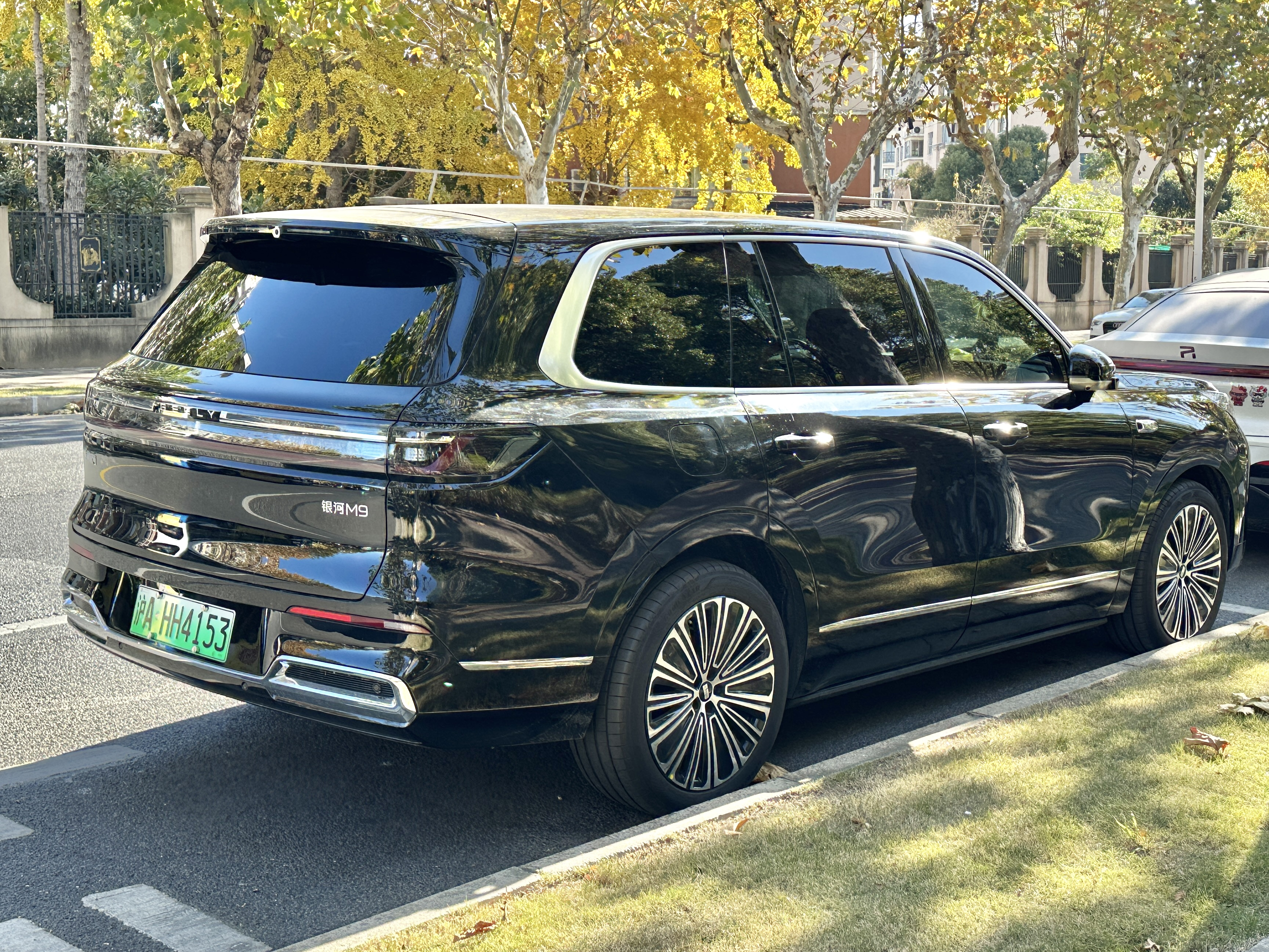
Rear view

=== Design and features ===
Geely's design studios in Milan and Shanghai were responsible for the design of the M9. The exterior design of the M9 retains some design elements from the Galaxy Starship concept, such as the front light bar with matrix-LED headlights, and the rear light bars inspired by a rising sun. Traditional door handles are used in place of hidden units. It is available with 20-inch rims and 255/50 tires or 21-inch rims and 265/45 tires.

The interior features an LCD instrument panel and a 30-inch widesreen display combining the central and passenger display into out unit. Additional features include two 50W phone chargers in the front, a 9.1 L (0.32 cu ft) refrigerator, and ambient lighting. The rear seets can recline up to 150 degrees.

The M9 uses the G-Pilot H5 ADAS system that uses a roof-mounted lidar module. Geely also claims the M9 features the world's first "in-vehicle intelligent AI agent".

== Powertrain ==
The M9 is powered by the NordThor AI Hybrid 2.0 EM-P hybrid system. The engine is a 1.5 liter turbocharged inline 4 codenamed BHE15-CFZ making an estimated 161 horsepower. The batteries are LFP batteries and are supplied by CATL and the electric range goes from 85 to 185 kilometers depending on the size of the battery. At prelaunch the range figure for models with the 18.4 kWh battery was raised to 100 kilometres (62 mi) and the range figure for models with the 41.5 kWh battery was raised to 210 kilometres (130 mi).

When pre-sales started, it was confirmed that front-wheel-drive models will be offered, with only the top trim being offered with all-wheel-drive. The top-of-the-line all-wheel-drive models use 3 electric motors and has a power output of 870 horsepower. (Note: When the M9 was first revealed in MIIT documents, it was speculated that it would use a front-engine, dual-motor, all-wheel-drive layout, the same as the Lynk & Co 10, which came before the M9. At that time it was also speculated to use 697 horsepower.)

The M9 gets a maximum combined range of 935 miles (1,505 km).

== Sales ==
Year	China
2025	31,101
