= Lynk & Co 10 =

Plug-in hybrid and battery electric executive sedan

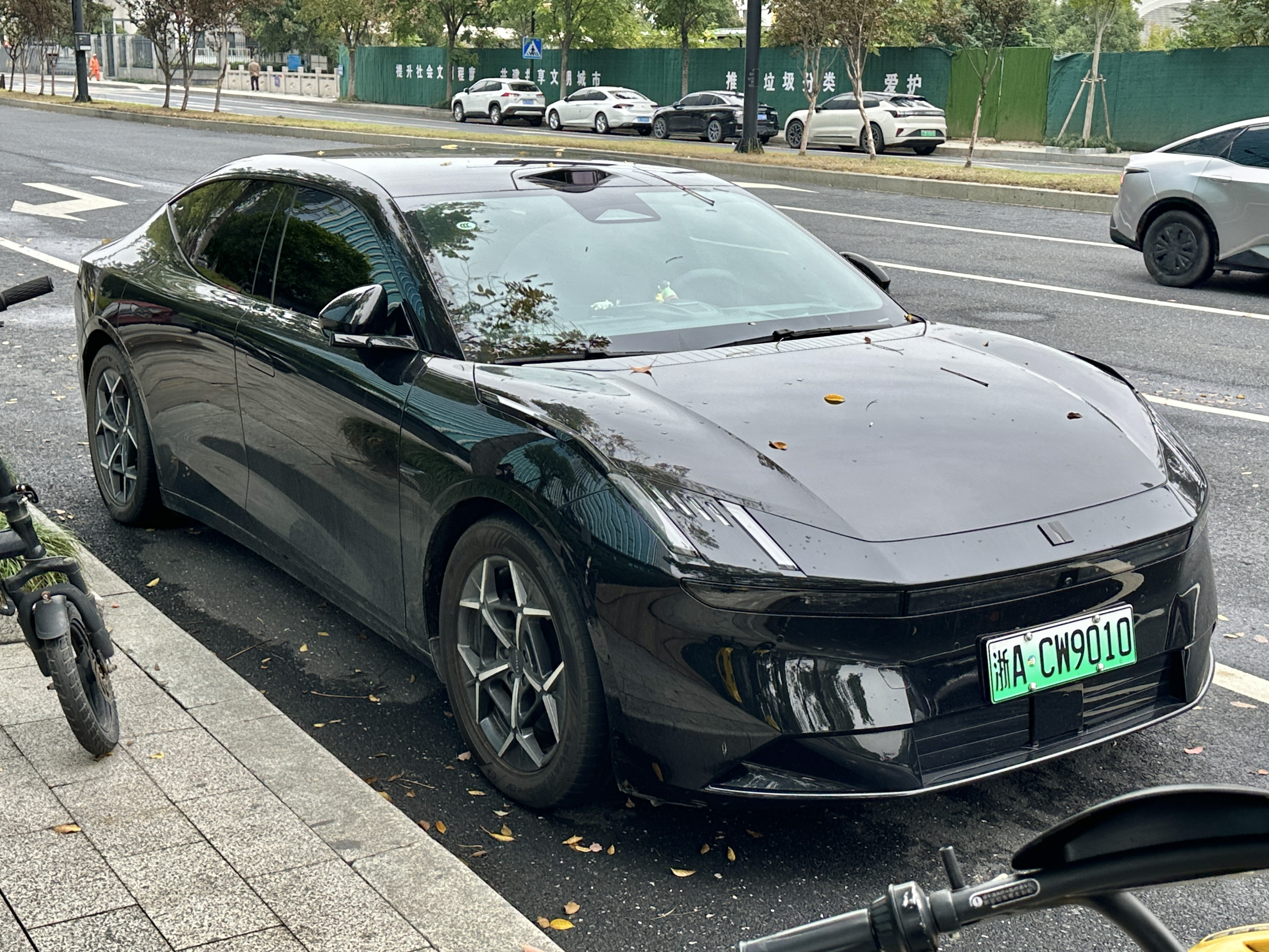

Overview
- Manufacturer: Lynk & Co (Geely)
- Production: 2024–present
- Designer: Ivo Groen

Body and chassis
- Class: Executive car (E)
- Body style: 4-door sedan
- Layout: Battery electric: Rear-motor, rear-wheel-drive; Dual-motor, all-wheel-drive; Plug-in hybrid: Front-engine, dual-motor, all-wheel-drive

The Lynk & Co 10 (Chinese: 领克10; pinyin: Lǐng kè 10; pronounced "one zero" in English or "yao ling" in Chinese) is a plug-in hybrid and battery electric executive sedan manufactured by Zeekr-owned Chinese-Swedish automaker Lynk & Co. The electric version was originally launched in 2024 as the Lynk & Co Z10 before being changed back to Lynk & Co 10 in 2026. The battery electric Lynk & Co Z10 is built on the SEA1 platform, while the original plug-in hybrid Lynk & Co 10 is built on the GEA Evo platform, which made them mechanically two different vehicles.

Despite the PHEV version of the Lynk & Co 10 being a plug-in hybrid it does not use the EM-P suffix in its name. (Note: EM-P badges present on the back of the 10 PHEV.)

The electric variant of the car received an update and facelift in 2026. At the same time it was renamed as the 10 EV instead of the Z10. The electric version launched in 2026 is built on the 900V architecture.

== Lynk & Co Z10 (EV, E371, 2024) ==
Lynk & Co Z10
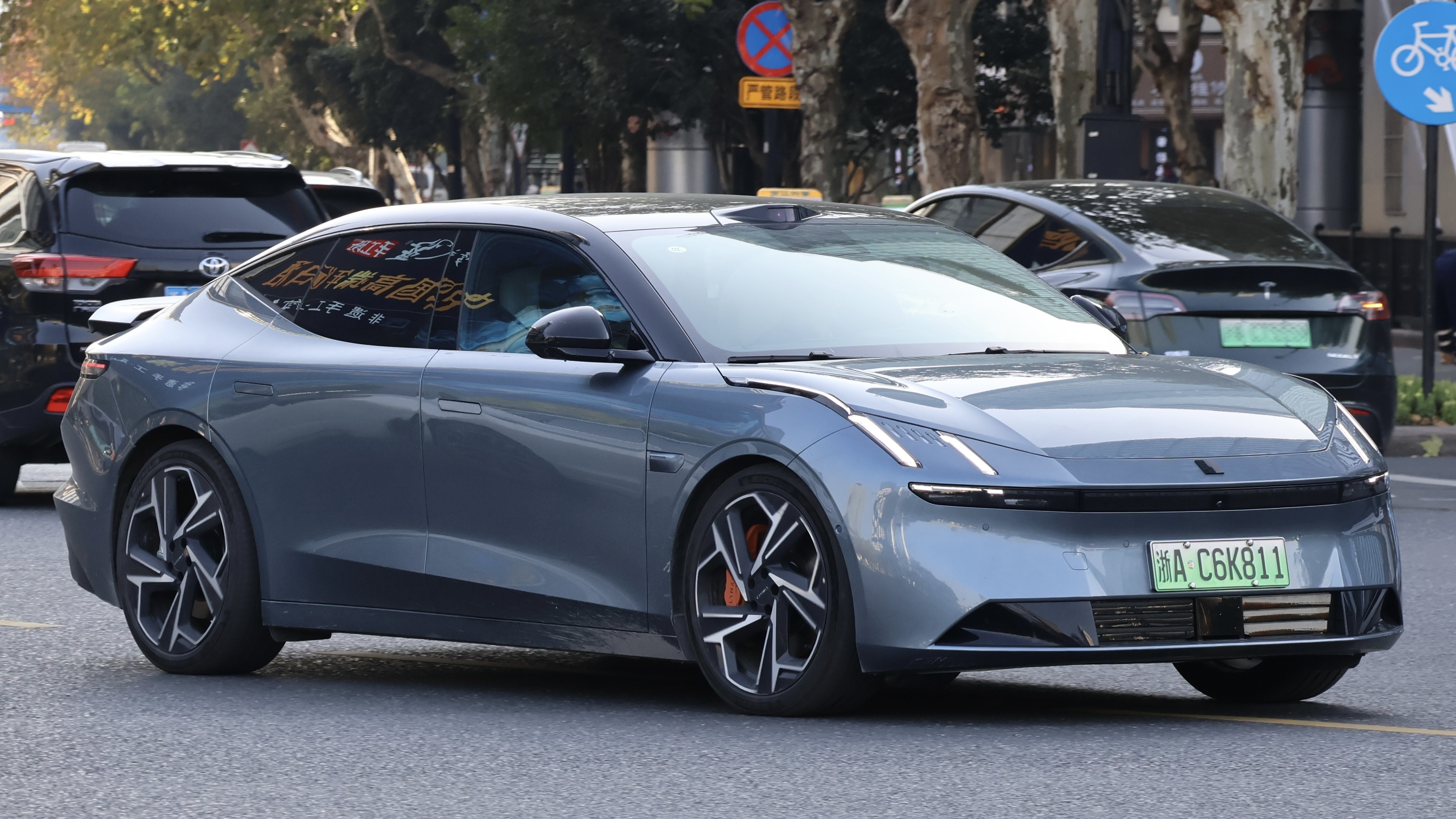

Overview
- Model code: E371
- Also called: Lynk & Co 10 (from 2026)
- Production: 2024–present
- Assembly: China

Body and chassis
- Layout: Rear-motor, rear-wheel-drive; Dual-motor, all-wheel-drive
- Platform: Sustainable Experience Architecture
- Related: Zeekr 001

Powertrain
- Battery: 71 kWh LFP VREMT; 77.17 kWh LFP VREMT; 95 kWh LFP VREMT
- Electric range: 536–816 km (333–507 mi) (CLTC)

Dimensions
- Wheelbase: 3,005 mm (118.3 in)
- Length: 5,028 mm (198.0 in)
- Width: 1,966 mm (77.4 in)
- Height: 1,468 mm (57.8 in)
- Curb weight: 2,098–2,468 kg (4,625–5,441 lb)

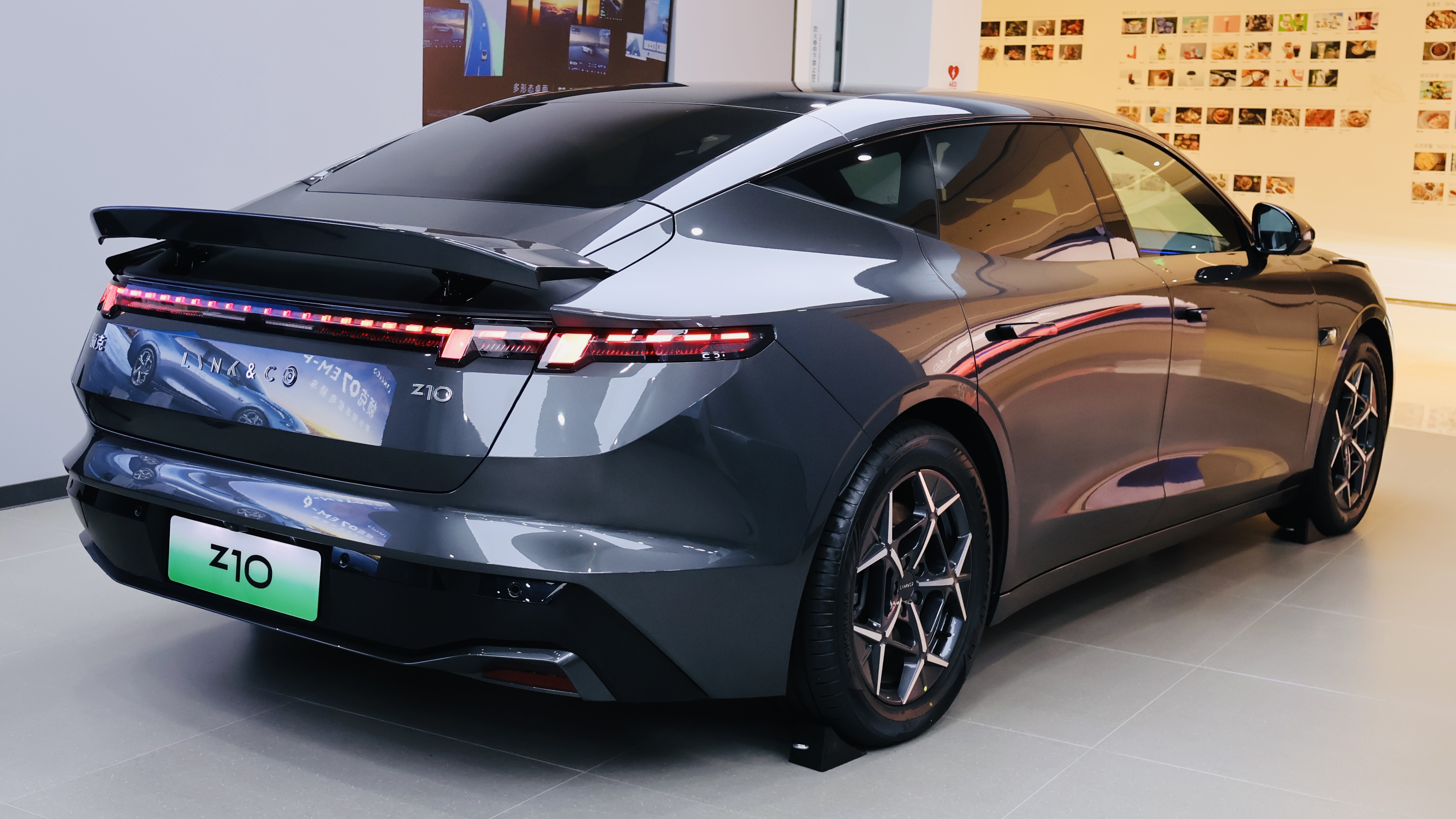
Rear view

The Lynk & Co Z10 (Chinese: 领克Z10; pinyin: Lǐng kè Z10) is a battery electric executive sedan manufactured by Geely owned Chinese-Swedish automaker Lynk & Co from 2024. It was previewed by the Lynk & Co The Next Day concept car, which was presented in China on summer 2024, announcing the next line of new models.

The Z10 is the first electric vehicle of the Chinese-Swedish automaker Lynk & Co. The plug-in hybrid version of the Z10, called the Lynk & Co 10 was revealed in June 2025 with sales expected to begin in the 3rd quarter of 2025.

The Z10 shares multiple design elements with a closely related Zeekr 001.

=== DreamSmart Z10 Starbuff ===
On 25 September, Lynk & Co and DreamSmart (formerly Xingji Meizu) released a gaming version of the Z10. It features the ECARX Makalu compute platform, and uses desktop level hardware such as an AMD Ryzen Embedded V2000A-series CPU, AMD Radeon RX6600M GPU, and a Samsung high-refresh OLED display, along with 5G connectivity. Additionally, it comes with a 23-speaker Harman Kardon sound system, Flyme Auto gaming cockpit software, and custom mounting points and slots for a foldable desk and a keyboard and mouse along with headphones. It is available at both DreamSmart and Lynk & Co sales channels, and deliveries start in November 2024.

=== 10+ ===
The Lynk & Co 10+ is the performance variant of the Lynk & Co 10 EV. The 10+ features a dual-motor setup producing a maximum power output of 680 kW (912 hp) and 913 N·m of torque. Accelerations from 0 to 100 km/h could be done in 3.2 seconds and the CLTC range is 536 km.

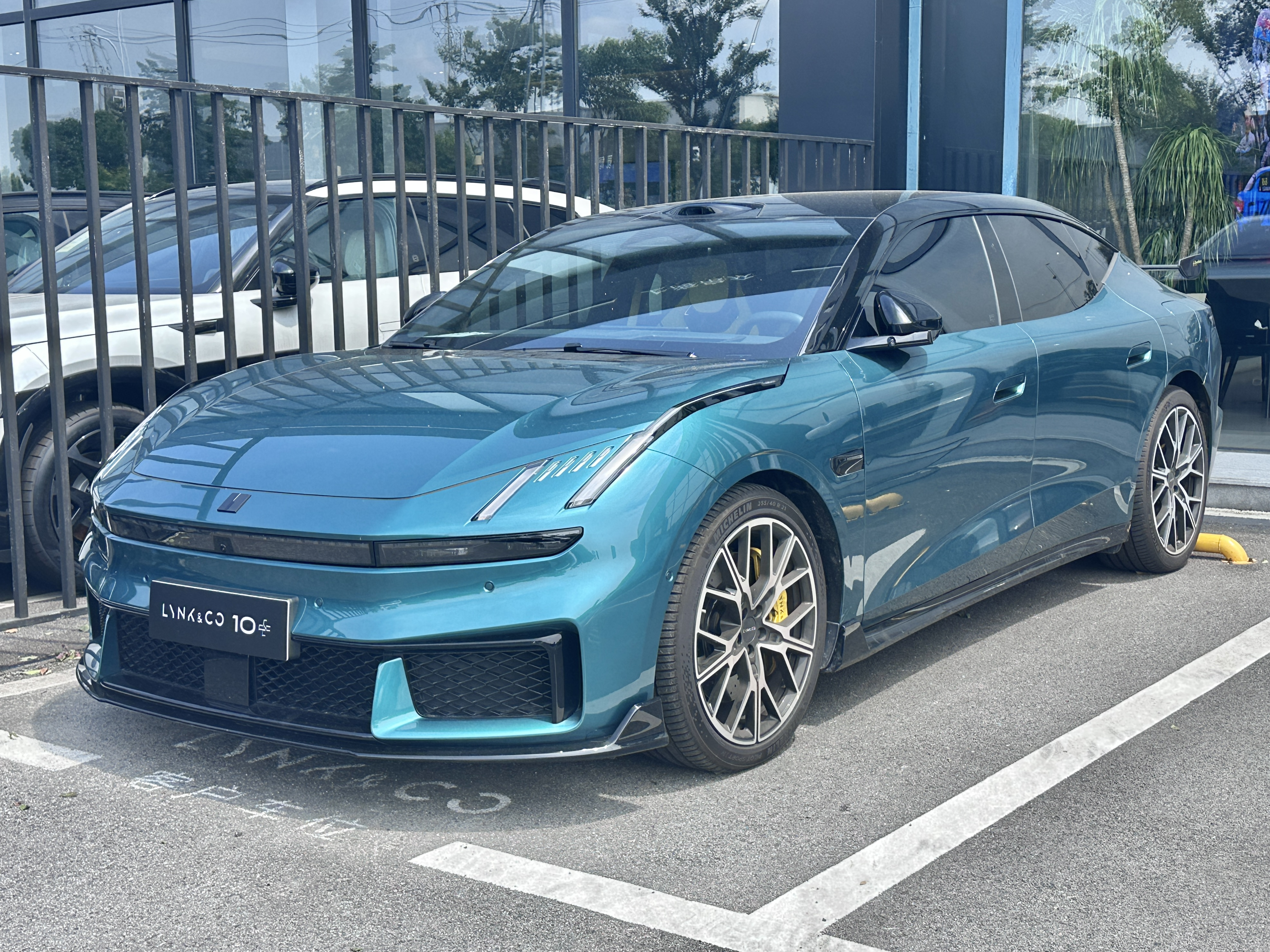
Lynk & Co 10+

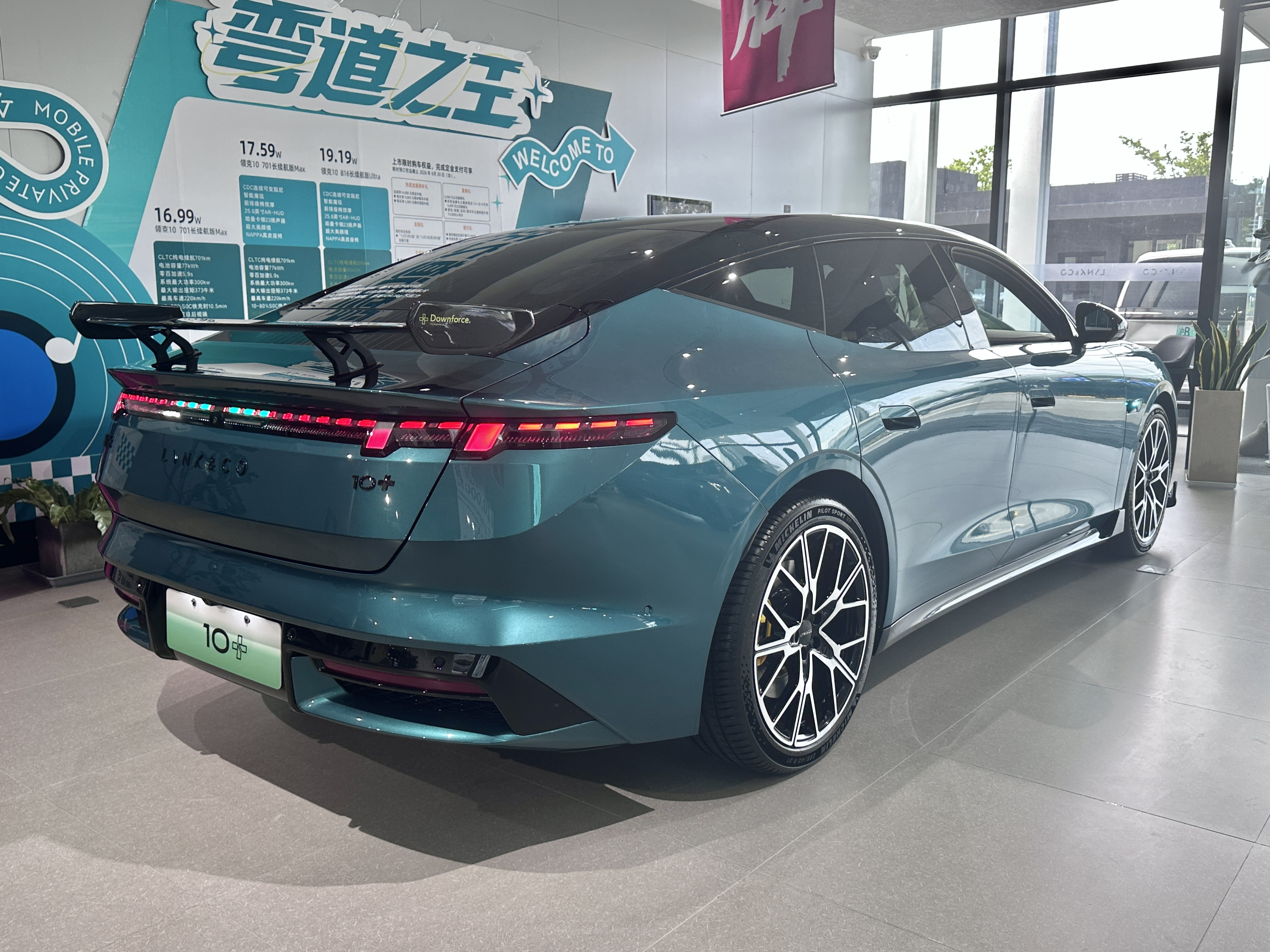
Rear

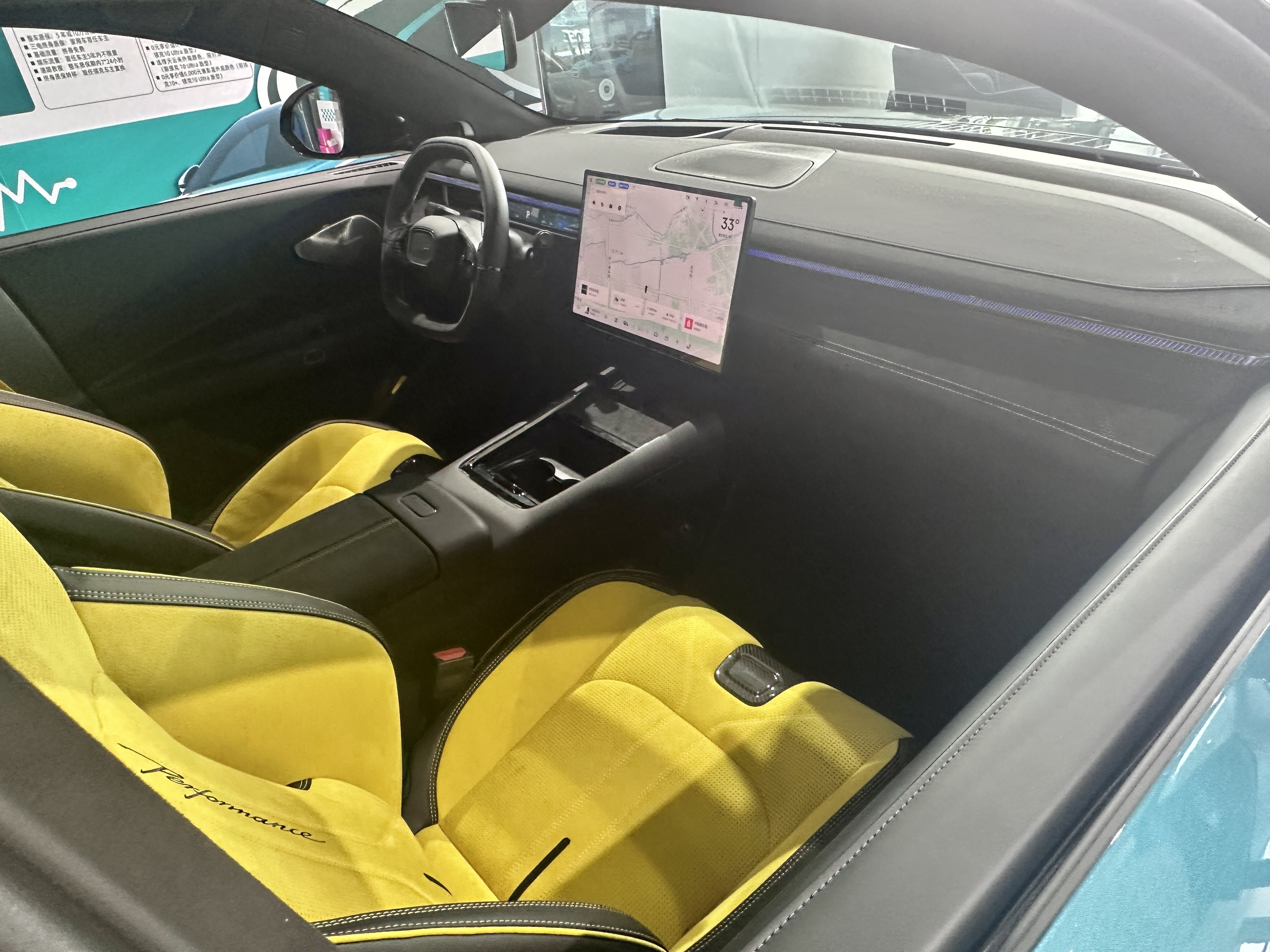
Interior

=== Specifications ===
The Z10 is equipped with batteries with a capacity of 71–95 kWh and electric motors with a power of 200–580 kW (272–789 hp) and a torque of 343–810 N⋅m. The car accelerates to 100 km/h in 3.5–6.8 seconds. The range varies from 602 to 806 km.

The powertrain received a major refresh alongside when the vehicle was renamed to the Lynk & Co 10. Standard models receive a more powerful 402 hp (300 kW; 408 PS) motor and are equipped with 800-volt class power electronics, allowing the 77.17 kWh LFP battery pack supplied by Quzhou Jidian (part of Geely's Viridi E-Mobility Technology (VREMT)) to provide 701 km (436 mi) of CLTC range and 6C recharging from 10–80% in 10.5 minutes. The all-wheel drive 10+ variant gets updated front and rear motors for a total of 912 horsepower (680 kW; 925 PS) and a 0–100 km/h (62 mph) acceleration time of 3.2 seconds. The Ultra Long Range variant is equipped with a new Megawatt Charging 95 kWh LFP battery pack also supplied by VREMT and paired with 900-volt power electronics, which allows for 12C recharging from 10–80% in 5.5 minutes and a CLTC range of 816 kilometres (507 mi).

Specifications
Model	Battery		Motor		Power	Torque	Range	10–80% charge	0–100 km/h (62 mph)	Top speed	Kerb weight
Model	Type	Weight	Front	Rear	Power	Torque	CLTC	10–80% charge	0–100 km/h (62 mph)	Top speed	Kerb weight
Z10 RWD	71 kWh LFP VREMT		—	200 kW TZ220XSA01 PMSM	268 hp (200 kW; 272 PS)	343 N⋅m (253 lb⋅ft)	602 km (374 mi)	27 min	6.8 s	210 km/h (130 mph)	2,098 kg (4,625 lb)
Z10 RWD Long range	95 kWh LFP VREMT		—	200 kW TZ220XSA01 PMSM	268 hp (200 kW; 272 PS)	343 N⋅m (253 lb⋅ft)	766 km (476 mi)	27 min	6.8 s	210 km/h (130 mph)	2,275 kg (5,016 lb)
Z10 RWD 800V	95 kWh LFP VREMT		—	310 kW TZ235XYC01 PMSM	416 hp (310 kW; 422 PS)	440 N⋅m (325 lb⋅ft)	806 km (501 mi)	15 min	5.9 s	240 km/h (149 mph)	2,318 kg (5,110 lb)
Z10 AWD	95 kWh LFP VREMT		270 kW YS235XYG01 induction	310 kW TZ235XYC01 PMSM	778 hp (580 kW; 789 PS)	810 N⋅m (597 lb⋅ft)	702 km (436 mi)	15 min	3.5 s	250 km/h (155 mph)	2,468 kg (5,441 lb)
Z10 AWD Starbuff	95 kWh LFP VREMT		270 kW YS235XYG01 induction	310 kW TZ235XYC01 PMSM	778 hp (580 kW; 789 PS)	810 N⋅m (597 lb⋅ft)	680 km (423 mi)	15 min	3.5 s	250 km/h (155 mph)	2,535 kg (5,589 lb)
10 Long range	77.17 kWh LFP VREMT	576 kg (1,270 lb)	—	300 kW TZ220XYC03 PMSM	402 hp (300 kW; 408 PS)	373 N⋅m (275 lb⋅ft)	701 km (436 mi)	10.5 min	5.9 s	220 km/h (137 mph)	2,148 kg (4,736 lb)
10+ AWD	77.17 kWh LFP VREMT	576 kg (1,270 lb)	310 kW YS220XYG01 induction	370 kW TZ230XYC04 PMSM	912 hp (680 kW; 925 PS)	913 N⋅m (673 lb⋅ft)	536 km (333 mi)	10.5 min	3.2 s	240 km/h (149 mph)	2,317 kg (5,108 lb)
10 Ultra long range	95 kWh LFP VREMT	712 kg (1,570 lb)	—	370 kW TZ230XYC04 PMSM	496 hp (370 kW; 503 PS)	535 N⋅m (395 lb⋅ft)	816 km (507 mi)	5.5 min	5.2 s	240 km/h (149 mph)	2,287 kg (5,042 lb)

=== Sales ===
Year	China
2024	5,442
2025	5,086

== Lynk & Co 10 (PHEV, P372, 2025) ==
Lynk & Co 10
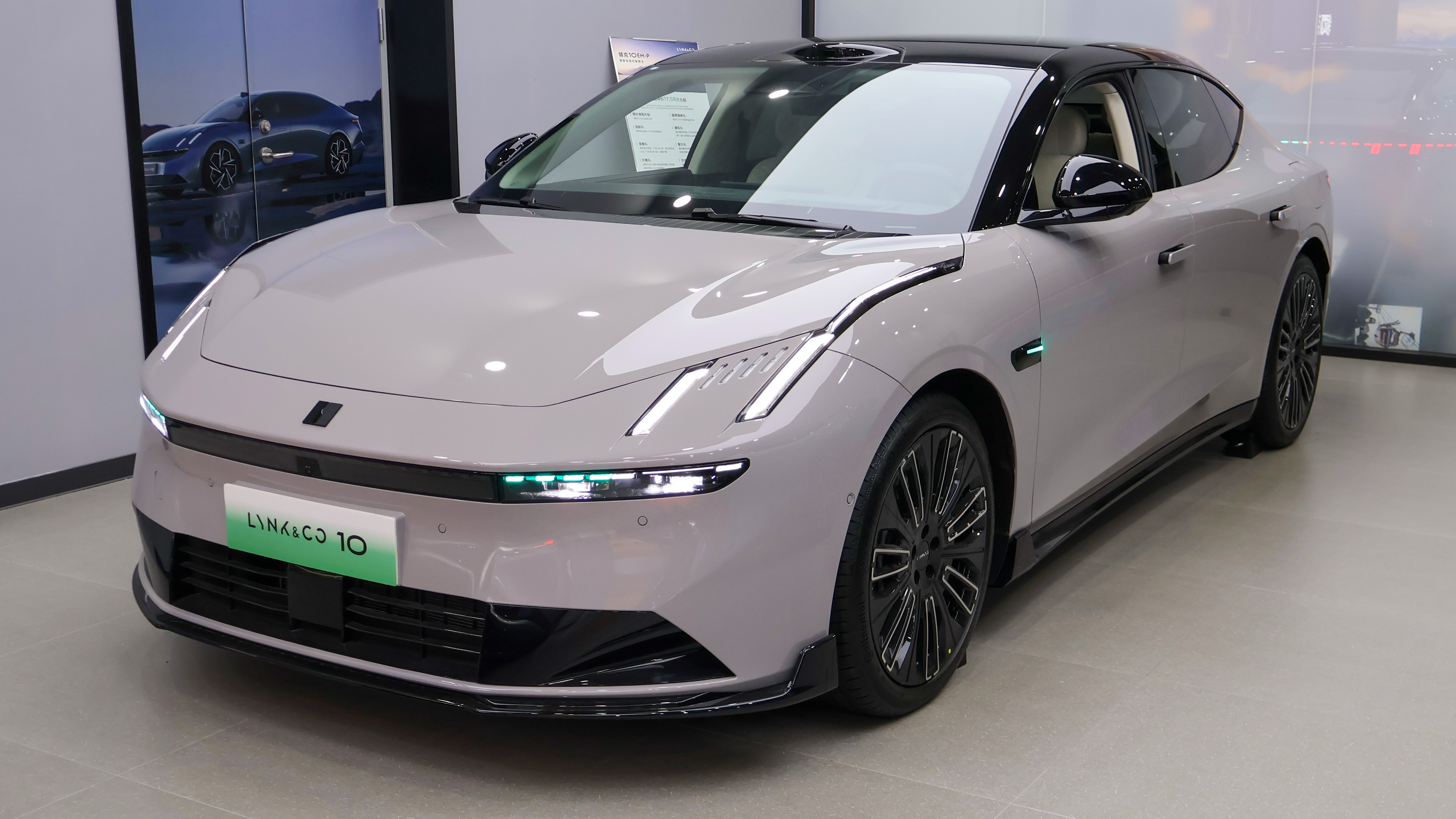

Overview
- Model code: P372
- Production: 2025–present
- Assembly: China

Body and chassis
- Layout: Front-engine, dual-motor, all-wheel-drive
- Platform: Global Energy Architecture Evo
- Related: Geely Galaxy Starshine 8; Geely Galaxy M9

Powertrain
- Engine: Gasoline plug-in hybrid: 1.5 L BHE15-CFZ turbo I4
- Power output: 523 hp (390 kW; 530 PS)
- Transmission: 3-speed DHT
- Hybrid drivetrain: Series-parallel (PHEV)
- Battery: 18.4 kWh LFP CATL; 38.2 kWh LFP
- Electric range: 100–192 km (62–119 mi) (WLTP); 120–240 km (75–149 mi) (CLTC)

Dimensions
- Wheelbase: 3,005 mm (118.3 in)
- Length: 5,050 mm (198.8 in)
- Width: 1,966 mm (77.4 in)
- Height: 1,487 mm (58.5 in)
- Curb weight: 2,137–2,257 kg (4,711–4,976 lb)

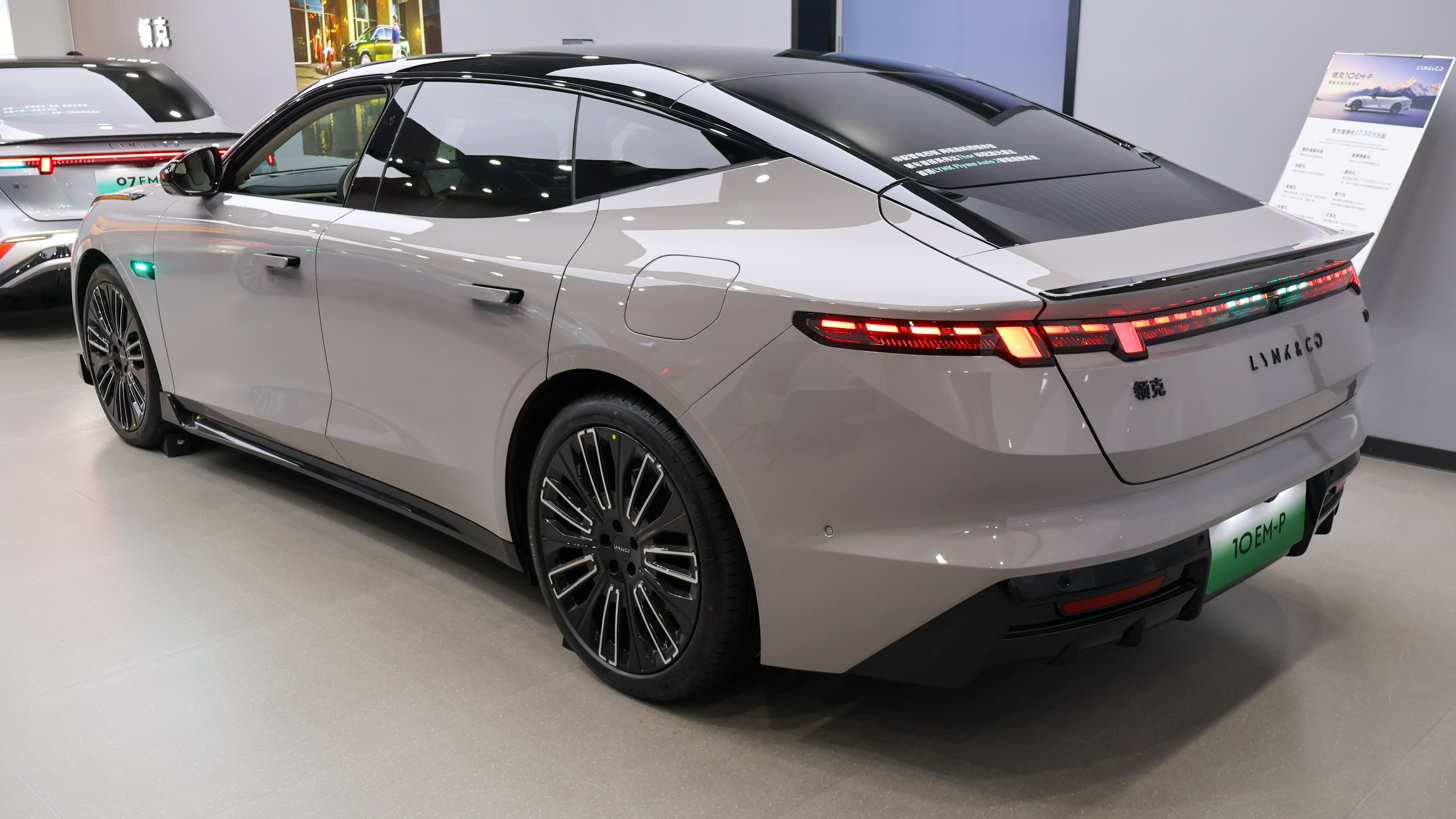
Rear view

The 10 was originally the name for the plug-in hybrid version of the Z10. It shares the GEA Evo architecture with the Geely Galaxy M9. The 10 PHEV officially launched on July 4, 2025.

=== Design ===
Just like the 10 EV, the exterior styling also follows Lynk & Co's existing The Next Day design language, including the shared daytime running lights and a rear light bar. The 10 PHEV also has retractable door handles and frameless mirrors.

=== Features ===
It uses a Qualcomm Snapdragon 8295 chipset to power the car's infotainment system and it also uses an ADAS suite powered by an Nvidia Drive Thor-U chipset, capable of 700 TOPS. The 10 range comes standard with a front double-wishbone and rear multi-link independent suspension setup and it is also equipped with CCD continuous variable damping and air suspension. LiDAR comes standard on all of the 10's trims.

=== Powertrain ===
The 10 PHEV uses the same NordThor AI Hybrid 2.0 EM-P plug-in hybrid system found in the Geely Galaxy M9. This system pairs a 1.5-liter turbocharged inline 4 codenamed BHE15-CFZ with two motors. The engine makes 161 hp (120 kW; 163 PS) and has a claimed 46.1% peak thermal efficiency. There are two LFP batteries options: a 18.4 kWh pack capable of 100 kilometres (62 mi) of WLTP electric range, and a larger 38.2 kWh pack capable of 192 kilometres (119 mi).

Specifications
Battery		Engine	Motor		System total		Electric range		30–80% charge	0–100 km/h (62 mph)	Top speed	Kerb weight
Type	Weight	Engine	Front	Rear	Power	Torque	WLTP	CLTC	30–80% charge	0–100 km/h (62 mph)	Top speed	Kerb weight
18.4 kWh LFP CATL	183 kg (403 lb)	1.5 L BHE15-CFZ turbo I4 154 hp (115 kW; 156 PS)	180 kW TZ220QY035 PMSM	90 kW YS180XS001 induction	523 hp (390 kW; 530 PS)	755 N⋅m (557 lb⋅ft)	100 km (62 mi)	120 km (75 mi)	18 min	5.9 s	210 km/h (130 mph)	2,137 kg (4,711 lb)
38.2 kWh LFP VREMT	276 kg (608 lb)	1.5 L BHE15-CFZ turbo I4 154 hp (115 kW; 156 PS)	180 kW TZ220QY035 PMSM	90 kW YS180XS001 induction	523 hp (390 kW; 530 PS)	755 N⋅m (557 lb⋅ft)	192 km (119 mi)	240 km (149 mi)	15 min	5.1 s	210 km/h (130 mph)	2,257 kg (4,976 lb)

=== Sales ===
Year	China
2025	23,097
