= Geely Galaxy Starshine 8 =

Mid-size sedan

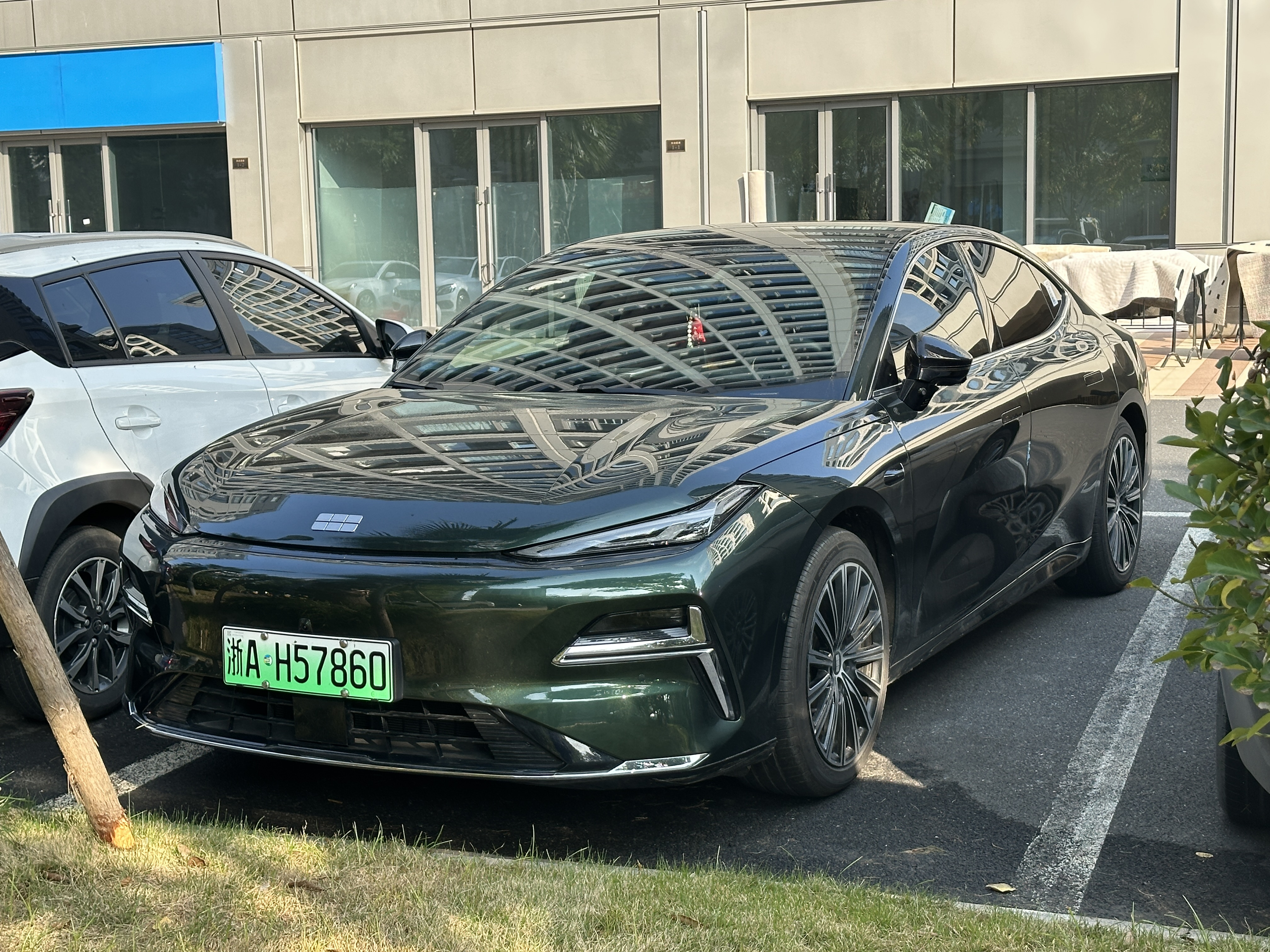

Overview
- Manufacturer: Geely Auto
- Model code: P171
- Production: 2025–present
- Assembly: China: Ningbo

Body and chassis
- Class: Executive car (E)
- Body style: 4-door fastback sedan
- Layout: Rear-motor, rear-wheel-drive (EV); Front-engine, front-motor, front-wheel-drive (PHEV)
- Platform: Global Energy Architecture Evo
- Related: Geely Galaxy E8; Geely Galaxy M9; Lynk & Co 10

Powertrain
- Engine: Petrol plug-in hybrid: 1.5 L I4
- Hybrid drivetrain: Plug-in hybrid
- Battery: EV: ? kWh LFP; PHEV: 8.5 kWh LFP 18.4 kWh LFP
- Range: 932–994 mi (1,500–1,600 km)
- Electric range: 37–81 mi (60–130 km)

Dimensions
- Wheelbase: 2,928 mm (115.3 in)
- Length: 5,018 mm (197.6 in)
- Width: 1,918 mm (75.5 in)
- Height: 1,490 mm (59 in)
- Curb weight: 2,030 kg (4,475 lb) (EV); 1,760–1,908 kg (3,880–4,206 lb) (PHEV)

The Geely Galaxy Starshine 8 (Chinese: 吉利银河星耀8; pinyin: Jílì Yínhe Xīngyào 8) is a battery electric and plug-in hybrid executive sedan manufactured by Geely Auto under the Geely Galaxy marque. It is the plug-in hybrid version of the Galaxy E8.

== Overview ==
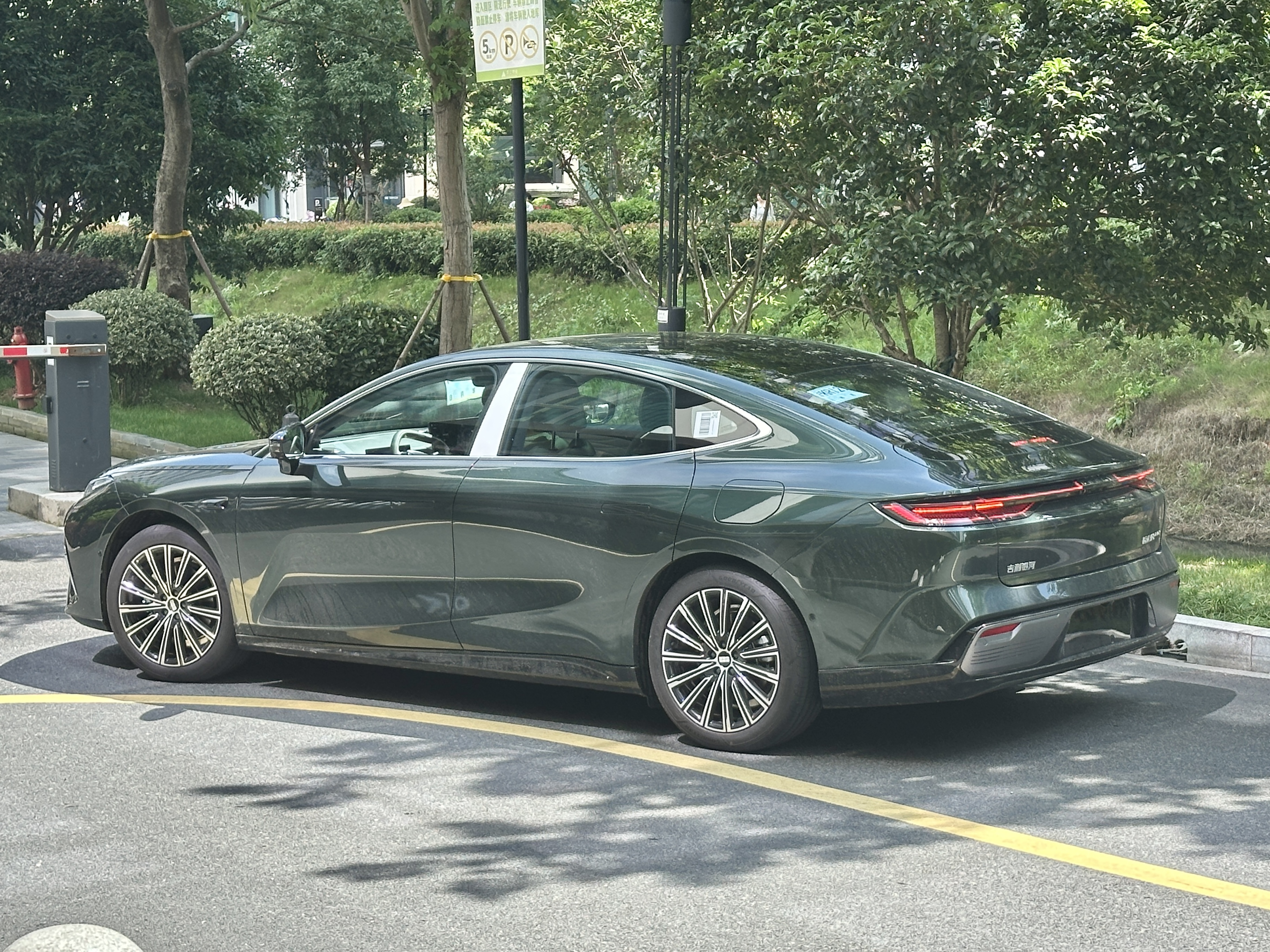
Rear view

The Galaxy Starshine 8 is a plug-in hybrid 4-door executive fastback sedan and is based on the Global Energy Architecture Evo platform. Pre-sales started on April 10, 2025. The Starshine 8 officially launched on May 10, 2025.

=== Features ===
The Starshine 8 gets a sunroof with an area of 1.36 m^{2}. It also comes with the G-pilot ADAS system which uses a roof-mounted lidar, 5 millimeter-wave radars, 10 cameras and 12 ultrasonic radars. In the interior a 10.2-inch LCD instrument panel and a 15.4-inch touchscreen are present. On some trims a 25.6-inch AR-HUD is available.

== Powertrain ==
=== Battery electric ===
The battery electric version of the Galaxy Starshine 8 was first unveiled by the MIIT in August of 2025. It uses a 250 kilowatts (340 hp; 340 PS) electric motor on Rear wheels paired with lithium iron phosphate batteries of unknown capacity.

=== Plug-in hybrid ===
The Starshine 8 uses both the Thor EM-i and the Thor EM-P plug-in hybrid systems. Unlike the Lynk & Co 10 and Galaxy M9, which use an all-wheel-drive layout, the Starshine 8 is only available with a front-wheel-drive layout. The EM-i models get a 1.5 liter naturally aspirated inline 4 engine making 110 horsepower combined with a front motor making 211 horsepower. The EM-P models use a turbocharged inline 4 of the same capacity making 161 horsepower combined with a front motor making 215 horsepower. Two batteries are available, a 8.5 kWh battery and an 18.4 kWh battery. Both batteries are LFP batteries. The 8.5 kWh battery is only available with the EM-i models. Both EM-i and EM-p models get a battery electric range of 130 kilometers, the EM-i also has an option to have a smaller battery with a 60 kilometer electric range.

The total range is estimated to be from 1500 to 1600 kilometers.

== Sales ==
Year	China
2025	57,741
