= Geely Galaxy L6 =

Plug-in hybrid compact sedan

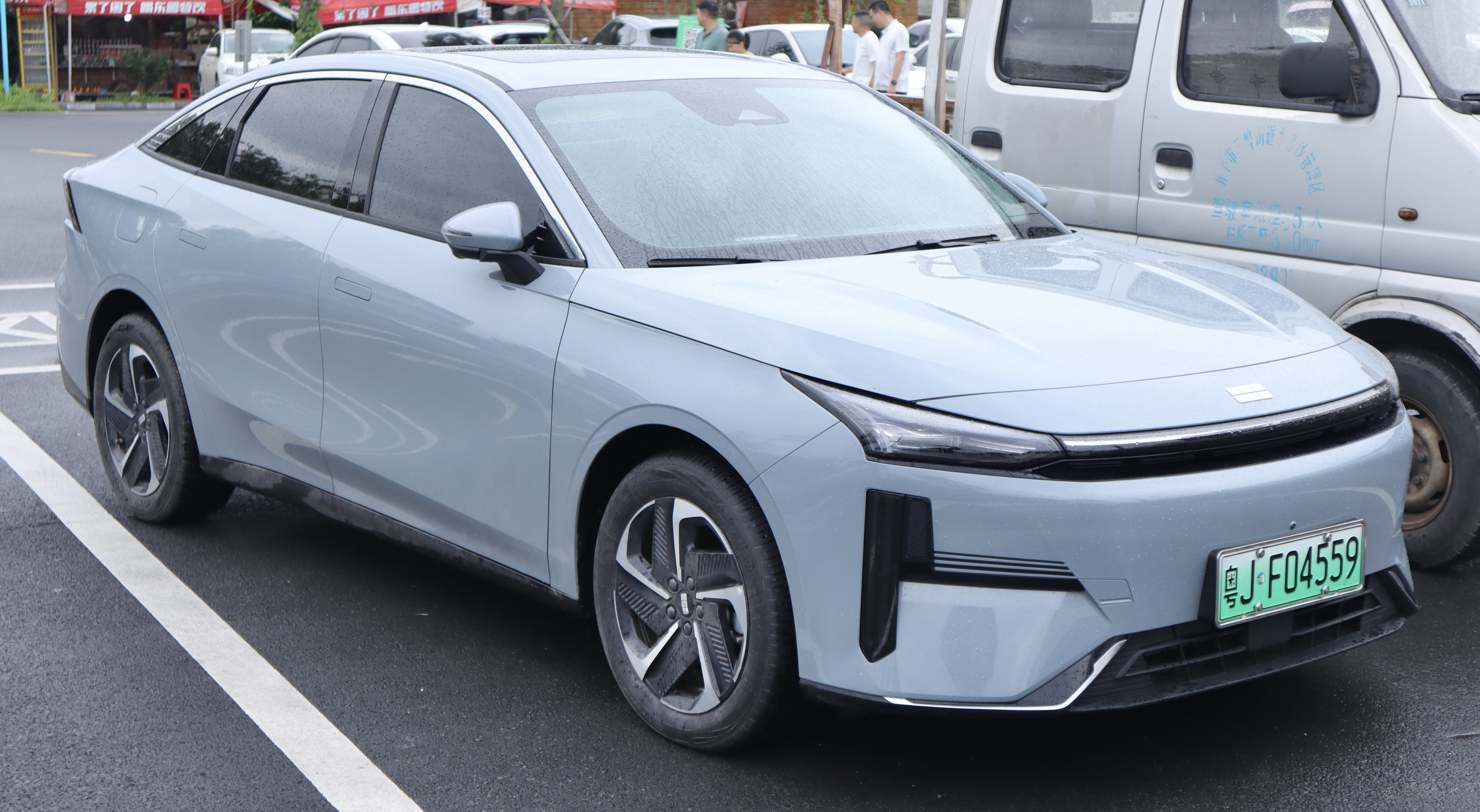

Overview
- Manufacturer: Geely Auto
- Model code: FS12
- Production: September 2023 – present
- Assembly: China: Linhai, Zhejiang

Body and chassis
- Class: Compact car (C)
- Body style: 4-door fastback sedan
- Layout: Front-engine + front-motor, front-wheel-drive
- Platform: Compact Modular Architecture
- Related: Geely Galaxy L7

Powertrain
- Engine: Petrol plug-in hybrid: 1.5 L BHE15-BFN I4; 1.5 L BHE15-BFZ turbo I4
- Electric motor: Permanent magnet synchronous
- Power output: 160–287 kW (215–385 hp; 218–390 PS)
- Transmission: 3-speed NordThor DHT
- Battery: 8.5 kWh LFP CALB; 9.1 kWh LFP SVOLT; 18.7 kWh LFP SVOLT; 19.1 kWh LFP SVOLT
- Range: 1,370 km (850 mi); 2,000 km (1,200 mi) (EM-i)
- Electric range: 48–115 km (30–71 mi) (CLTC)

Dimensions
- Wheelbase: 2,752 mm (108.3 in)
- Length: 4,782 mm (188.3 in)
- Width: 1,875 mm (73.8 in)
- Height: 1,489 mm (58.6 in)
- Curb weight: 1,680–1,750 kg (3,700–3,860 lb); 1,570–1,700 kg (3,460–3,750 lb) (EM-i)

The Geely Galaxy L6 (Chinese: 吉利银河L6; pinyin: Jílì Yínhé L6) is a plug-in hybrid compact sedan manufactured by the Chinese car manufacturer Geely Auto under the Geely Galaxy marque. The L6 is Geely Galaxy's second model, following the L7 SUV.

== Overview ==
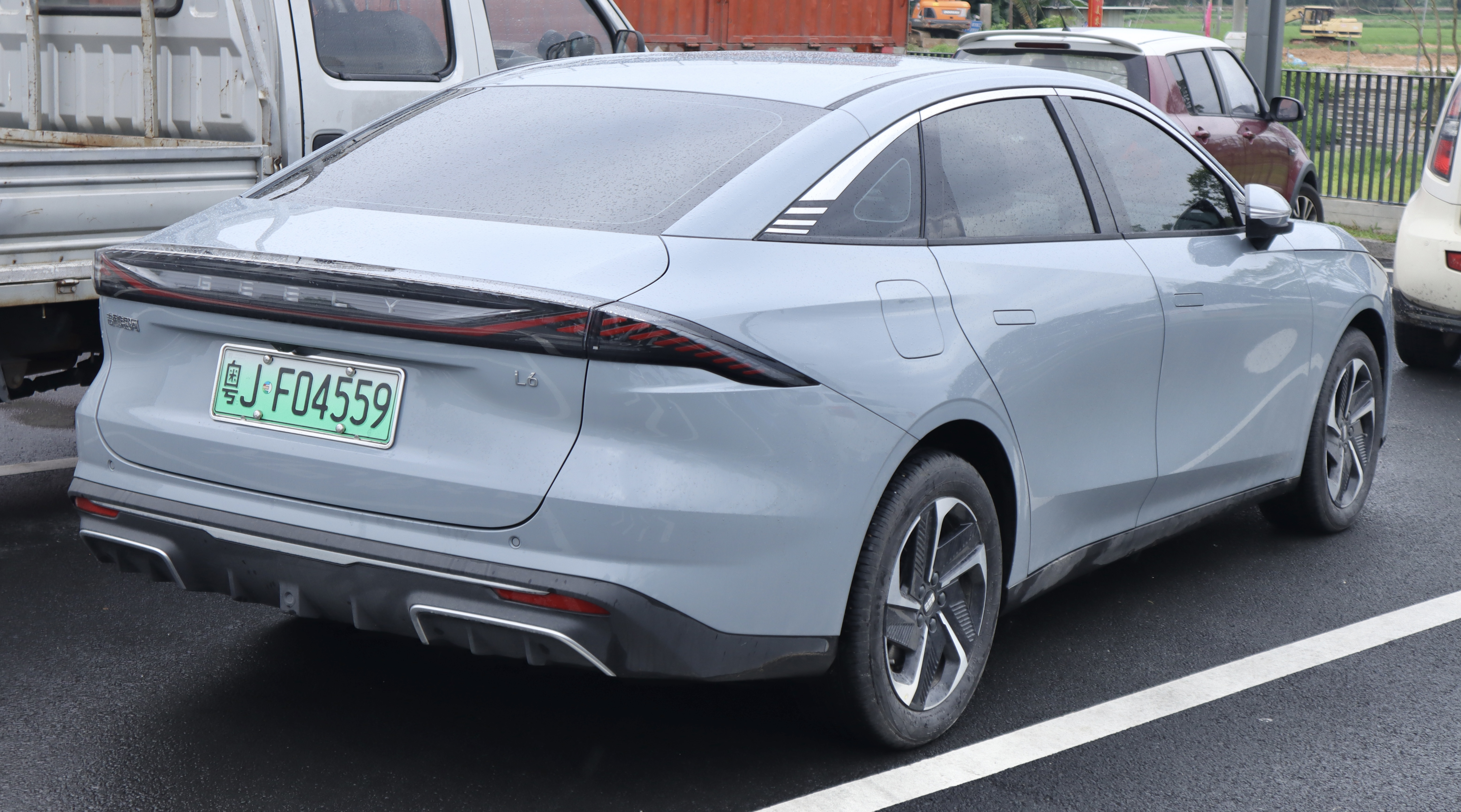
Rear view

The Geely Galaxy L6 shares the same NordThor Hybrid 8848 powertrain as the L7, combining a 1.5-litre turbocharged petrol engine mated to a 3-speed DHT, as well as a front-mounted electric motor. The L6 also shares the same Compact Modular Architecture platform as the L7, along with other Geely vehicles.

The interior of the L6 features a 10.25″ LCD screen behind the steering wheel serving as an instrument panel. A vertically-oriented 13.2″ screen occupies the centre console and serves as a control centre for the vehicles infotainment system. The Geely Galaxy is equipped with the Qualcomm Snapdragon 8155 processor and runs on the Geely Galaxy N-OS operating system.

=== 2025 EM-i refresh ===
On February 12, 2025 Geely introduced the refreshed L6, called the L6 EM-i, with a new powertrain and updated interior, with deliveries beginning on February 23. It uses the NordThor 2.0 (Leishen 2.0) plug-in hybrid powertrain introduced with the Starship 7, using a naturally aspirated engine rather than a turbocharged unit, with the intention of better competing with the BYD Qin L DM-i's DM-i 5.0 powertrain.

The exterior retains the same dimensions and features few changes other than a change to traditional loop-style door handles. The interior features several changes, including a new two-tone two-spoke steering wheel, and a new center console design. The central infotainment display is now a horizontally-oriented 14.6-inch screen, below which is a pair of air vents and two wireless charging pads and a panel containing a rotary control dial and other controls.

== Powertrain ==
The L6's 1.5-litre turbocharged petrol engine is capable of putting out 120 kW (161 hp; 163 PS) and 225 N⋅m (166 lb⋅ft) torque, while the electric motor puts out 107 kW (143 hp; 145 PS) and 338 N⋅m (249 lb⋅ft) torque. This setup provides a system combined power of 287 kW (385 hp; 390 PS) and 535 N⋅m (395 lb⋅ft) torque, and allows the L6 to achieve a 0–100 km/h (62 mph) acceleration time of 6.5 seconds, as well as a top speed of 235 km/h (146 mph).

There are two battery size options available for the Geely Galaxy L6: 9.1 or 18.7 kWh. The 9.1 kWh battery allows the vehicle to reach a total combined range of 1,320 km (820 mi) on the WLTP cycle, while the 18.7 kWh option can reach 1,370 km (851 mi).

The L6 EM-i uses the NordThor 2.0 (Leishen 2.0) plug-in hybrid system with two battery options. It consists of a 1.5-liter naturally aspirated four-cylinder outputting 82 kW (110 hp; 111 PS) and 136 N⋅m (100 lb⋅ft) of torque, paired with a DHT transmission with an integrated P3 motor outputting 160 kW (215 hp; 218 PS) and 262 N⋅m (193 lb⋅ft) of torque, which is also the peak system power. Power is supplied by either a CALB-supplied 8.5 kWh pack, or a SVOLT-supplied 19.1 kWh pack, providing CLTC electric range ratings of 48 km (30 mi) and 115 km (71 mi), respectively, and a combined range of 1,300 km (808 mi). The version with the smaller battery has a 0–100 km/h (62 mph) acceleration time of 7.4 seconds, while both versions have a top speed of 180 km/h (112 mph).

== Specifications ==
Battery	Engine			Motor		Total system		Range		Kerb weight	0–100 km/h (62 mph)	Top speed
Battery	Type	Power @rpm	Torque @rpm	Power	Torque	Power	Torque	Electric	Combined	Kerb weight	0–100 km/h (62 mph)	Top speed
9.12 kWh LFP SVOLT	BHE15-BFZ 1.5L turbo I4 DOHC GDI η: 44.3%	120 kW (161 hp; 163 PS) @5,500	225 N⋅m (166 lb⋅ft) @2,500-4,000	107 kW (143 hp; 145 PS)	338 N⋅m (249 lb⋅ft)	287 kW (385 hp; 390 PS)	535 N⋅m (395 lb⋅ft)	48 km (30 mi)	1,320 km (820 mi)	1,680 kg (3,700 lb)	6.5 s	235 km/h (146 mph)
18.74 kWh LFP SVOLT	BHE15-BFZ 1.5L turbo I4 DOHC GDI η: 44.3%	120 kW (161 hp; 163 PS) @5,500	225 N⋅m (166 lb⋅ft) @2,500-4,000	107 kW (143 hp; 145 PS)	338 N⋅m (249 lb⋅ft)	287 kW (385 hp; 390 PS)	535 N⋅m (395 lb⋅ft)	105 km (65 mi)	1,370 km (850 mi)	1,750 kg (3,860 lb)	6.5 s	235 km/h (146 mph)
EM-i
8.5 kWh LFP CALB	BHE15-BFN 1.5L I4 DOHC MPFI CR: 14:1 η: 46.5%	82 kW (110 hp; 111 PS) @6,000	136 N⋅m (100 lb⋅ft) @4,000-5,000	160 kW (215 hp; 218 PS)	262 N⋅m (193 lb⋅ft)	160 kW (215 hp; 218 PS)	262 N⋅m (193 lb⋅ft)	48 km (30 mi)	—	1,570 kg (3,460 lb)	7.4 s	180 km/h (112 mph)
19.1 kWh LFP SVOLT	BHE15-BFN 1.5L I4 DOHC MPFI CR: 14:1 η: 46.5%	82 kW (110 hp; 111 PS) @6,000	136 N⋅m (100 lb⋅ft) @4,000-5,000	160 kW (215 hp; 218 PS)	262 N⋅m (193 lb⋅ft)	160 kW (215 hp; 218 PS)	262 N⋅m (193 lb⋅ft)	115 km (71 mi)	1,300 km (808 mi)	1,700 kg (3,750 lb)	—	180 km/h (112 mph)

== Sales ==
Year	China
2023	17,250
2024	57,028
2025	43,596
