= Geely Galaxy Cruiser 700 =

Plug-in hybrid mid-size SUV

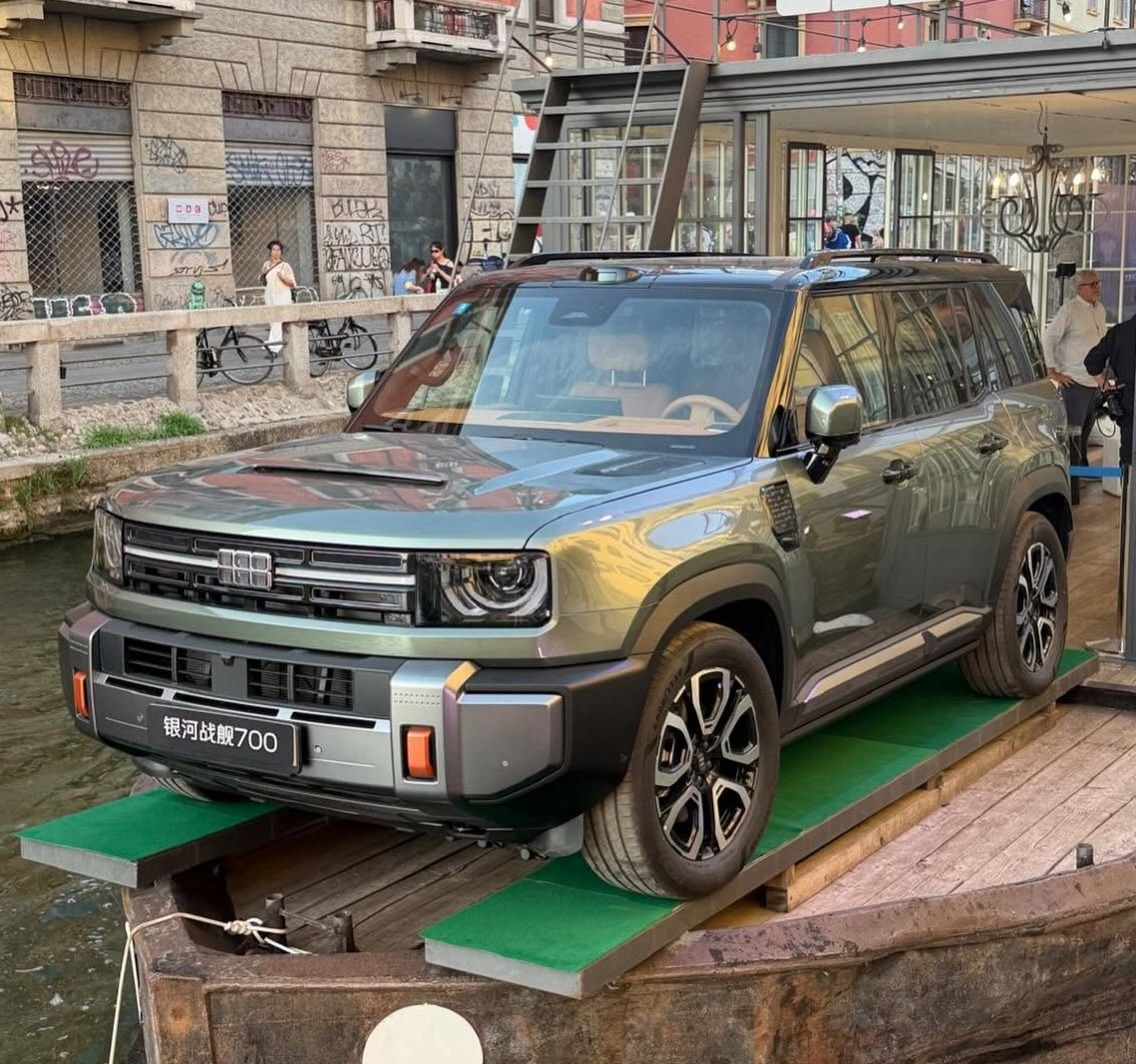

Overview
- Manufacturer: Geely Auto
- Model code: KO11
- Also called: Geely Battleship 700
- Production: 2026–present
- Assembly: China
- Designer: Flavien Dachet

Body and chassis
- Class: Mid-size SUV (D)
- Body style: 5-door SUV
- Layout: Front-engine, front-motor, front-wheel-drive; Front-engine, tri-motor, all-wheel-drive
- Platform: Geely GTA (Geely Terrain Architecture)

Powertrain
- Engine: 1.5 L BHE15-CFZ I4 I4; 2.0 L BHE20-EFZ turbo I4
- Electric motor: PMSM
- Power output: 469–1,113 hp (350–830 kW; 476–1,128 PS)
- Transmission: 3-speed 3DHT200 DHT
- Hybrid drivetrain: Series-parallel (plug-in hybrid)
- Battery: 47.14 kWh Golden Short Blade LFP CATL
- Range: 1,420–1,700 km (882–1,056 mi) (CLTC)
- Electric range: 165–185 km (103–115 mi) (WLTP); 270–305 km (168–190 mi) (CLTC)

Dimensions
- Wheelbase: 2,900 mm (114.2 in)
- Length: 5,085 mm (200.2 in)
- Width: 1,999 mm (78.7 in)
- Height: 1,895 mm (74.6 in)

The Geely Galaxy Cruiser 700 (Chinese: 吉利银河战舰700; pinyin: Jílì Yínhé Zhànjiàn 700) is a plug-in hybrid mid-size SUV produced by the Geely Group and marketed under the Geely Galaxy marque.

== Overview ==
The Galaxy Cruiser 700 was directly previewed by the Geely Galaxy Cruiser at the 2025 Shanghai Auto Show on April 28, 2025. It will compete with the Fangchengbao Bao 5 and the Deepal G318. On January 16, 2026, Geely confirmed to British automotive magazine Auto Express that the United Kingdom will be the first export country to get the Cruiser 700. A global naming contest began on March 10, 2026, with a teaser image posted on the same day. Geely also shared a video of the Cruiser 700 undergoing winter testing exactly a week before.

Geely confirmed on March 20, 2026, that the production version of the Galaxy Cruiser would use the Geely Galaxy Cruiser 700 ("吉利银河战舰700; Jílì Yínhé Zhànjiàn 700") name, carrying over the name from the concept but adding the 700 suffix. The name was selected from more than 50,000 user-selected name proposals.

The Galaxy Cruiser 700 was unveiled on 24 July 2026.

Geely Galaxy says that the Cruiser 700 has 2,200 megapascals (320 ksi) reinforcements and a tortional rigidity of 44,000Nm/° and its roof can withstand a 161 kN (36,000 lb_{f}) roof crush test.

=== Design ===
The Galaxy Cruiser 700 has short front and rear overhangs and flared rear fenders and has been compared to the L663 Land Rover Defender. It uses traditional door handles, as well as large headlights and taillights. The daytime running lights of the concept version are designed to look like angry eyes and were inspired by dancing dragons.

=== Features ===
The Cruiser 700 has a large central touchscreen and a digital instrument cluster using a liquid crystal display. It does not use a heads-up display. A rear-mounted spare tire is present on the tailgate. The concept version also features a small storage container mounted towards the back of the car on the passenger side and a ladder on the driver's side. It has a swimming mode that enables it to cross small bodies of water at up to 7 km/h (4.3 mph) for up to 40 minutes, and it has a wading depth of up to 800 mm (31.5 in) which can be monitored using its two wading depth sensors.

It has approach and departure angles of 30° and 31°, respectively, and a ground clearance of 233 mm (9.2 in). It is capable of a turning radius of 3.36 m (11.0 ft) when using the tank turn mode.

It is available with two different optional Level 2 ADAS systems, both of which have a sensor suite consisting of a 192-line Hesai-supplied roof-mounted LiDAR, 3 mmWave radars, 11 cameras, and 12 ultrasonic sensors. The Qianli Haohan H5 system uses an Nvidia Orin-Y chip capable of around 200 TOPS of performance, while the Qianli Haohan H7 system uses an Nvidia Thor-U chip capable of 700 TOPS; both are capable of assisted driving in highway and urban conditions.

== Powertrain ==
The Cruiser 700 uses a plug-in hybrid system and its battery is expected to have a capacity of at least 50 kWh. It uses a tri-motor, all-wheel-drive system, an AI chassis that can support functions such as U-turning, wading detection, and driving with punctured tires. It also has a wading depth of 800 mm (31 in) and is equipped with Geely's EEA 4.0 electronic architecture.

All versions of the Cruiser 700 are equipped with the Thor EM-T plug-in hybrid system, and uses a 47.14 kWh LFP battery pack supplied by CATL using Geely VREMT's Short Blade Aegis cell technology which is capable recharging from 10–70% in 8 minutes and 25 seconds and 10–80% in 10 minutes.

The standard Cruiser 700 is equipped with a 1.5-liter turbocharged inline-4 petrol engine outputting 154 hp (115 kW; 156 PS) (161 hp (120 kW; 163 PS) gross) and 255 N⋅m (188 lb⋅ft) of torque, and is paired with a front motor outputting 308 hp (230 kW; 312 PS) and 350 N⋅m (258 lb⋅ft) of torque. They are connected through a 3-speed DHT series-parallel transmission and outputs 469 hp (350 kW; 476 PS) and 605 N⋅m (446 lb⋅ft) of torque and drive only the front wheels. It has a WLTP electric range rating of 185 km (115 mi) and CLTC rating of 305 km (190 mi), and a combined range of 1,770 km (1,100 mi).

The lower tri-motor all-wheel drive variant uses the same engine and front motor and adds two motors outputting 228 hp (170 kW; 231 PS) and 280 N⋅m (207 lb⋅ft) of torque to individually each rear wheel, for a total system output of 764 hp (570 kW; 775 PS) and 1,165 N⋅m (859 lb⋅ft) of torque. It has an electric range of 170 and 280 km (106 and 174 mi) on the WLTP and CLTC cycles, respectively and a combined range of 1,520 km (944 mi) CLTC. It is equipped with a crawl mode and is capable of tank turning.

The top variant uses the same front motor and transmission but uses a larger 2.0-liter turbocharged inline-4 petrol engine outputting 208 hp (155 kW; 211 PS) (214 hp (160 kW; 217 PS) gross) and 360 N⋅m (266 lb⋅ft) of torque. It uses 295 hp (220 kW; 299 PS) motors outputting 310 N⋅m (229 lb⋅ft) of torque to individually drive each rear wheel, for a total system output of 1,113 hp (830 kW; 1,128 PS) and 1,330 N⋅m (981 lb⋅ft) of torque. It is equipped with a low-range four-wheel drive mode and a rear-axle differential locker, and uses double-wishbone independent rear suspension rather than five-link independent suspension on other variants. It has an electric range of 165 and 270 km (103 and 168 mi) on the WLTP and CLTC cycles, respectively and a combined range of 1,470 km (913 mi) CLTC.

Specifications
Battery		Engine			Motor			System total		Electric range		DC charging	0–100 km/h (62 mph)	Top speed	Kerb weight
Type	Weight	Type	Power	Torque	Type	Power	Torque	Power	Torque	WLTP	CLTC	10–80% time	0–100 km/h (62 mph)	Top speed	Kerb weight
47.14 kWh Aegis Short Blade LFP CATL	316 kg (697 lb)	1.5 L BHE15-CFZ turbo I4	115 kW (154 hp; 156 PS) @ 5,000 rpm	255 N⋅m (188 lb⋅ft) at 2,500–3,500 rpm	Front: 230 kW PMSM	230 kW (308 hp; 313 PS)	350 N⋅m (258 lb⋅ft)	469 hp (350 kW; 476 PS)	605 N⋅m (446 lb⋅ft)	185 km (115 mi)	305 km (190 mi)	10 min	6.4 sec	200 km/h (124 mph)	2,405 kg (5,302 lb)
47.14 kWh Aegis Short Blade LFP CATL	316 kg (697 lb)	1.5 L BHE15-CFZ turbo I4	115 kW (154 hp; 156 PS) @ 5,000 rpm	255 N⋅m (188 lb⋅ft) at 2,500–3,500 rpm	Front: 230 kW PMSM Rear: 340 kW PMSM	570 kW (764 hp; 775 PS)	910 N⋅m (671 lb⋅ft)	925 hp (690 kW; 938 PS)	1,165 N⋅m (859 lb⋅ft)	170 km (106 mi)	280 km (174 mi)	10 min	4.2 sec	200 km/h (124 mph)	2,575 kg (5,677 lb)
47.14 kWh Aegis Short Blade LFP CATL	316 kg (697 lb)	1.5 L BHE15-CFZ turbo I4	115 kW (154 hp; 156 PS) @ 5,000 rpm	255 N⋅m (188 lb⋅ft) at 2,500–3,500 rpm	Front: 230 kW PMSM Rear: 340 kW PMSM	570 kW (764 hp; 775 PS)	910 N⋅m (671 lb⋅ft)	925 hp (690 kW; 938 PS)	1,165 N⋅m (859 lb⋅ft)	170 km (106 mi)	280 km (174 mi)	10 min	4.2 sec	200 km/h (124 mph)	2,605 kg (5,743 lb)
47.14 kWh Aegis Short Blade LFP CATL	316 kg (697 lb)	2.0 L BHE20-EFZ turbo I4	155 kW (208 hp; 211 PS)	360 N⋅m (266 lb⋅ft)	Front: 230 kW PMSM Rear: 440 kW PMSM	670 kW (898 hp; 911 PS)	1,180 N⋅m (870 lb⋅ft)	1,113 hp (830 kW; 1,128 PS)	1,330 N⋅m (981 lb⋅ft)	165 km (103 mi)	270 km (168 mi)	10 min	3.95 sec	220 km/h (137 mph)	2,750 kg (6,063 lb)

== Sales ==
Geely Galaxy said that the Cruiser 700 received over 10,000 refundable pre-order deposits within 9 minutes and over 43,900 within 1 hour of pre-sales opening on 15 September 2026. The Cruiser 700 received over 10,000 firm orders within 12 minutes of its launch on 10 October 2026.
