= Geely Galaxy =

Chinese automobile brand

- Product type: Automobiles
- Current owner: Geely Auto
- Country: China
- Introduced: February 2023; 3 years ago
- Markets: China
- Website: galaxy-geely.com

Chinese name
- Simplified Chinese: 吉利银河
- Literal meaning: Geely milky way
- Hanyu Pinyin: Jílì yínhé

Geely Galaxy (Chinese: 吉利银河; pinyin: Jílì yínhé) is a brand of Geely Auto, which is itself a subsidiary of Zhejiang Geely Holding. Unveiled in February 2023, Geely Galaxy specializes in new energy vehicles (plug-in hybrid and battery electric vehicles). Initially a product line under Geely, it was repositioned to an independent brand in 2025.

== History ==
In February 2023, at a launch event in Hangzhou, China, Geely Auto unveiled their new product line named Geely Galaxy, along with a lineup of seven vehicles to be rolled out by 2025. The product line is positioned to fill the gap between Geely's Geometry series and their premium Zeekr brand. Its first production model, the L7, was also unveiled at this event, as well as the Galaxy Light concept sedan. Pre-sales for Geely Galaxy's second model, the L6, began at the Chengdu Auto Show in August 2023. Geely Galaxy's third model, the E8, which bears a heavy resemblance to the Galaxy Light concept shown at the launch event, was officially launched in January 2024.

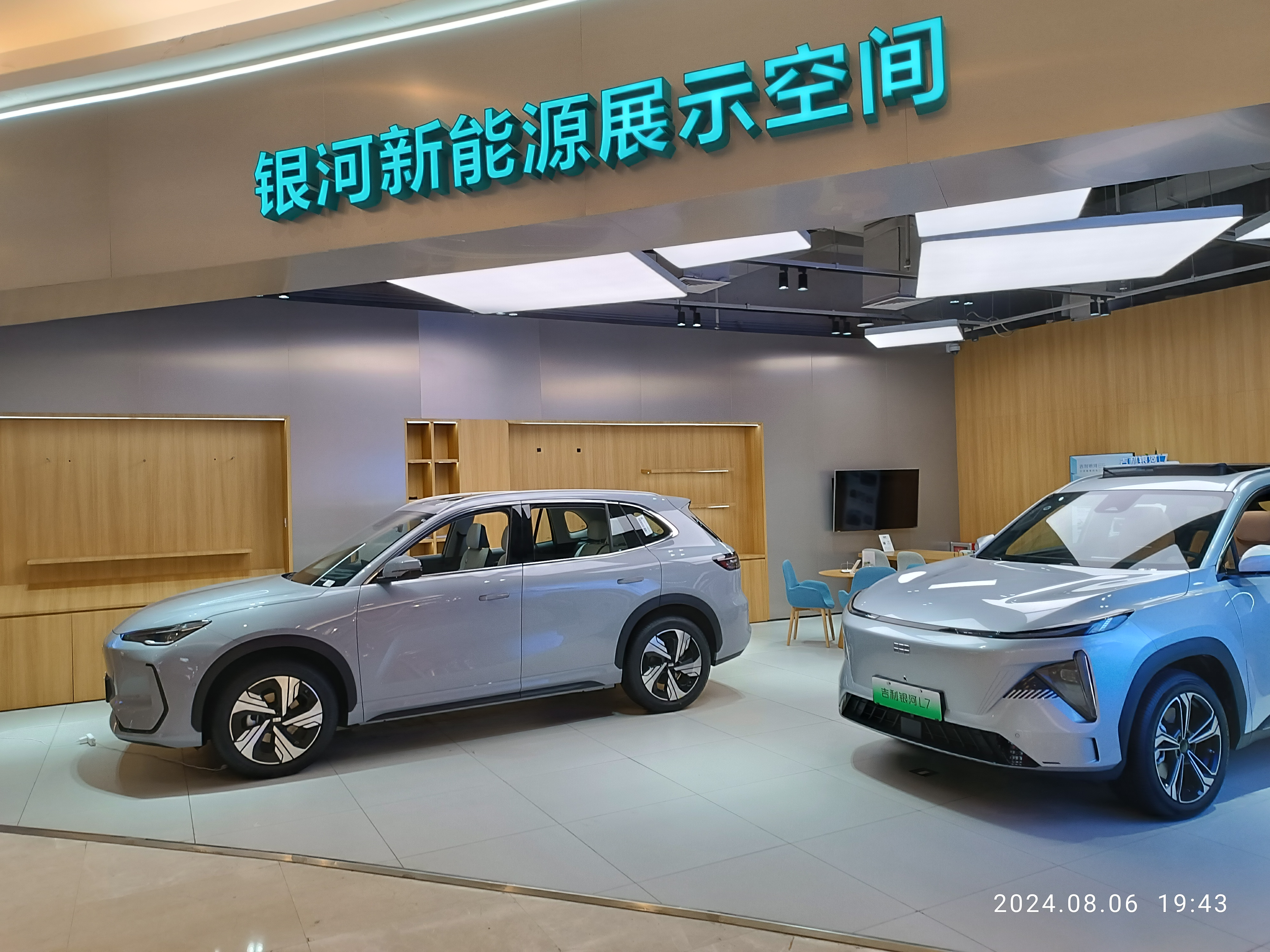
A Geely Galaxy showroom in Zhongshan, Guangdong

In 2024, three models were added to the Geely Galaxy line-up, starting from the Geely Galaxy E5 battery electric SUV, the related Geely Galaxy Starship 7 plug-in hybrid SUV, and the Geely Xingyuan. During the launch of the Geely Xingyuan in October 2024, Geely Auto Group CEO Gan Jiayue announced that Geely Geometry has been merged with Geely Galaxy. Within the Geely Galaxy brand and dealership network, Geome is positioned as a "smart boutique small car series".

In February 2025, the LEVC L380 became available in Geely Galaxy dealerships. Previously, the model was only offered through LEVC dealership network.

In March 2025, Geely Galaxy was upgraded from a product line under Geely Auto into an independent brand.

== Products ==
=== Current models ===
In October 2024, Geely split the Geely Galaxy dealership network into two sales channels selling different models, which are "Network A" (Chinese: A网; pinyin: A Wǎng) and "Star Network" (Chinese: 星网; pinyin: Xīng Wǎng) (previously "Network B" until 2025).

==== Network A ====
- Geely Galaxy LEVC L380 (2025–present), MPV, BEV, available in both sales channels
  - Geely Galaxy V900 (2026–present), EREV variant
- Geely Galaxy L6 (2023–present), compact sedan, PHEV
- Geely Galaxy A7 (2025–present), mid-size sedan, PHEV/BEV
- Geely Galaxy E8 (2024–present), mid-size sedan, BEV
- Geely Galaxy E5 (2024–present), compact SUV, BEV
- Geely Galaxy M7 (2026–present), compact SUV, PHEV, refresh variant of L7
- Geely Galaxy M8 (2026–present), full-size SUV, PHEV
- Geely Galaxy M9 (2025–present), full-size SUV, PHEV
- Geely Galaxy TT (2026–present), mid-size sedan, BEV
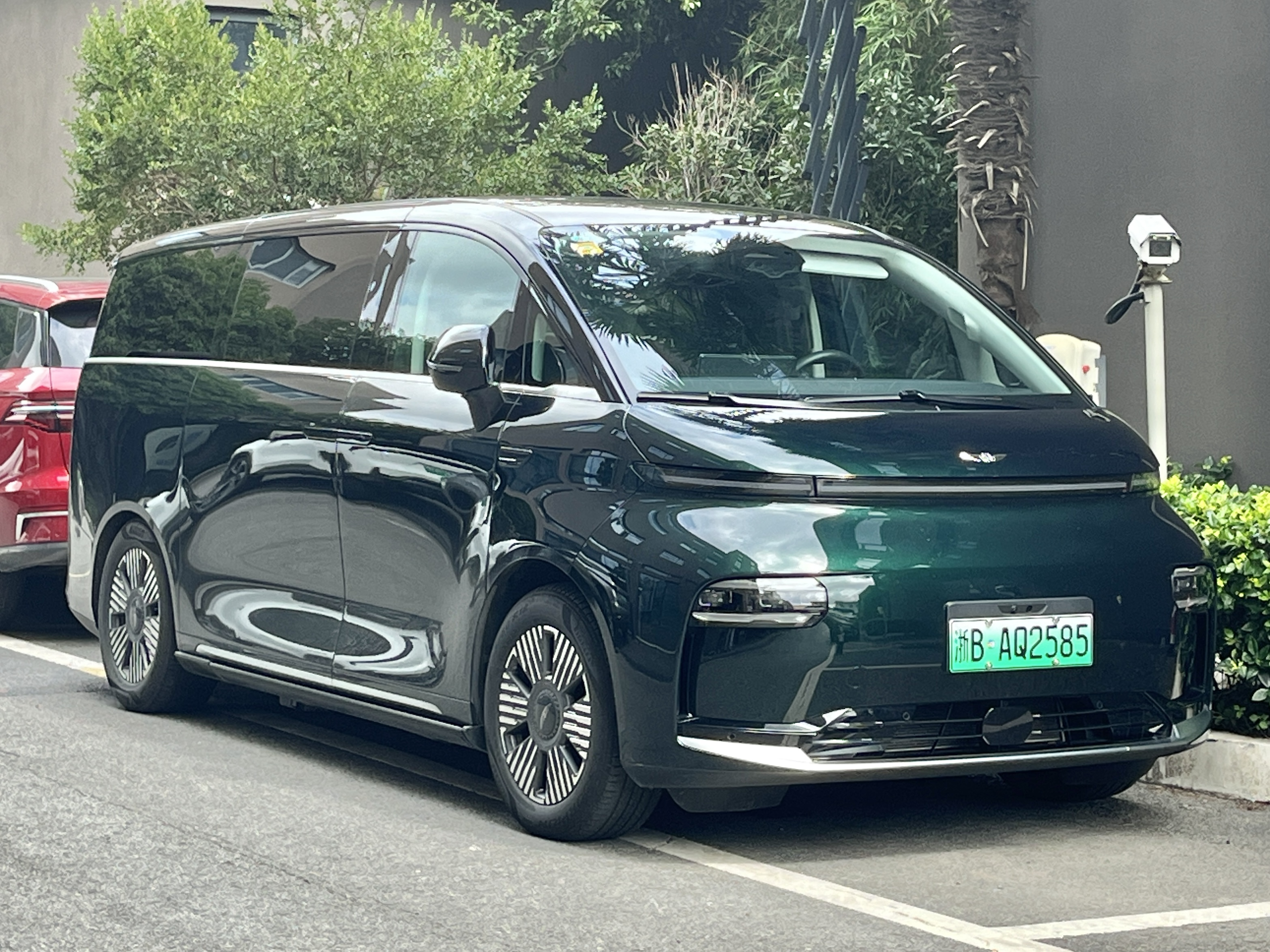
Geely Galaxy LEVC L380

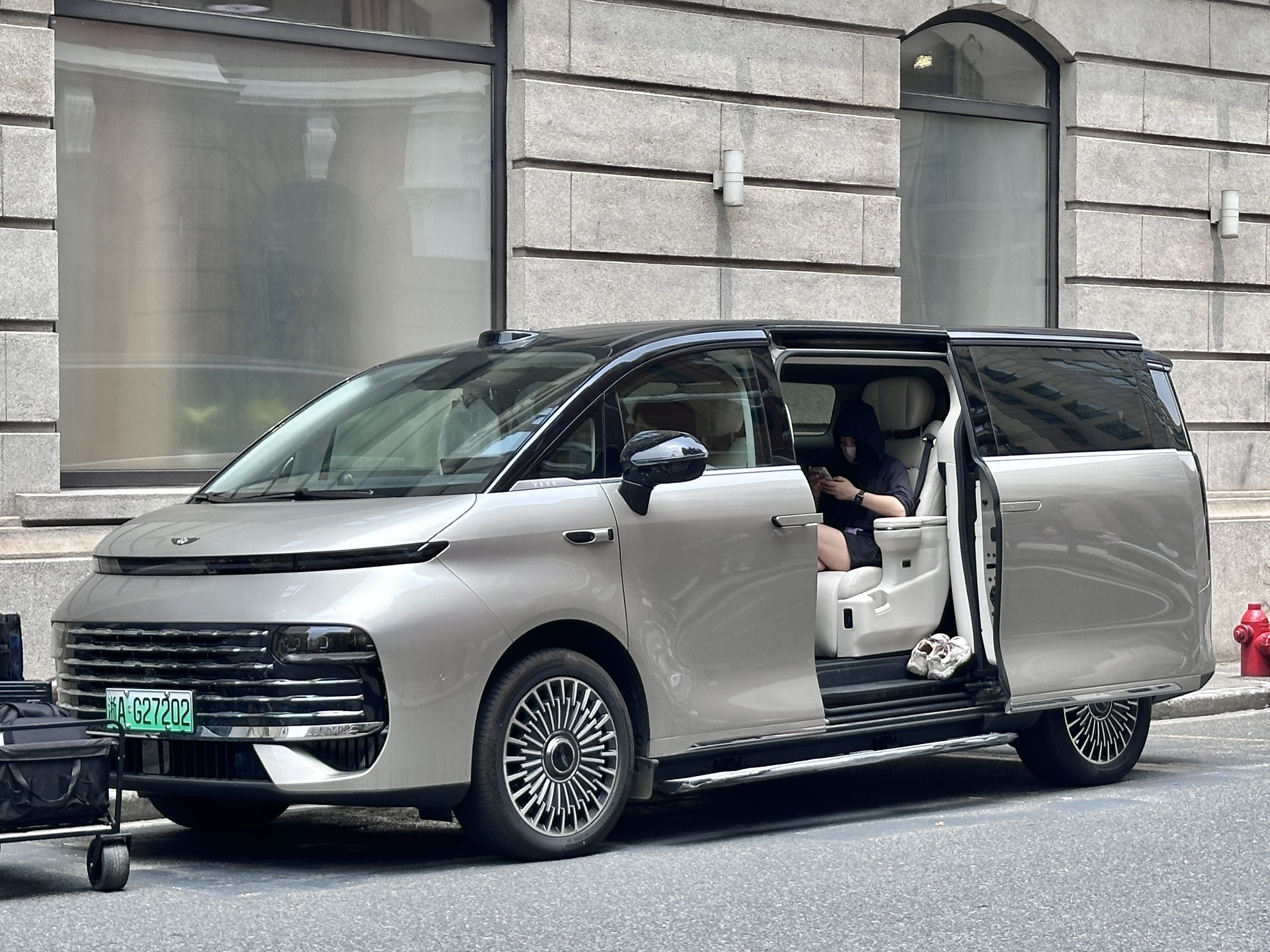
Geely Galaxy V900

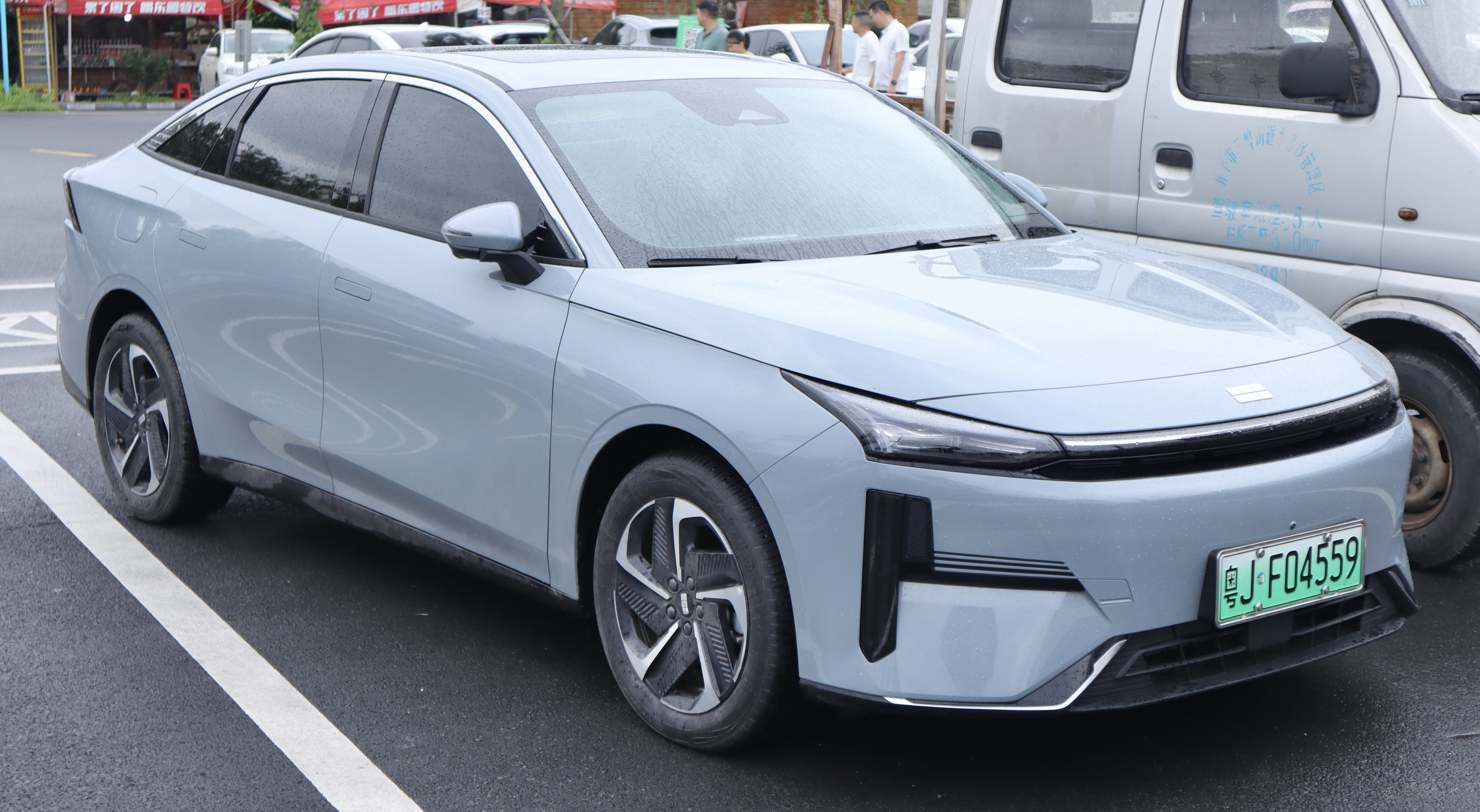
Geely Galaxy L6

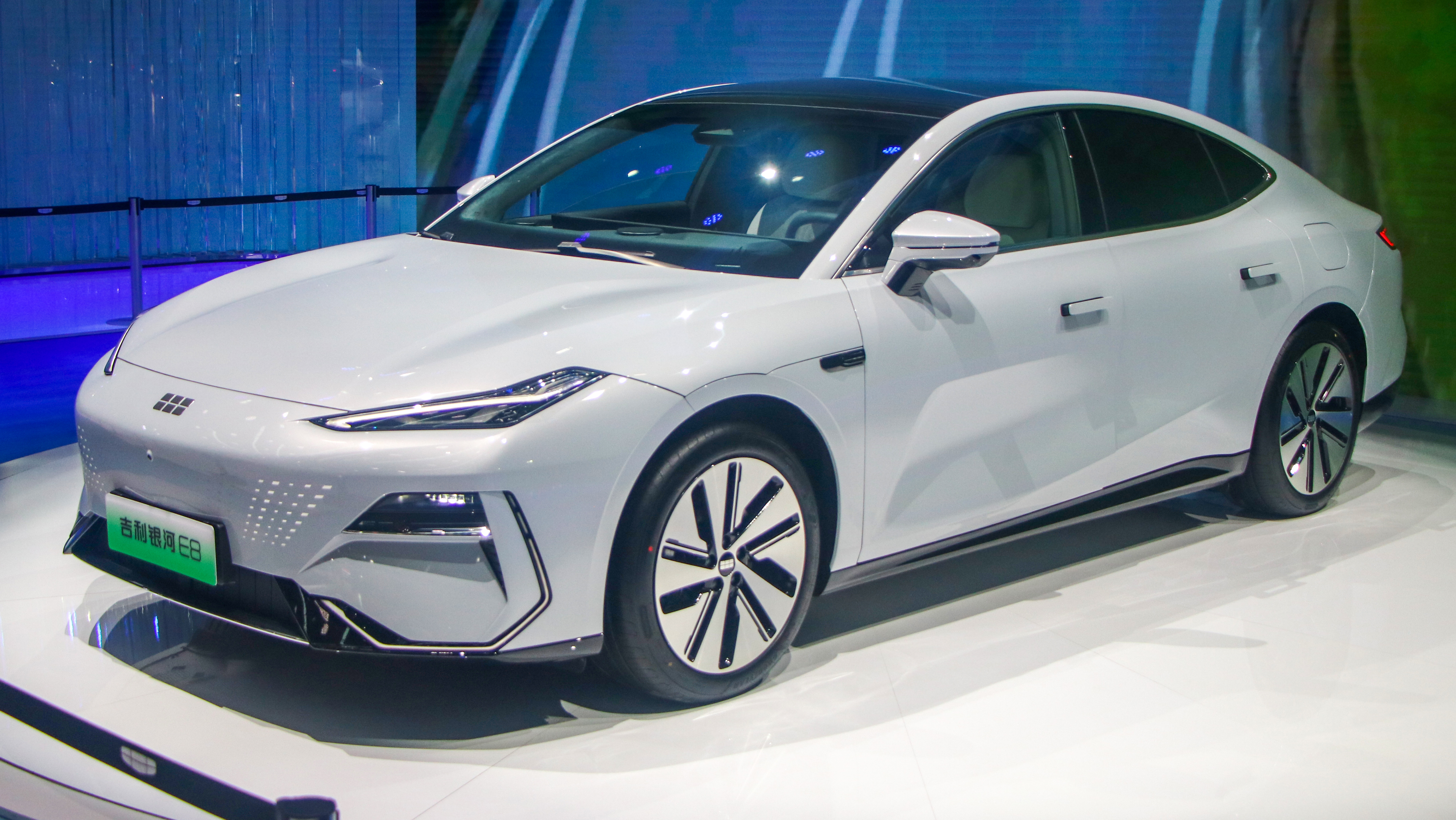
Geely Galaxy E8

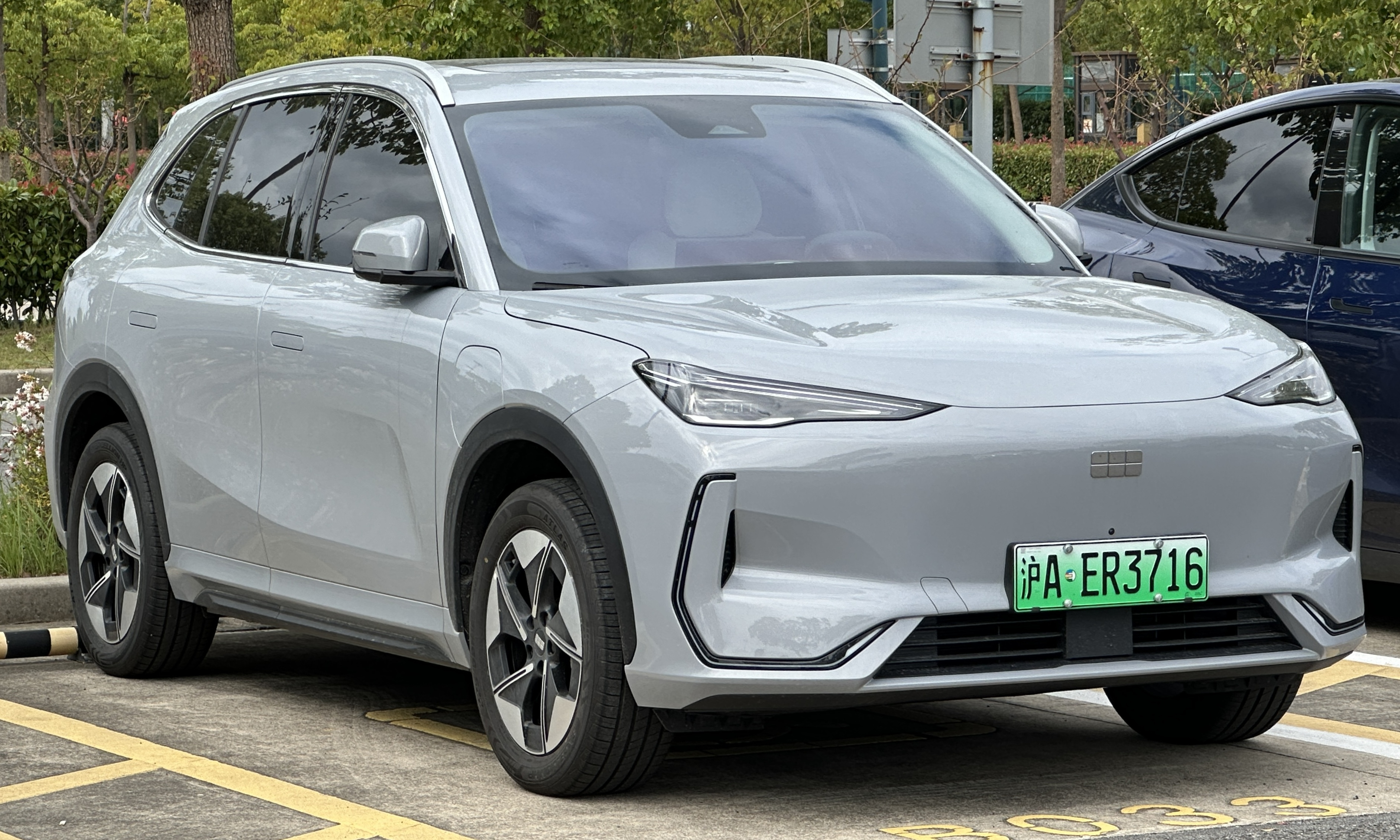
Geely Galaxy E5

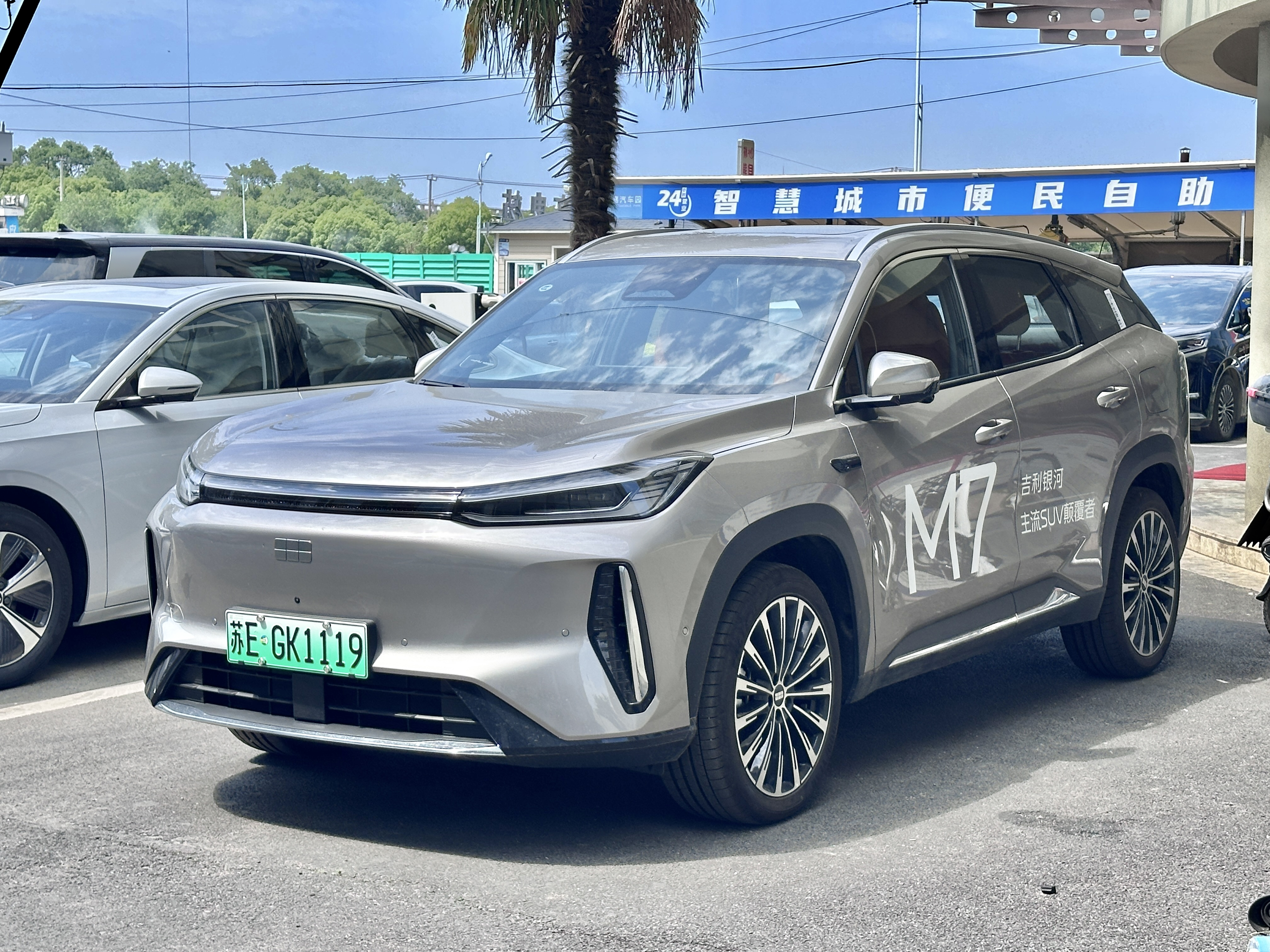
Geely Galaxy M7

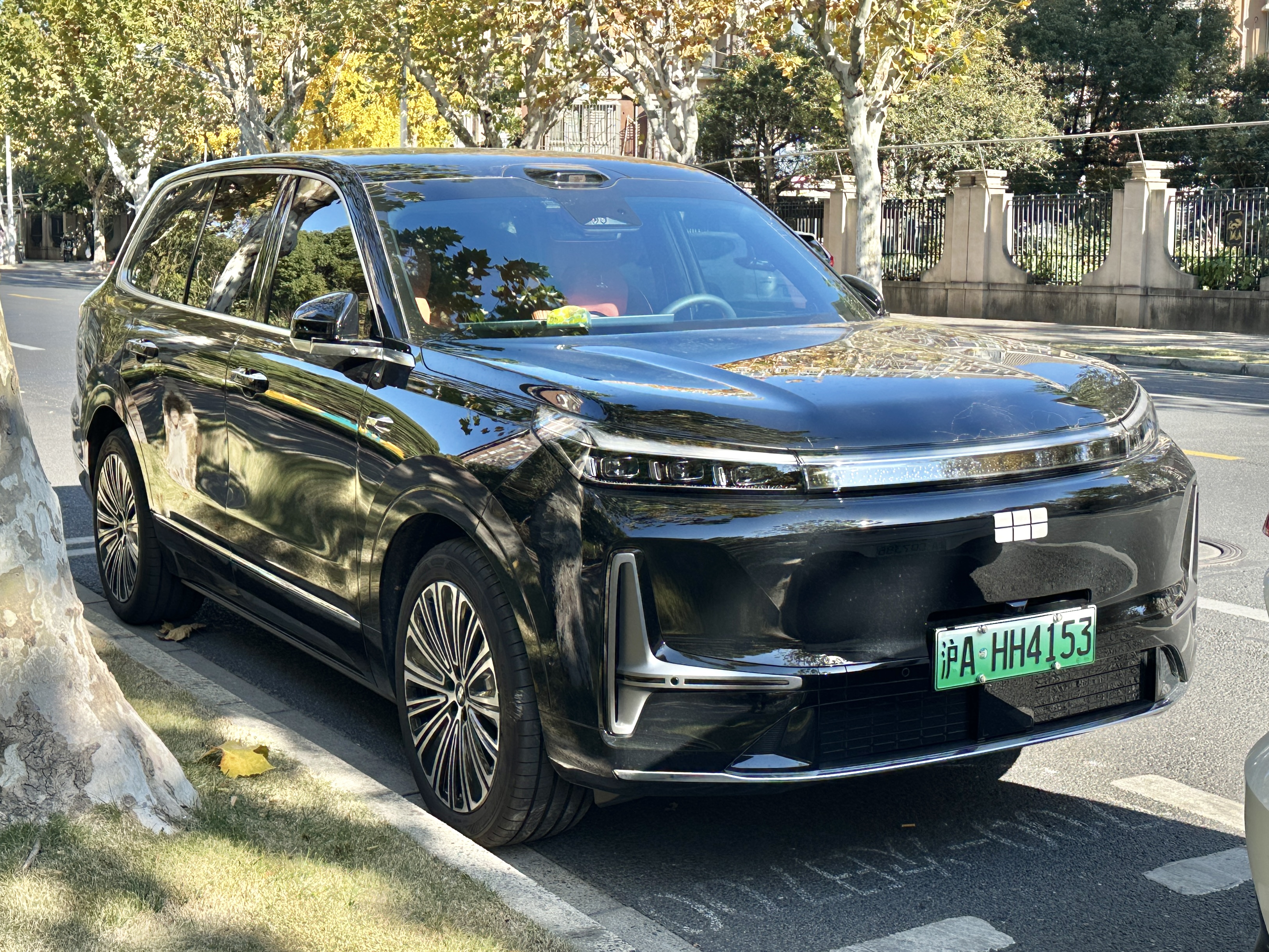
Geely Galaxy M9

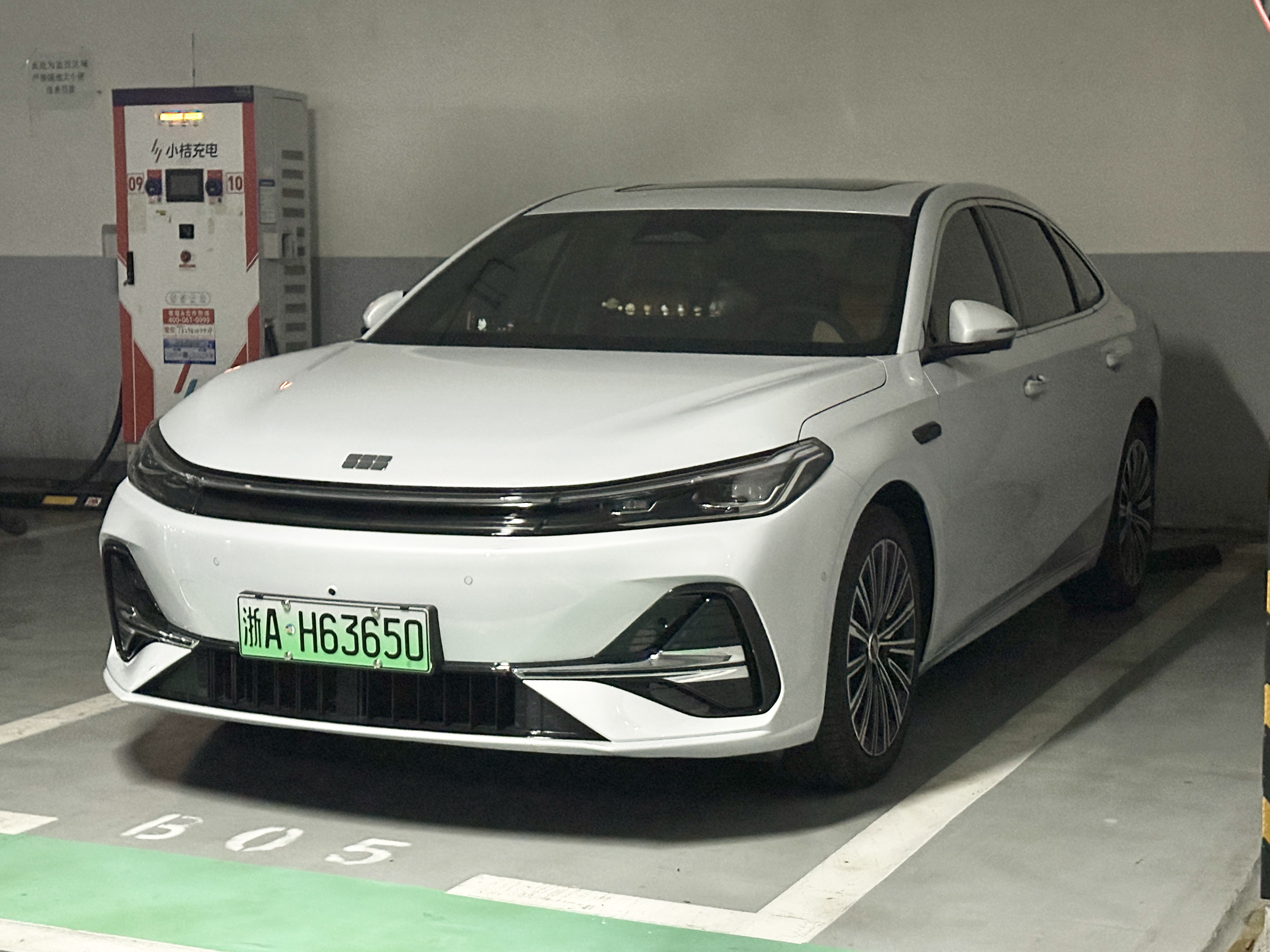
Geely Galaxy A7

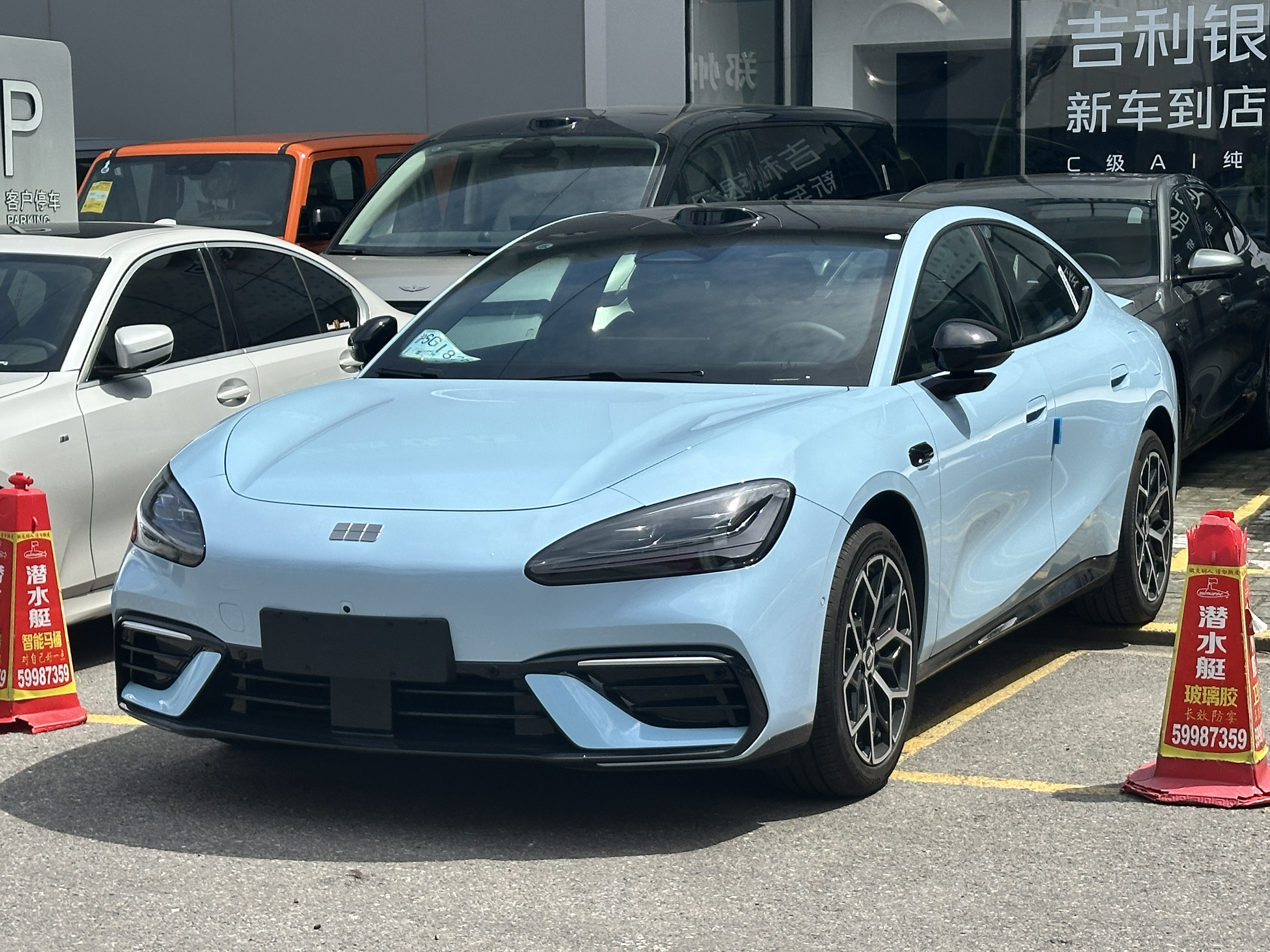
Geely Galaxy TT

==== Star Network (including former Geely Geometry models) ====
- Geely Galaxy LEVC L380 (2025–present), MPV, BEV, available in both sales channels
  - Geely Galaxy V900 (2026–present), EREV variant
- Geometry A/G6 (2019–present), compact sedan, BEV variant of Geely Emgrand L
- Geometry M6 (2022–present), compact SUV, BEV variant of Geely Emgrand S
- Geometry E (2022–present), subcompact SUV, BEV
- Geely Panda Mini EV (2022–present), city car, BEV
- Geely Galaxy Zhanjian/Cruiser 700 (upcoming), mid-size off-road SUV, PHEV.
- Geely Galaxy Xingjian/Starship 7 (2024–present), compact SUV, PHEV/BEV
- Geely Galaxy Xingyao/Starshine 6 (2025–present), mid-size sedan, PHEV
- Geely Galaxy Xingyao/Starshine 7 (2026–present), mid-size sedan, PHEV
- Geely Galaxy Xingyao/Starshine 8 (2025–present), mid-size sedan, PHEV/BEV
- Geely Xingyuan/Starwish (2024–present), subcompact hatchback, BEV
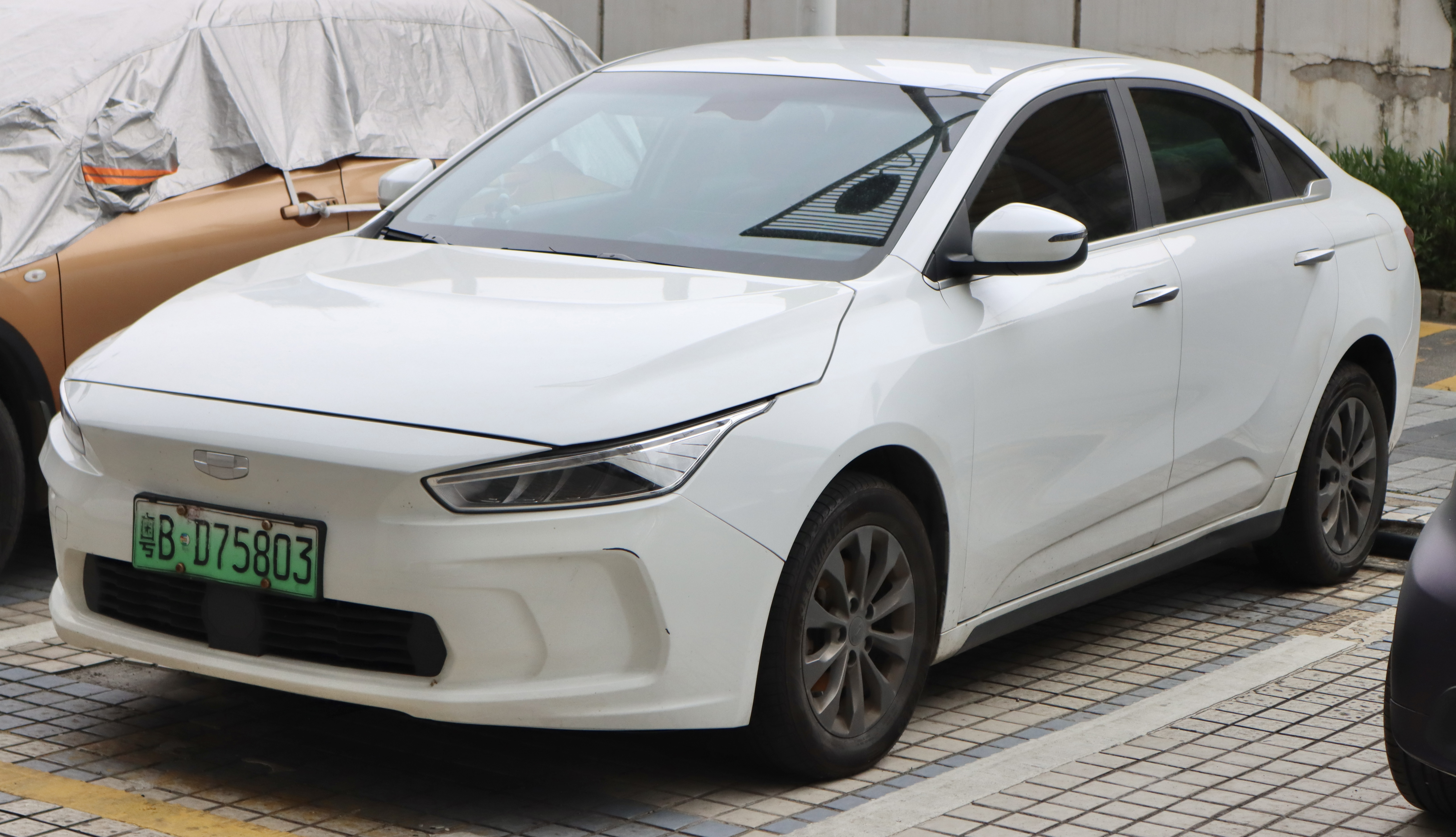
Geometry A

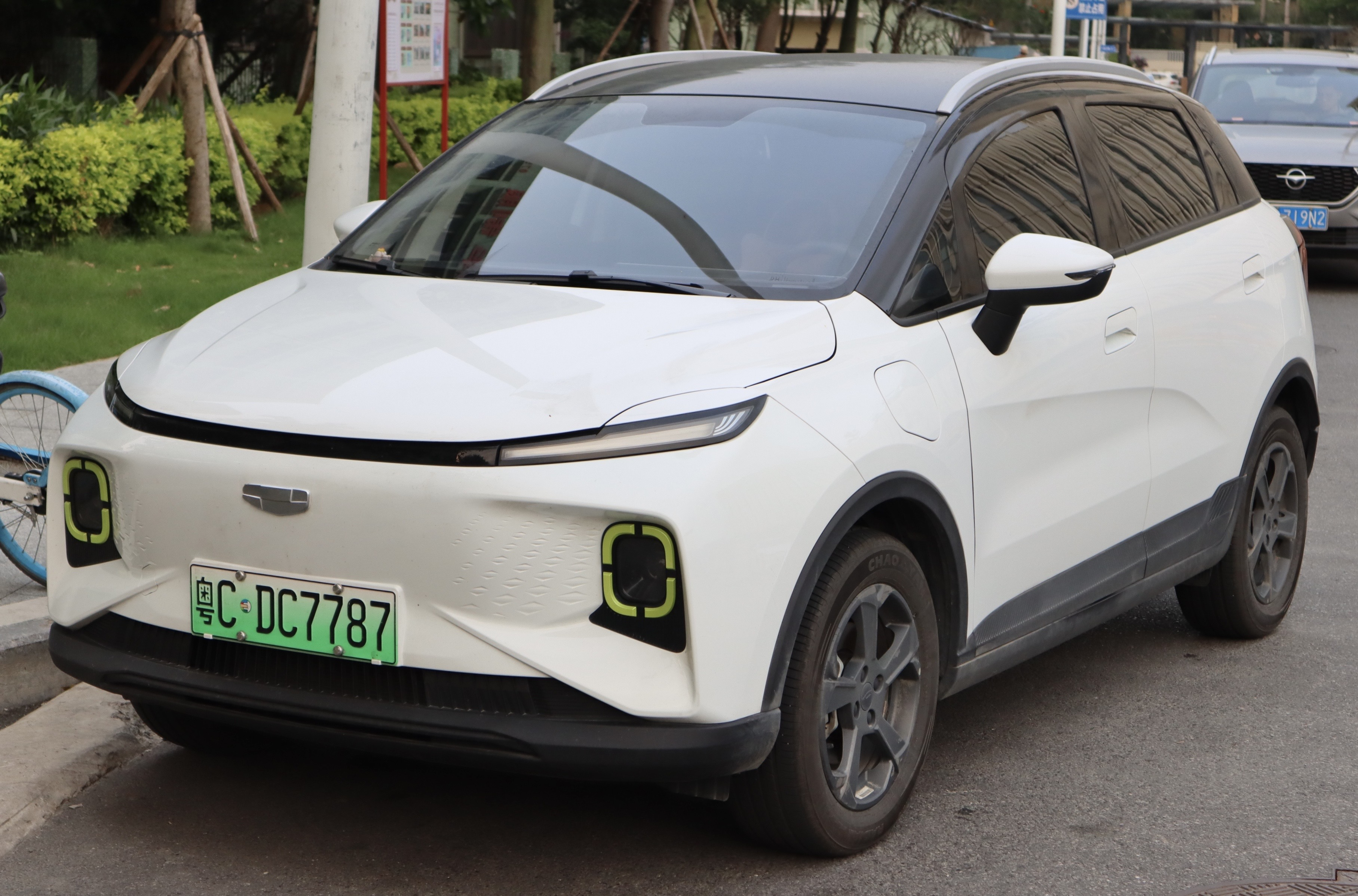
Geometry E

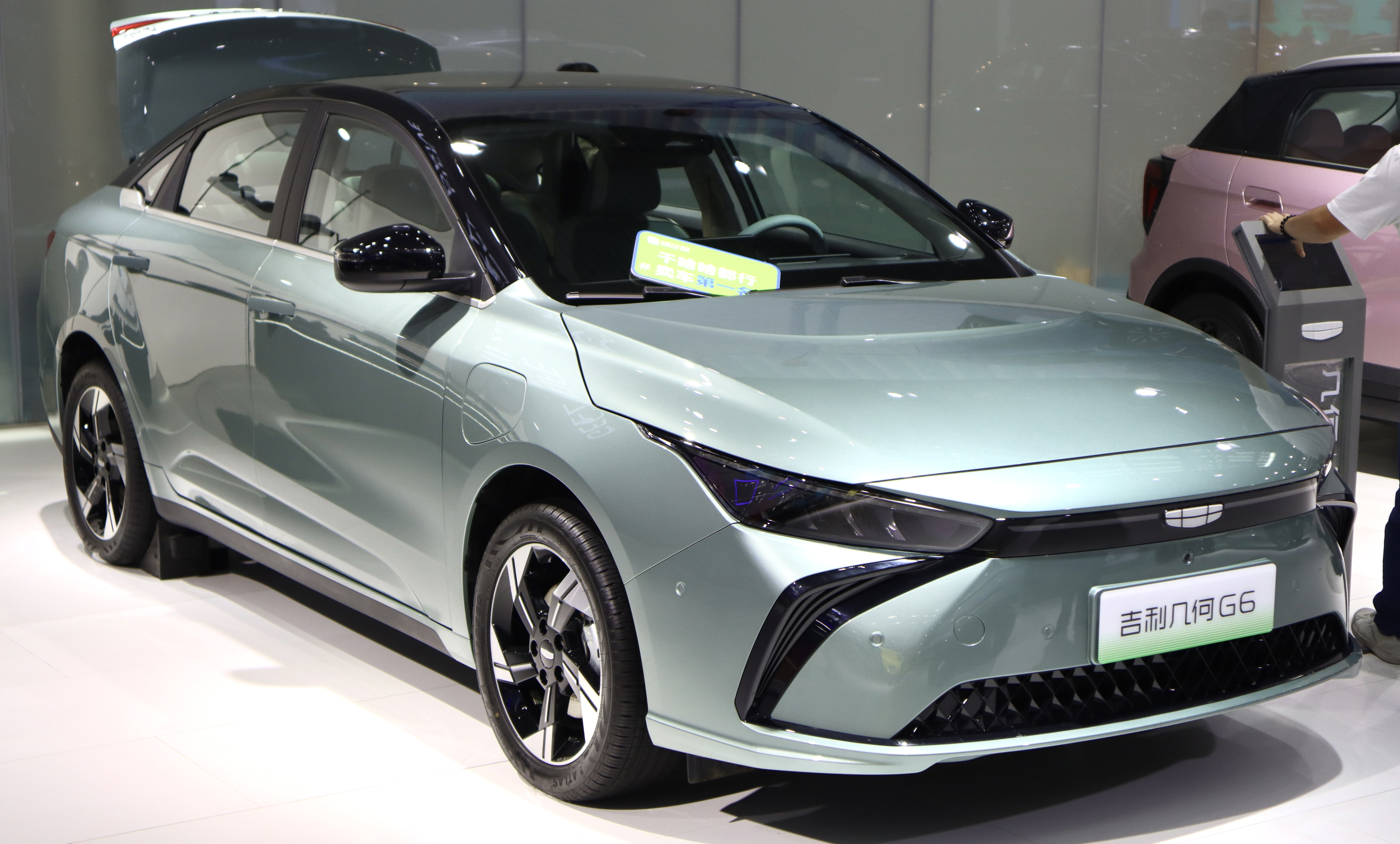
Geometry G6

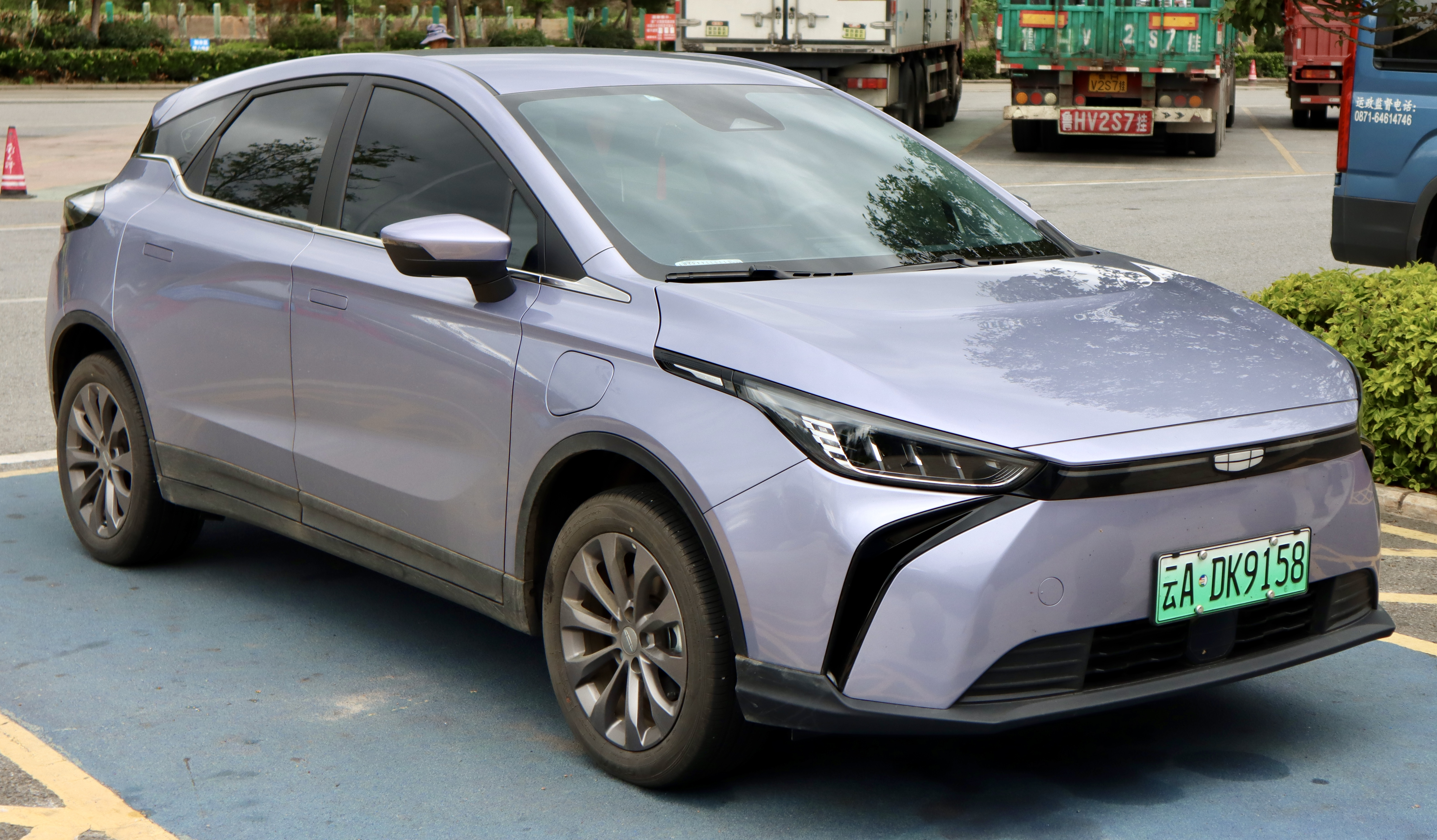
Geometry M6

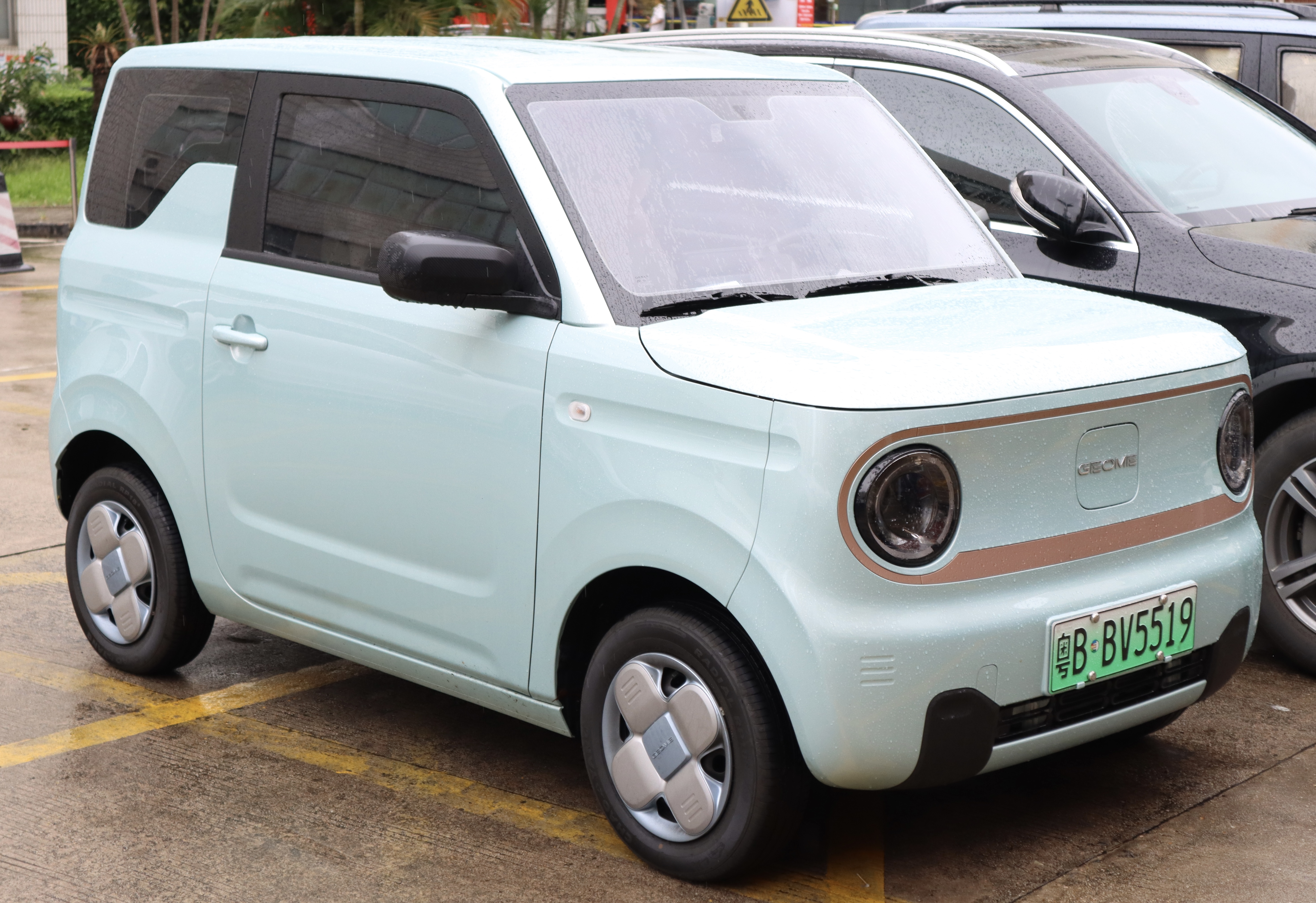
Geely Panda Mini EV

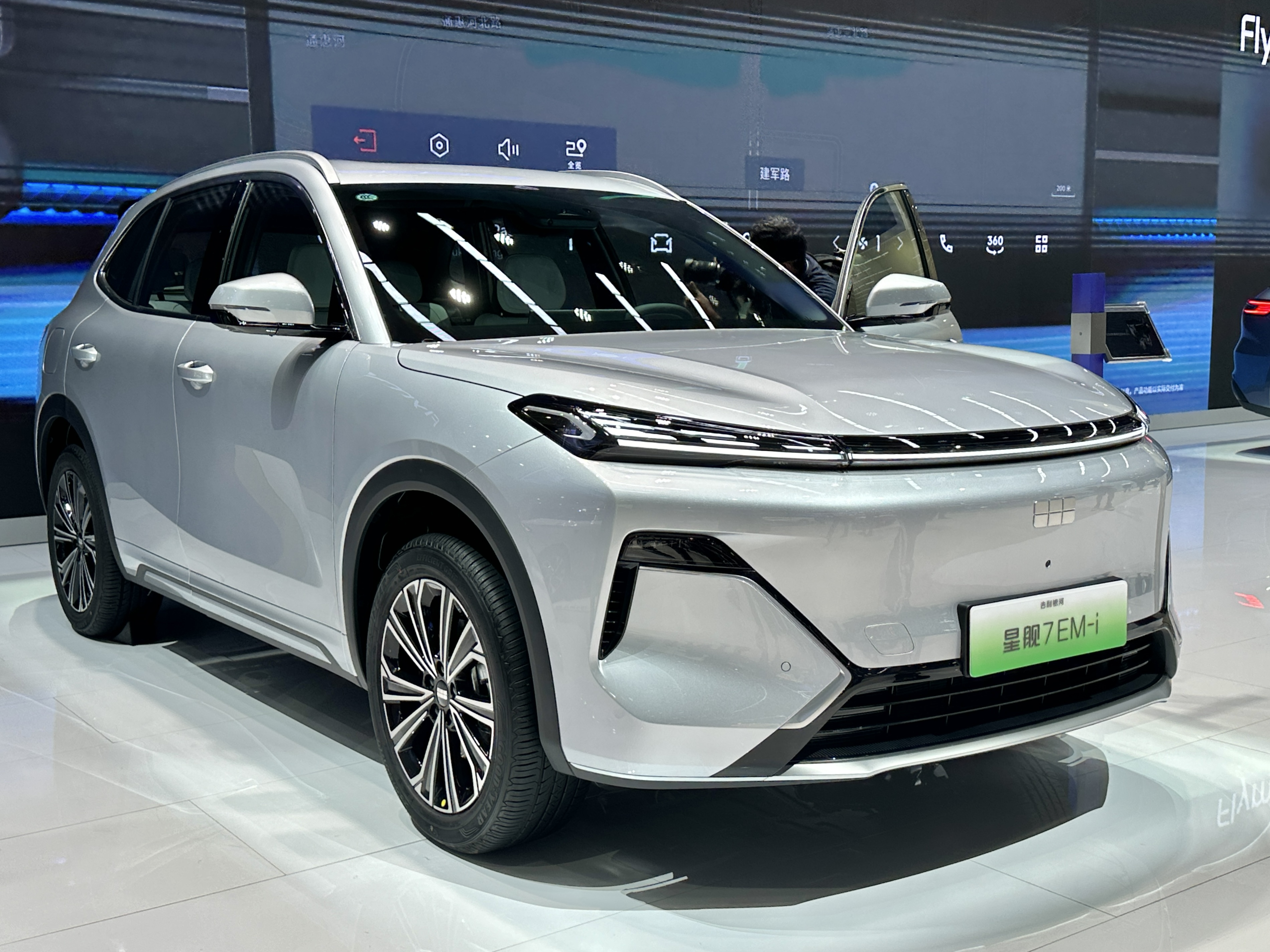
Geely Galaxy Xingjian 7

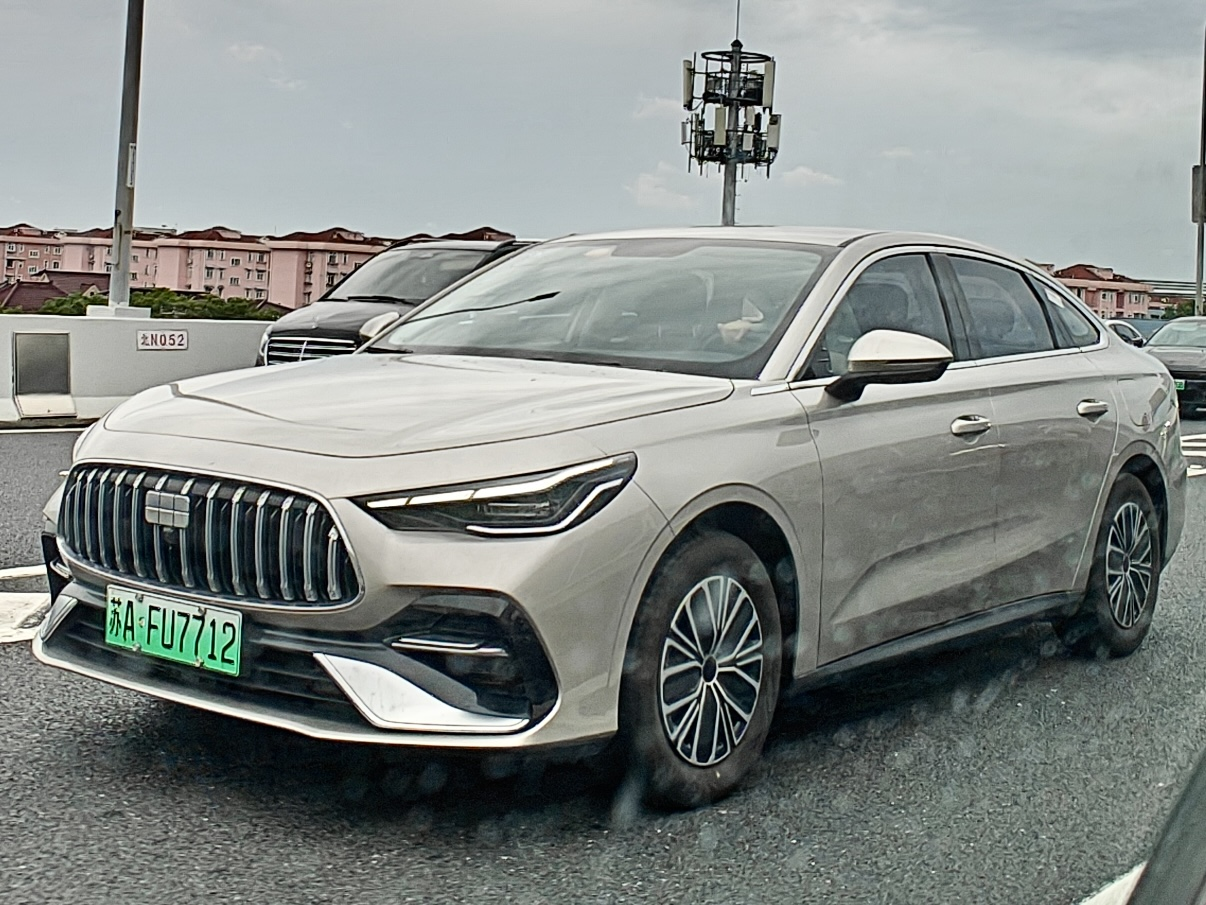
Geely Galaxy Xingyao 6

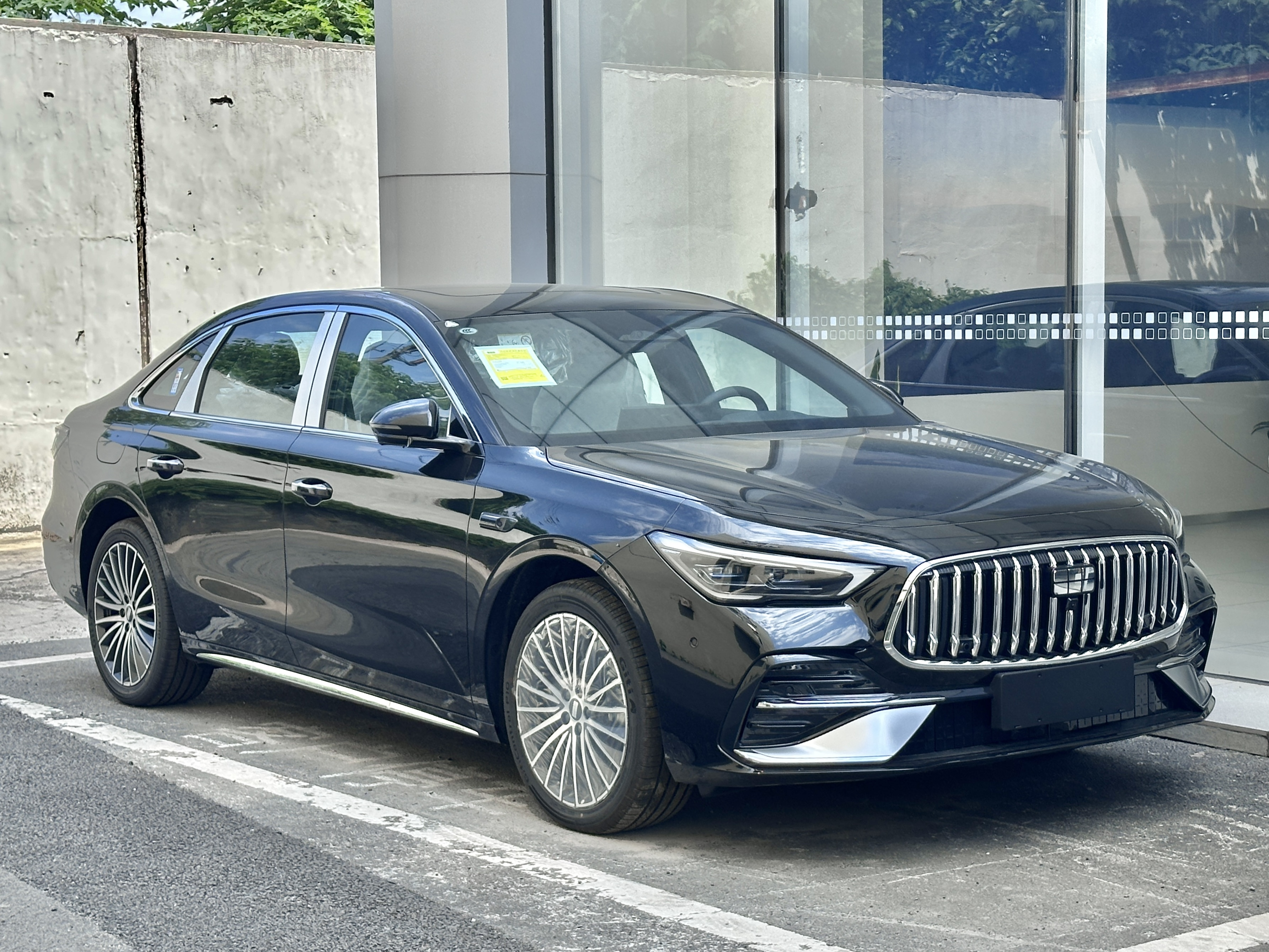
Geely Galaxy Xingyao 7

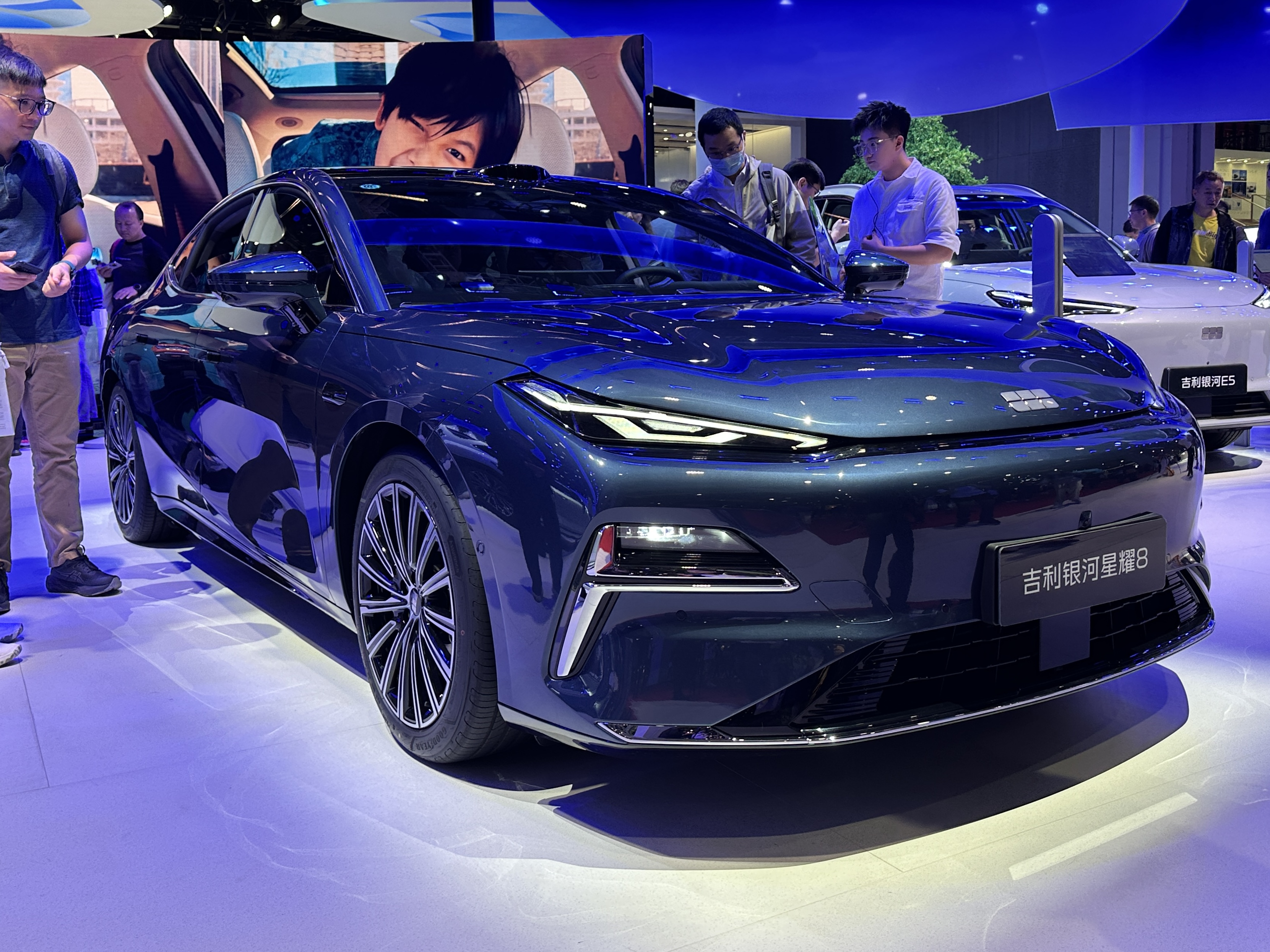
Geely Galaxy Xingyao 8

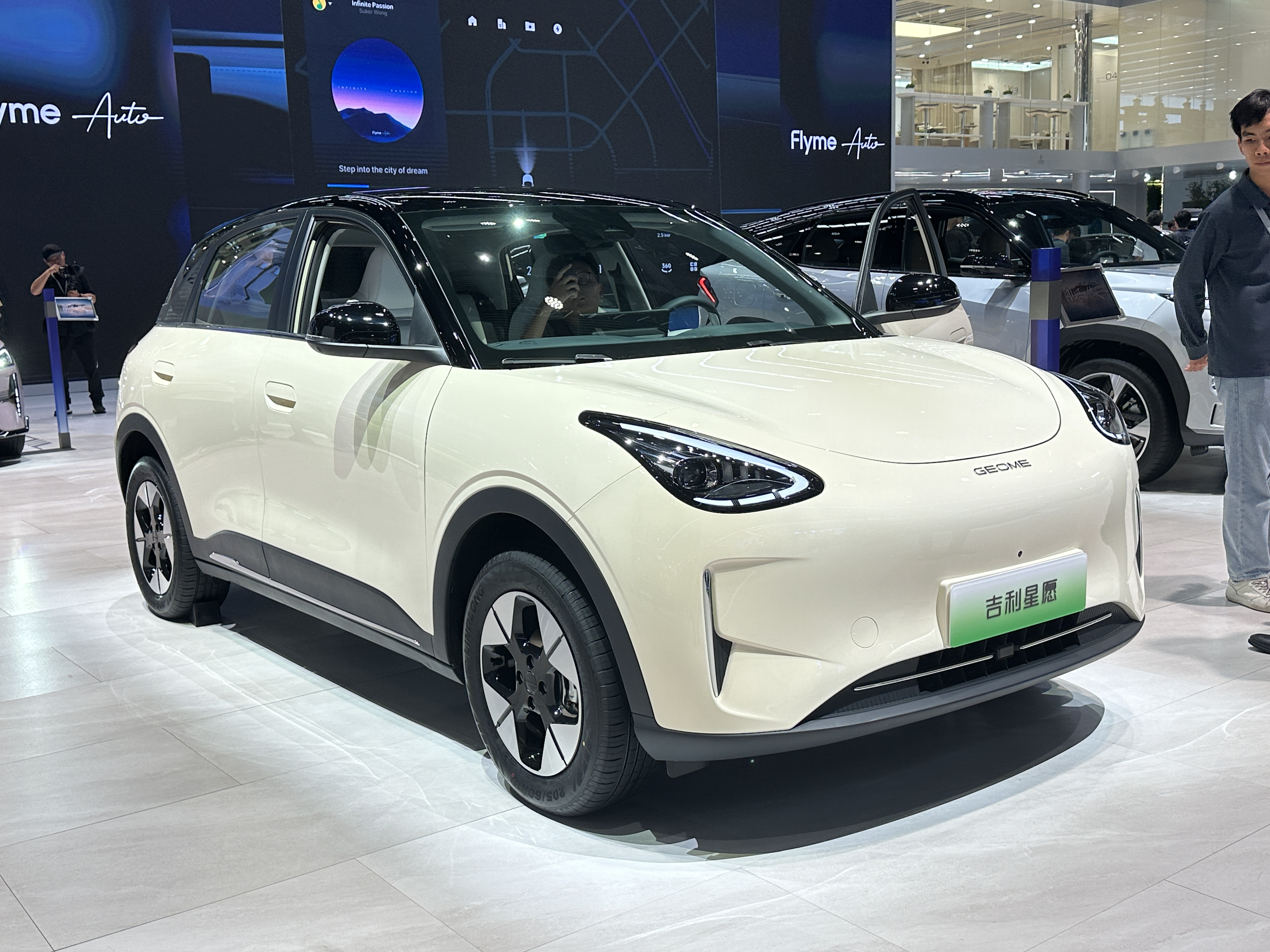
Geely Xingyuan

=== Discontinued models ===
==== Network A ====
- Geely Galaxy L7 (2023–2026), compact SUV, PHEV
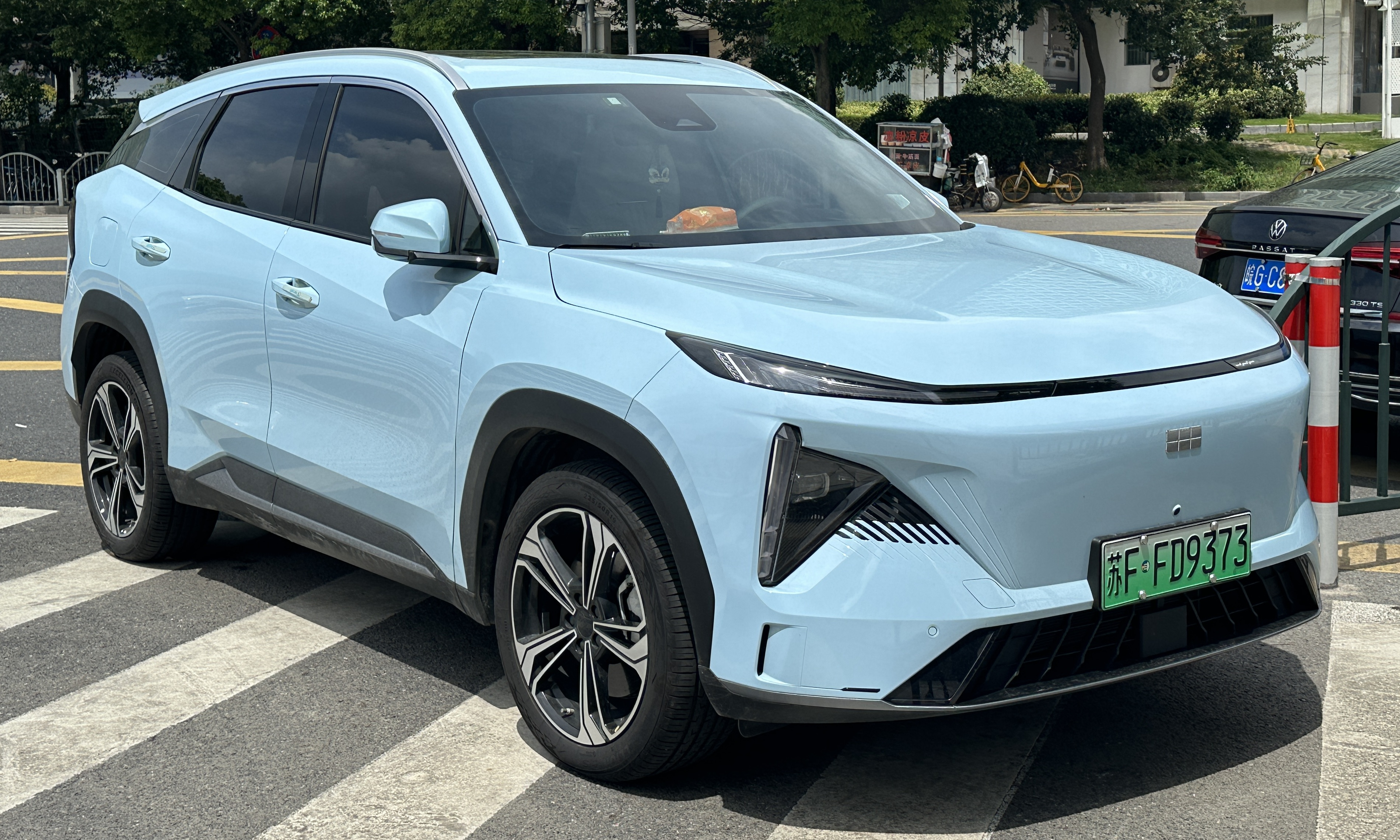
Geely Galaxy L7

=== Concept models ===
- Geely Galaxy Light, mid-size sedan
- Geely Galaxy Starship, full-size SUV
- Geely Galaxy Cruiser, off-road SUV
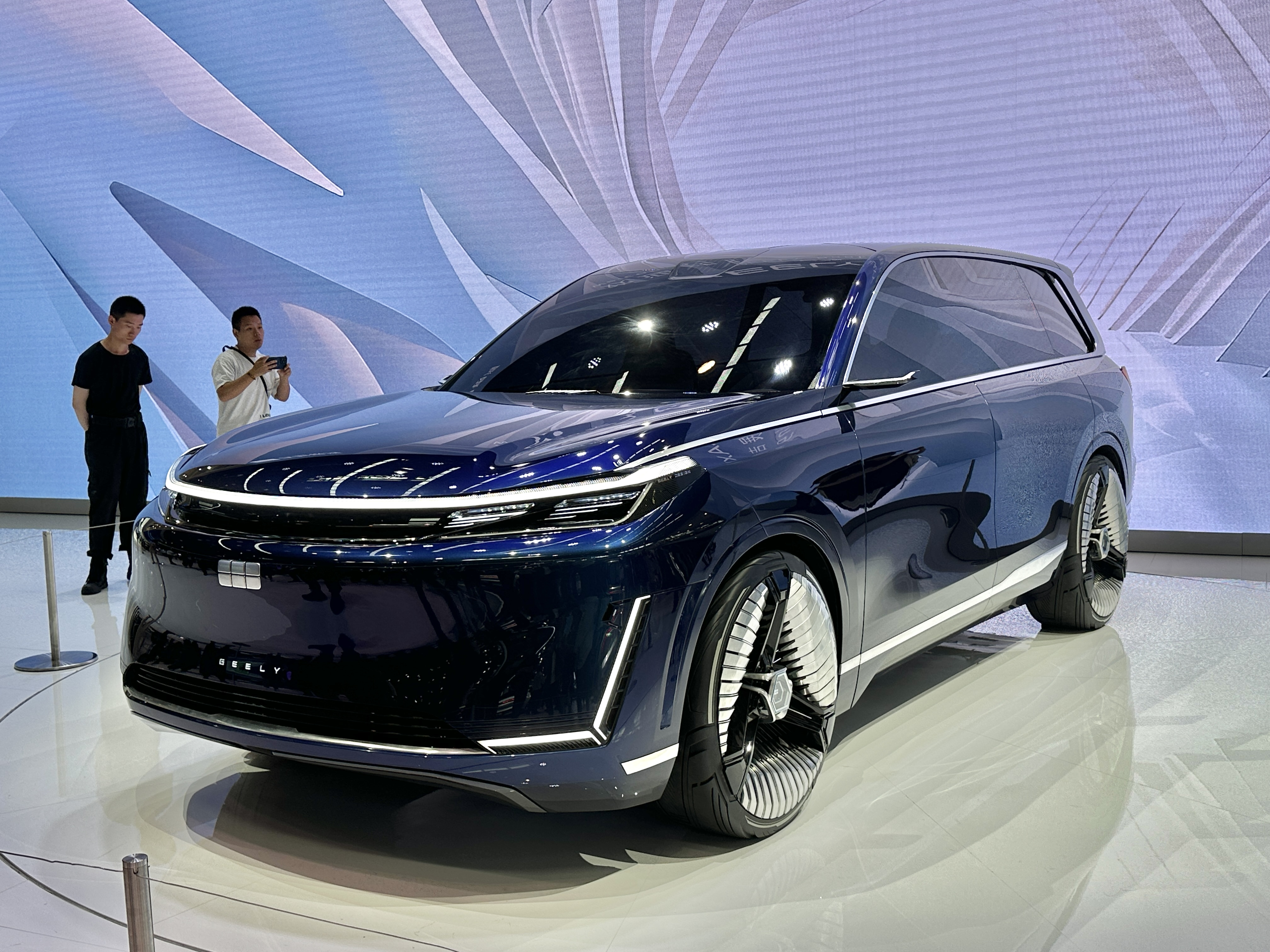
Geely Galaxy Starship

== Plagiarism controversy ==
On 28 February 2023, lawyers from fellow Chinese automaker Changan Automobile accused Geely of copyright infringement, sending Geely a cease-and-desist letter and alleging that the Geely Galaxy Light concept car took multiple design features from several Changan vehicles. Geely have refuted the claims and threatened legal action against Changan in response to what it labelled "misinformation". The lead designer for the concept car, Geely VP of Design Chen Zhengcheng, worked at Changan for almost 20 years until March 2022, and headed the design of several vehicles such as the Changan UNI-V.

== Sales ==
Year	Sales
2023	83,497
2024	494,440
2025	1,235,807
