= Horse Powertrain =

Vehicle engine manufacturer

Horse Powertrain Limited
- Type: Joint venture
- Industry: Automotive
- Founded: 31 May 2024; 2 years ago
- Headquarters: London, United Kingdom
- Area served: Worldwide
- Key people: Matias Giannini (CEO)
- Products: Internal combustion engines, hybrid systems, transmissions
- Owners: Renault (45%); Geely (45%, including Geely Holding and Geely Auto); Saudi Aramco (10%)
- Number of employees: 19,000 (2025)
- Subsidiaries: Aurobay (former Geely subsidiary); Horse (former Renault subsidiary)
- Website: horse-powertrain.com

Horse Powertrain Limited is a joint venture holding aimed at producing powertrains, including internal combustion engines (ICE) and hybrid systems. The venture holding was established in May 2024 and is equally owned by Renault and Geely (including Geely Holding and Geely Auto). It is headquartered in London, United Kingdom.

The company has two major subsidiaries, including Aurobay, a former Geely-owned powertrain company operating in Sweden and China with 9,000 employees, and Horse, a former Renault powertrain division with 9,000 employees. In total the company has 19,000 employees.

== History ==
The joint venture project was announced in November 2022 and codenamed Horse project by Renault and Rubik project by Geely. The Renault Group and Geely namesake brands would be the first to receive the powertrains and they would later be supplied to Dacia, Volvo, Lynk & Co and Proton cars, as well as Nissan and Mitsubishi Motors ones. Sourcing to third parties is also part of the plan. According to CEO Matias Giannini, Horse is to fill technological and geographical gaps as automakers themselves focus on EVs, expecting over half of new vehicles sold by 2040 to still be equipped with an internal combustion engine.

In July 2023, Renault announced it had spun off its ICE and hybrid powertrain operations into a Horse-named subsidiary based in Madrid, Spain. Geely was set to join later by integrating its Swedish powertrain division (Aurobay) and various Chinese operations and merging them both with Horse into a holding company owned by Renault and Geely, with Aramco a potential late investor. Later that same month, the two companies signed a binding agreement for the creation of the venture holding, with Renault operations initially headquartered in Madrid and Geely's in Hangzhou. Both Geely and Renault were set to transfer their intellectual property for ICEs and hybrid systems to the venture holding. The venture holding was set to be established and start operations in the second half of 2023, pending regulatory clearances. After various regulatory delays, the venture was officially established in late May 2024.

On 3 December 2024, Aramco acquired 10% of Horse Powertrain. The Arab energy and chemical company will have a representative on the board of directors.

== List of engines ==
=== H10 ===
The H10 is 1-liter, 3-cylinder engine petrol/ethanol engine designed as a range extender engine, providing up to 70 kW (94 hp; 95 PS) of continuous electric power. It is also marketed as the Renault TCe 110 engine.

=== S10 ===
The S10 is a 1-liter, 3-cylinder engine designed for industrial applications. It outputs a maximum of 57 kW (76 hp; 77 PS). The engine was developed in collaboration with Spanish UTV manufacturer Corvus.

=== HR13 ===
The Horse HR13 engine will be used in the Caterham Academy racing programme. The HR13DDT variant is used in the Dacia Duster, Nissan Qashqai, and Mercedes A-Class.

=== B15 ===
A 1.5-liter gasoline engine delivering up to 120 kW (163 PS; 161 hp) and 255 N⋅m (188 lb⋅ft) of torque designed for hybrid powertrain applications.

=== C15 ===
The C15 engine is a 1.5 liter four-cylinder engine, designed for use as a range extender owing to its small footprint. It is designed to meet Euro 7, China 7 and SULEV20 emissions standards. The engine will be available in 70 kW (94 hp; 95 PS) and a turbo-charged 120 kW (161 hp; 163 PS) variant. The engine is compatible with gasoline, ethanol and methanol flex fuels.

=== K15 ===
The K15 is a 1.5-liter, 4-cylinder diesel engine producing a maximum of 65 kW (87 hp; 88 PS) of continuous electrical power through its generator for range extender application.

=== HR18 ===
The HR18 is a 1.8-liter Atkinson-cycle internal combustion engine, designed for use in a hybrid powertrain. The engine delivers up to 80 kW (107 hp; 109 PS) power and 172 N⋅m (127 lb⋅ft) of torque, weighing in at 100 kg (220 lb). It is the first engine developed entirely by Horse Powertrain, and is used as part of a hybrid powertrain in the most powerful variant of the Dacia Bigster.

=== M20 ===
The M20 is a 2.0-liter, 4-cylinder diesel engine producing up to 105 kW (141 hp; 143 PS) of continuous electric power, designed for use as a range extender in agricultural and industrial EVs. The company also introduced a hydrogen combustion variant of this engine.

=== D20 ===
The D20 is a 2.0-liter 4-cylinder methanol engine paired with an axial-flux motor for use as a compact range-extender or external generator. It outputs up to 105 kW (141 hp; 143 PS) and has a peak fuel-to-electricity efficiency of 47% achieved with the help of high-energy spark plugs which allow for ultra-lean air-fuel ratios; it is capable of charging a 40 kWh battery with 20 L (5.3 U.S. gal) of methanol. The axial-flux motor uses a yokeless two-rotor single-stator design, allowing it to be 46% shorter than a comparable conventional radial-flux motor. Due to the use of silicon carbide power electronics, the electrical system has a peak efficiency of 96.4%. The engine meets China 6b and Euro 7 emissions standards, and can cold start in −35 °C (−31 °F) ambient conditions. It weighs 170 kg (375 lb) including the power electronics module.

=== W30 ===
The W30 is an upcoming 3.0-liter twin-turbocharged V6 engine, designed to be mated with a mild- or full-hybrid system. It has a 90-degree V-angle, which lowers the center of gravity and allows tighter packaging, including mounting the turbos between the cylinder banks in a hot vee configuration. The engine weighs 160 kg (353 lb) and can be mounted in a longitudinal or transverse orientation. It produces 350–400 kW (469–536 hp) and 600–700 N⋅m (443–516 lb⋅ft) of torque. Redline is 8,000 rpm. The first application of the engine will be in the Lotus Emira.

== Transmissions ==
=== DHTS210 ===
The DHTS210 is a series-parallel hybrid transmission with a P1+P3 motor configuration and a single direct drive gear to drive the wheels mechanically with the ICE. It uses a 100 kW (134 hp; 136 PS) P1 motor and a 210 kW (282 hp; 286 PS) P3 motor with 400-volt class power electronics for a maximum wheel torque of 3,500 N⋅m (2,581 lb⋅ft). The transmission has a length of 516 mm (20.3 in) and a wet weight of 120 kg (265 lb).

=== DHT290 ===
The DHTS290 is a series-parallel hybrid transmission with a P1+P3 motor configuration and a single direct drive gear to drive the wheels mechanically with the ICE. It uses a 145 kW (194 hp; 197 PS) P1 motor and a 290 kW (389 hp; 394 PS) P3 motor with 900-volt class power electronics, including a 1200-volt silicon carbide hybrid drive power module, for a maximum wheel torque of 4,920 N⋅m (3,629 lb⋅ft) and a wet weight of 129 kg (284 lb).

=== 3DHT200 ===
The 3DHT200 is a plug-in hybrid electric drive transmission unit which first debuted in the Geely Galaxy Cruiser 700. It uses a P1+P3 motor layout as a series-parallel hybrid with a 3-speeds available for the ICE to mechanically drive the wheels. It has a 110 kW (148 hp; 150 PS) P1 motor and a 230 kW (308 hp; 313 PS) P3 motor with a maximum speed of 20,000rpm, and the system has a peak wheel torque of 4,920 N⋅m (3,629 lb⋅ft). Horse says the unit has 13-in-1 integration, as combines the P1 and P3 motors and motor controllers, onboard charger, DC-DC converter, PDU, TCU, PVC, THM, TMS, 3-speed gearbox, and motor gearbox into a single package, reducing volume used by 10%. Horse says the motors use a more optimal '3V' permanent magnet layout in their rotors rather than a '2V' layout, increasing torque density by 15% and power density by 20%.

In the Geely Galaxy 700, the 3DHT200 is used to reach peak output of 830 kW (1,113 hp; 1,128 PS) when combined with a 2.0-liter turbocharged engine and a P4 rear-axle drive unit.

=== 4LDHT ===
The 4LDHT is a hybrid transmission intended for use with larger displacement engines such as the W30 V6. It is a 4-speed series-parallel hybrid with a P1+P3 motor configuration, where the ICE has access to all 4 speeds while the traction motor has access to 2 speeds. The P1 and P3 motor outputs range from 250–300 kW (335–402 hp; 340–408 PS) and 350–450 kW (469–603 hp; 476–612 PS), respectively, and peak wheel torque exceeds 9,200 N⋅m (6,786 lb⋅ft). It has a wet weight of 199 kg (439 lb) and uses 800-volt class power electronics. It is expected to become available in 2028.

=== F15 ===
The F15 is an all-in-one ICE drive unit intended to replace a BEV's front motor drive unit to allow for conversion into a plug-in hybrid, range extender, or hybrid powertrain. It pairs the C15 engine with either a single P2 motor for the compact configuration or P1+P3 motors for the performance configuration, with electric traction power exceeding 200 kW (268 hp; 272 PS). The naturally aspirated engine outputs up to 70 kW (94 hp; 95 PS) and is paired with a 70 kW (94 hp; 95 PS) generator, while the turbocharged engine outputs up to 120 kW (161 hp; 163 PS) and uses a generator outputting up to 85 kW (114 hp; 116 PS). It uses a 800-volt class power electronics and can support front- or all-wheel drive.

=== C15 ===
The C15 is an all-in-one ICE drive unit similar to the F15, but instead replaces the rear motor drive unit rather than the front motor, and the engine is laid flat on its side. According to Horse, it is designed to be installed on the rear subframe for double isolation to minimize NVH, and the location at the rear of the vehicle moves the engine's exhaust system out of the way, maximizing underfloor space for packaging the battery pack and passenger compartment. It has identical specifications to the F15, except the naturally aspirated engine is paired with up to a 56 kW (75 hp; 76 PS) generator while the turbo variant is paired with up to a 110 kW (148 hp; 150 PS) generator.
