= Geely Galaxy L7 =

Plug-in hybrid compact crossover SUV

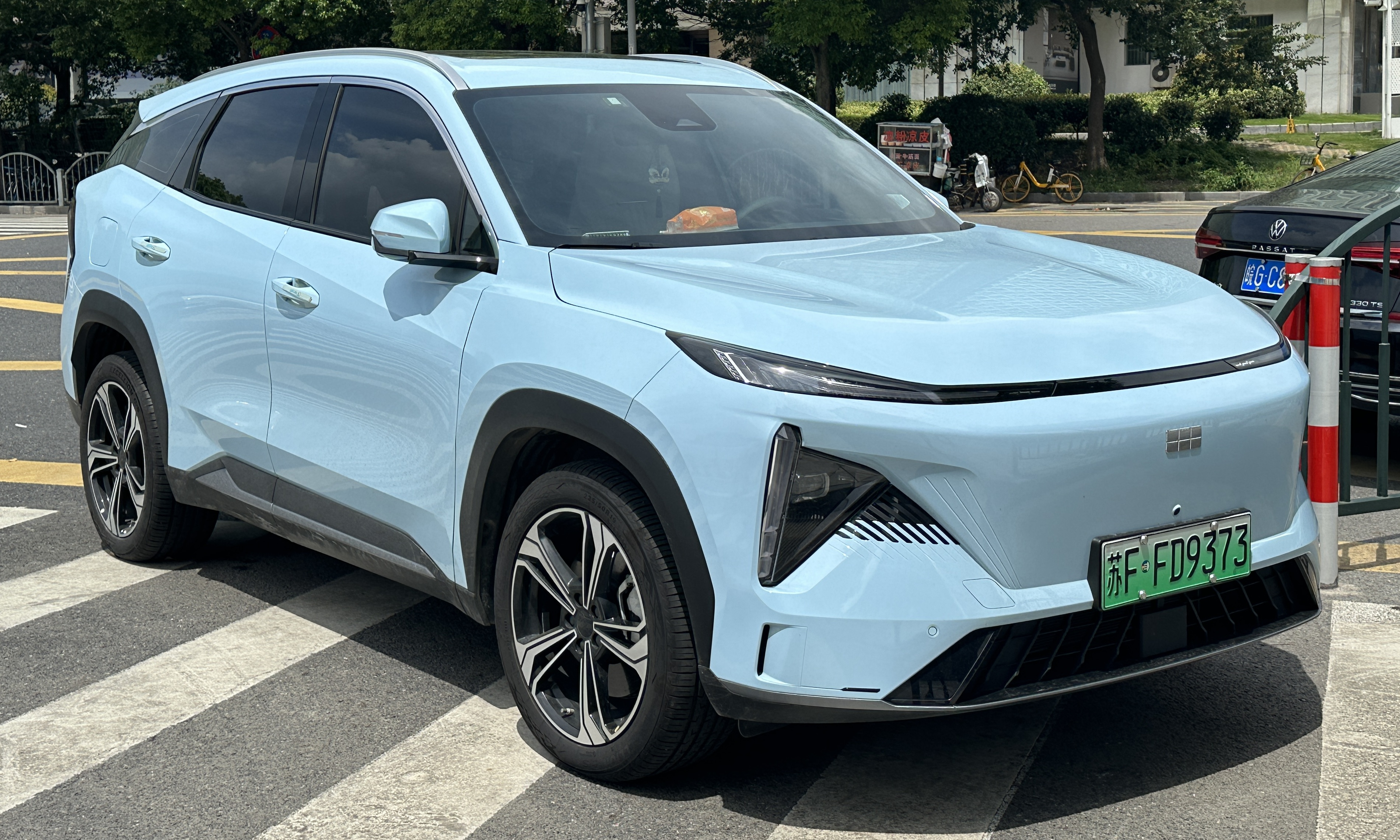

Overview
- Manufacturer: Geely Auto
- Production: April 2023 – 2026
- Assembly: China: Baoji, Shaanxi

Body and chassis
- Class: Compact crossover SUV
- Body style: 5-door SUV
- Layout: Front-engine, front-wheel-drive; Front-engine, four-wheel-drive
- Platform: Compact Modular Architecture (CMA)
- Related: Geely Galaxy M7; Geely Boyue L; Geely Xingyue L; Geely Xingyue S

Powertrain
- Engine: Petrol plug-in hybrid: 1.5 L BHE15-BFN I4; 1.5 L BHE15-BFZ turbo I4
- Electric motor: Permanent magnet synchronous motor
- Transmission: 3-speed NordThor DHT (3DHT); 1-speed E-DHT (EM-i)
- Hybrid drivetrain: Plug-in hybrid
- Battery: 18.4 kWh LFP; 18.7 kWh LFP; 29.8 kWh LFP

Dimensions
- Wheelbase: 2,785 mm (109.6 in)
- Length: 4,700 mm (185.0 in)
- Width: 1,905 mm (75.0 in)
- Height: 1,785 mm (70.3 in)
- Curb weight: 2,245 kg (4,949 lb)

Chronology
- Successor: Geely Galaxy M7

The Geely Galaxy L7 (Chinese: 吉利银河L7; pinyin: Jílì Yínhé L7) is a plug-in hybrid compact crossover SUV manufactured by Geely Auto under the Geely Galaxy marque.

== Overview ==
Originally codenamed FX12, the Galaxy L7 is a first model in the Galaxy plug-in hybrid and electric vehicle series. It is equipped with the Qualcomm Snapdragon 8155 chip and Geely's Galaxy N-OS operating system, which was upgraded to Flyme Auto from 2025.

The L7's primary powertrain is named NordThor Hybrid 8848, combining a 1.5-litre turbocharged petrol engine with a 3-speed dedicated hybrid transmission and one or two electric motors. The front-wheel-drive variant uses the petrol engine and a single electric motor, while the four-wheel-drive variant adds a second motor. The single-motor front-wheel-drive variant produces 390 horsepower (291 kW; 395 PS), while the dual-motor four-wheel-drive variant produces 660 horsepower (492 kW; 669 PS) with a top speed of 200 kilometres per hour (124 mph) and a 0–100 kilometres per hour (62 mph) time of 6.9 seconds. Geely claims a thermal efficiency of 44.26% for the hybrid engine, which it describes as the highest among mass-produced hybrid engines at the time of launch.

For the 2025 model year, Geely introduced the more energy-efficient EM-i power system as the standard powertrain for the Galaxy L7, with the 3DHT NordThor system retained exclusively for top-tier configurations.

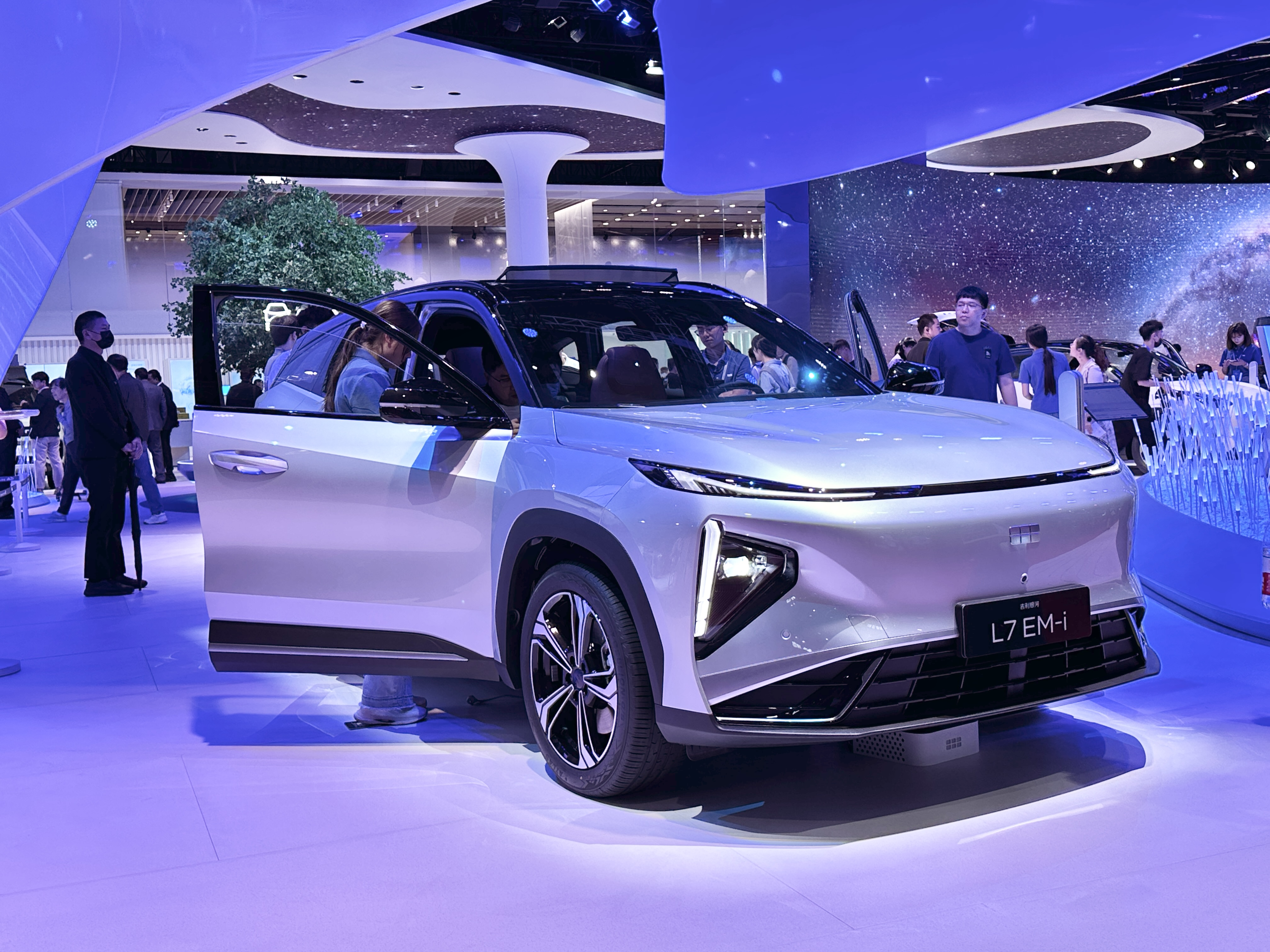
Geely Galaxy L7 EM-i

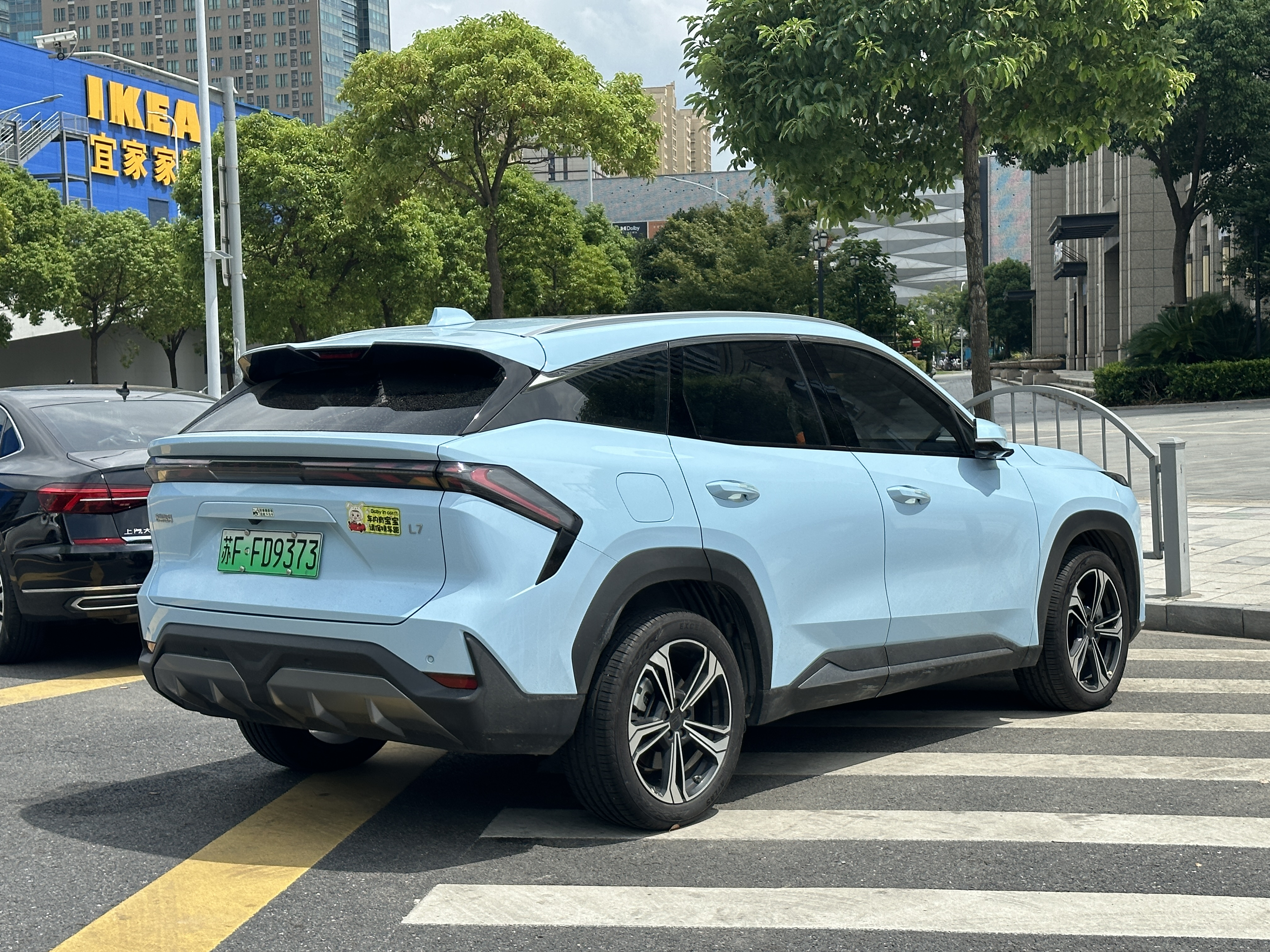
Rear view

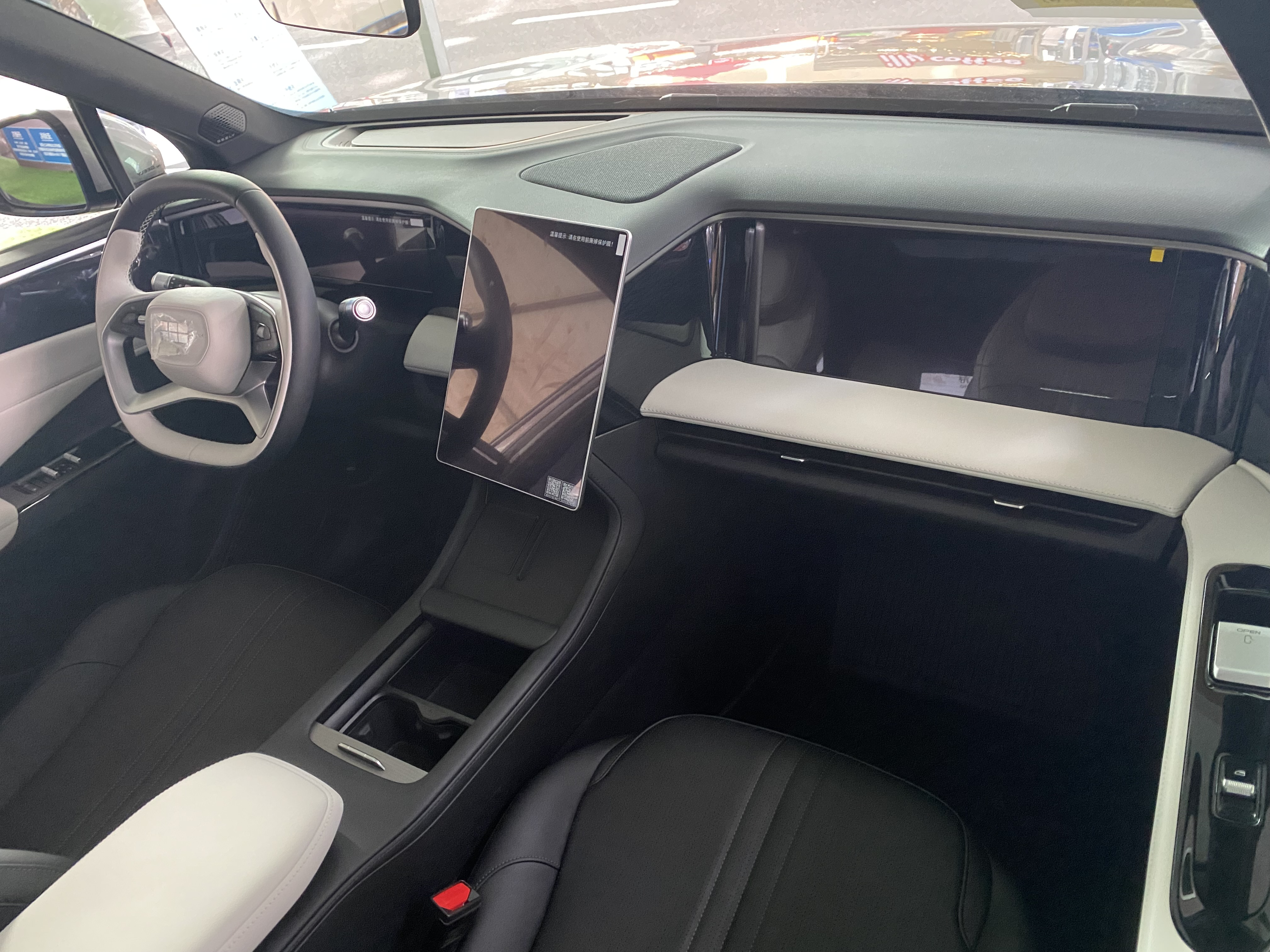
Interior

== Powertrain ==
Model	Engine / Motor	Power	Torque	Transmission
3DHT / EM-P	Engine: 1.5 L (1,499 cc) BHE15-BFZ I4 turbo petrol Front motor: PMSM	Engine: 120 kW (161 hp); Front motor: 107 kW (143 hp)	Engine: 255 N⋅m (188 lb⋅ft); Front motor: 338 N⋅m (249 lb⋅ft)	3-speed DHT
EM-i	Engine: 1.5 L (1,499 cc) BHE15-BFN I4 petrol Front motor: PMSM	Engine: 82 kW (110 hp); Front motor: 160 kW (215 hp)	Engine: 136 N⋅m (100 lb⋅ft); Front motor: 262 N⋅m (193 lb⋅ft)	1-speed DHT

== Safety ==
C-NCAP (2021) test results 2023 Geely Galaxy L7 1.5T 115km Max
Category		%
Overall:	5 /5 stars	90.0%
Occupant protection:		92.71%
Vulnerable road users:		80.00%
Active safety:		89.58%

== Sales ==
Year	China
2023	66,247
2024	74,274
2025	36,334
