= Geely Galaxy Starshine 7 =

Plug-in hybrid mid-size sedan

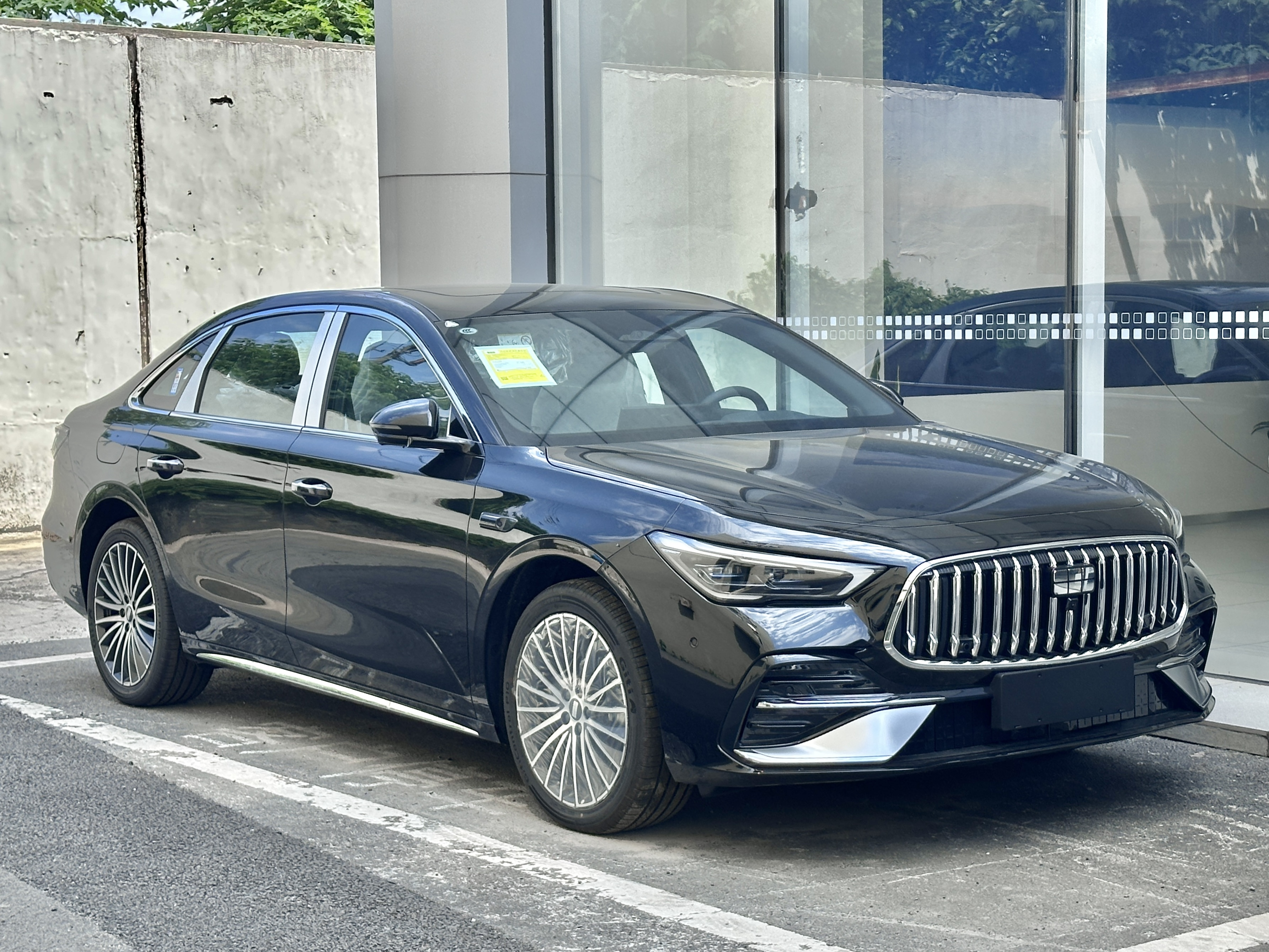

Overview
- Manufacturer: Geely Auto
- Model code: P182
- Production: 2026–present
- Assembly: China: Huzhou, Zhejiang

Body and chassis
- Class: Mid-size car (D)
- Body style: 4-door sedan
- Layout: Front-engine, front-motor, front-wheel-drive
- Platform: Global Intelligent New Energy Architecture (GEA)
- Related: Geely Galaxy A7; Geely Preface L Plus

Powertrain
- Engine: Petrol plug-in hybrid: 1.5 L BHE15-BFN I4
- Electric motor: 120 kW
- Hybrid drivetrain: Plug-in hybrid
- Battery: 18.99 kWh LFP; 28.3 kWh LFP; 28.5 kWh LFP
- Electric range: 115–170 km (71–106 mi) (CLTC)

Dimensions
- Wheelbase: 2,852 mm (112.3 in)
- Length: 4,958 mm (195.2 in)
- Width: 1,915 mm (75.4 in)
- Height: 1,505 mm (59.3 in)
- Curb weight: 1,815–1,860 kg (4,001–4,101 lb)

The Geely Galaxy Starshine 7 (Chinese: 吉利银河星耀7; pinyin: Jílì Yínhe Xīngyào 7) is a plug-in hybrid mid-size sedan to be manufactured by Geely Auto under the Geely Galaxy marque.

== Overview ==
On March 17, 2026, Geely Galaxy released the official picture of the Starshine 7. is a mid-size sedan similar in size and design to the Starshine 6, compared to which it is 52 mm (2.0 in) longer with a 96 mm (3.8 in) longer wheelbase, 29 mm (1.1 in) wider, and 15 mm (0.59 in) taller. It was registered on the MIIT database in October 9, 2025, however a launch date has not yet been announced.

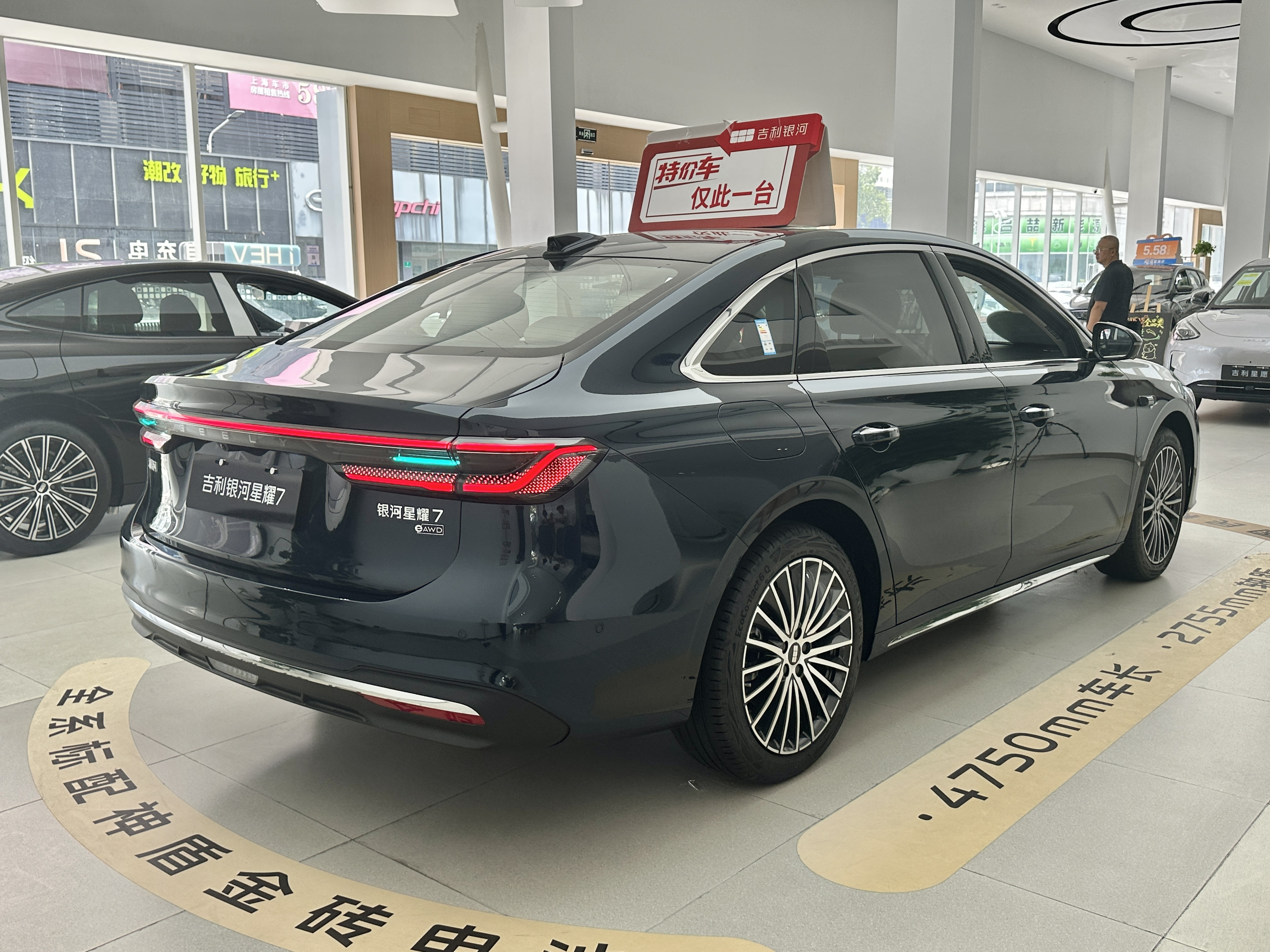
Rear view

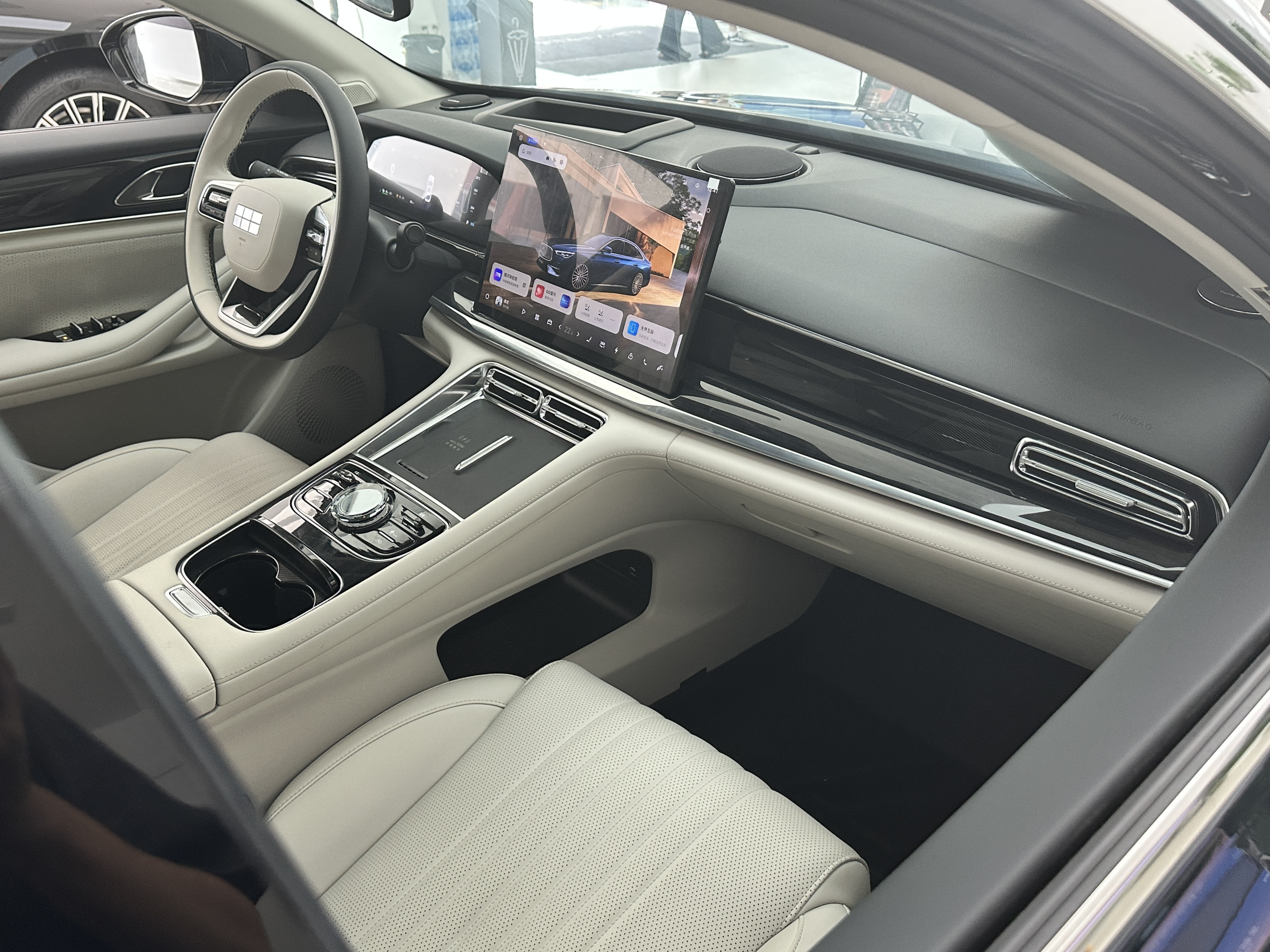
Interior

=== Design ===
In the front, the Starshine 7 uses a trapezoidal grille with vertical chrome inserts similar to the smaller Starshine 6, which has been compared to styling Mercedes-AMG models by news outlets. At the sides, traditional door handles are used. The overall design is similar to the Starshine 6, however the Starshine 7 uses a continuous light strip whereas the Starshine 6's taillights are separated. The Starshine 7 will also offer rims that are between 17 and 19 inches in size.

== Powertrain ==
The Starshine 7 is equipped with Geely's Thor AI Hybrid 2.0 system, which uses a 1.5-liter naturally aspirated inline-4 codenamed BHE15-BFN producing 110 hp (82 kW; 112 PS) and an electric motor producing 161 hp (120 kW; 163 PS) with a top speed of 190 km/h (118 mph). The engine has a thermal efficiency of 47.26%, allowing for CLTC fuel consumption of 2.8 L/100 km (84 mpg_{‑US}) when the battery is fully depleted. Power is supplied by a choice of two LFP battery options: 19.0kWh with a CLTC electric range rating of 115–120 km (71–75 mi), and 28.3kWh with a range of 165 km (103 mi).

The all-wheel drive version has a combined power output of 418 hp (312 kW; 424 PS) and 526 N⋅m (388 lb⋅ft) of torque, allowing for a 0–100 km/h (62 mph) time of 5.4 seconds.

Specifications
Battery		Engine	Range	Kerb weight
Type	Weight	Engine	EV	Kerb weight
28.3 kWh LFP	220 kg (485 lb)	1.5 L	170 km (106 mi)	1,750 kg (3,858 lb)
28.5 kWh LFP	214 kg (472 lb)	1.5 L	170 km (106 mi)	1,750 kg (3,858 lb)
