= Xingrui =

Xingrui could refer to:

- Geely Xingrui (Chinese: 吉利星瑞), sedan brand
- Ma Xingrui (Chinese: 马兴瑞), Chinese politician
- Shanxi Xingrui, a basketball team based in Taiyuan, Shanxi, China
