= Geely Galaxy A7 =

Plug-in hybrid and battery electric mid-size sedan

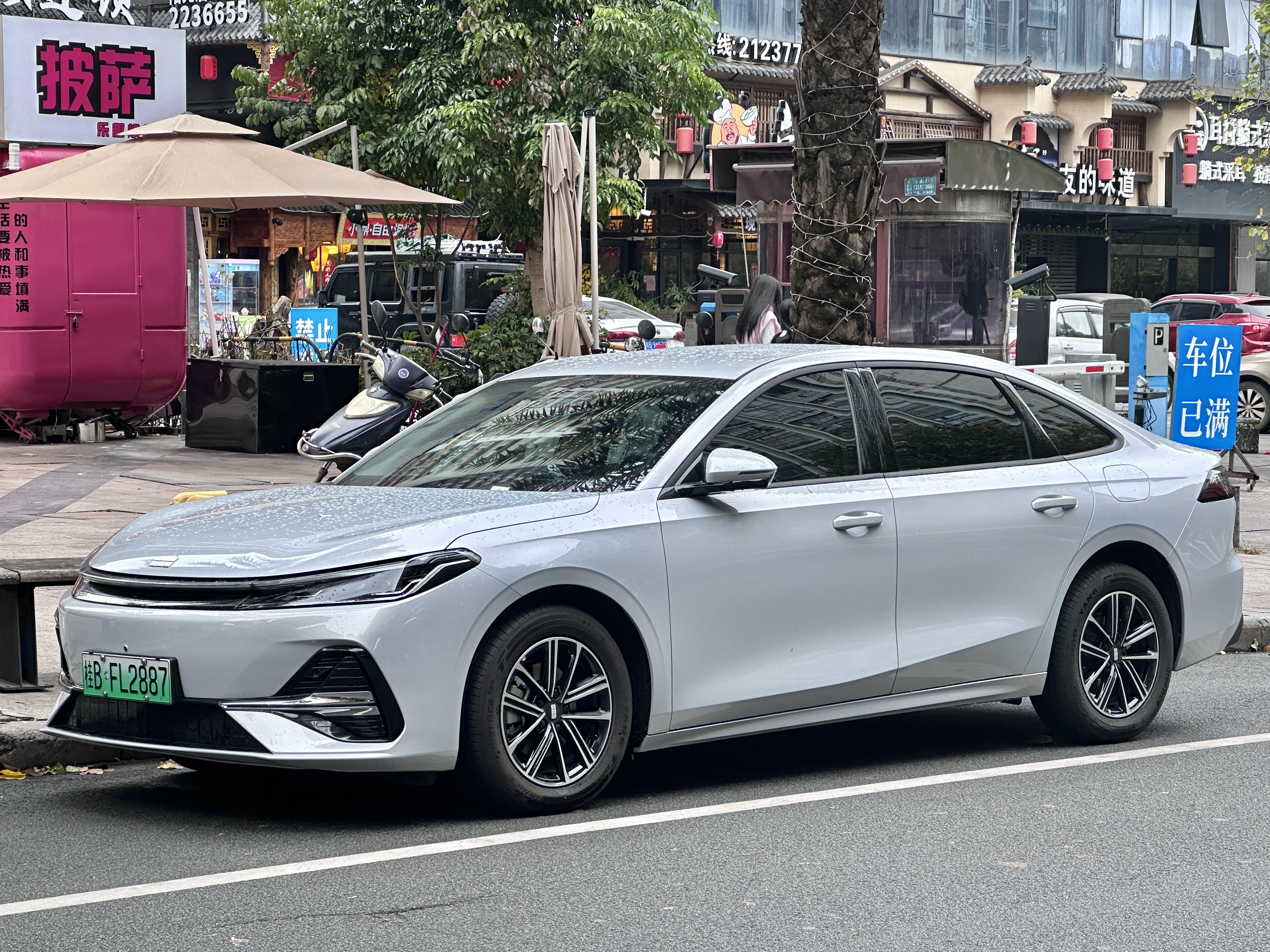
- Geely Galaxy A7 EM-i

Overview
- Manufacturer: Geely Auto
- Model code: P181
- Production: 2025–present
- Assembly: China: Guiyang, Guizhou

Body and chassis
- Class: Mid-size car
- Body style: 4-door sedan
- Layout: Battery electric: Front-motor, front-wheel-drive; PHEV (EM-i): Front-engine, front-motor, front-wheel-drive
- Platform: Global Energy Architecture
- Related: Geely Galaxy Starshine 7; Geely Galaxy Starship 7; Geely Preface L Plus

Powertrain
- Engine: Petrol plug-in hybrid: 1.5 L BHE15PFI n/a I4
- Electric motor: 11-in-1 Yaoning Technology Group Electric motor
- Power output: 175 kW (238 PS; 235 hp) (DM-i); 160 kW (218 PS; 215 hp) (EV)
- Hybrid drivetrain: Plug-in hybrid
- Battery: PHEV (EM-i): 8.5 kWh LFP; 18.4 kWh LFP; 18.99 kWh LFP; 28.3 kWh LFP; EV: 49.52 kWh LFP; 58.05 kWh LFP
- Range: 2,100 km (1,305 mi)
- Electric range: 55–150 km (34–93 mi)

Dimensions
- Wheelbase: 2,845 mm (112.0 in)
- Length: 4,918 mm (193.6 in)
- Width: 1,905 mm (75.0 in)
- Height: 1,495 mm (58.9 in)

The Geely Galaxy A7 (Chinese: 吉利银河A7; pinyin: Jílì Yínhé A7) is a plug-in hybrid and battery electric mid-size sedan produced by Geely under the Geely Galaxy marque.

== Overview ==
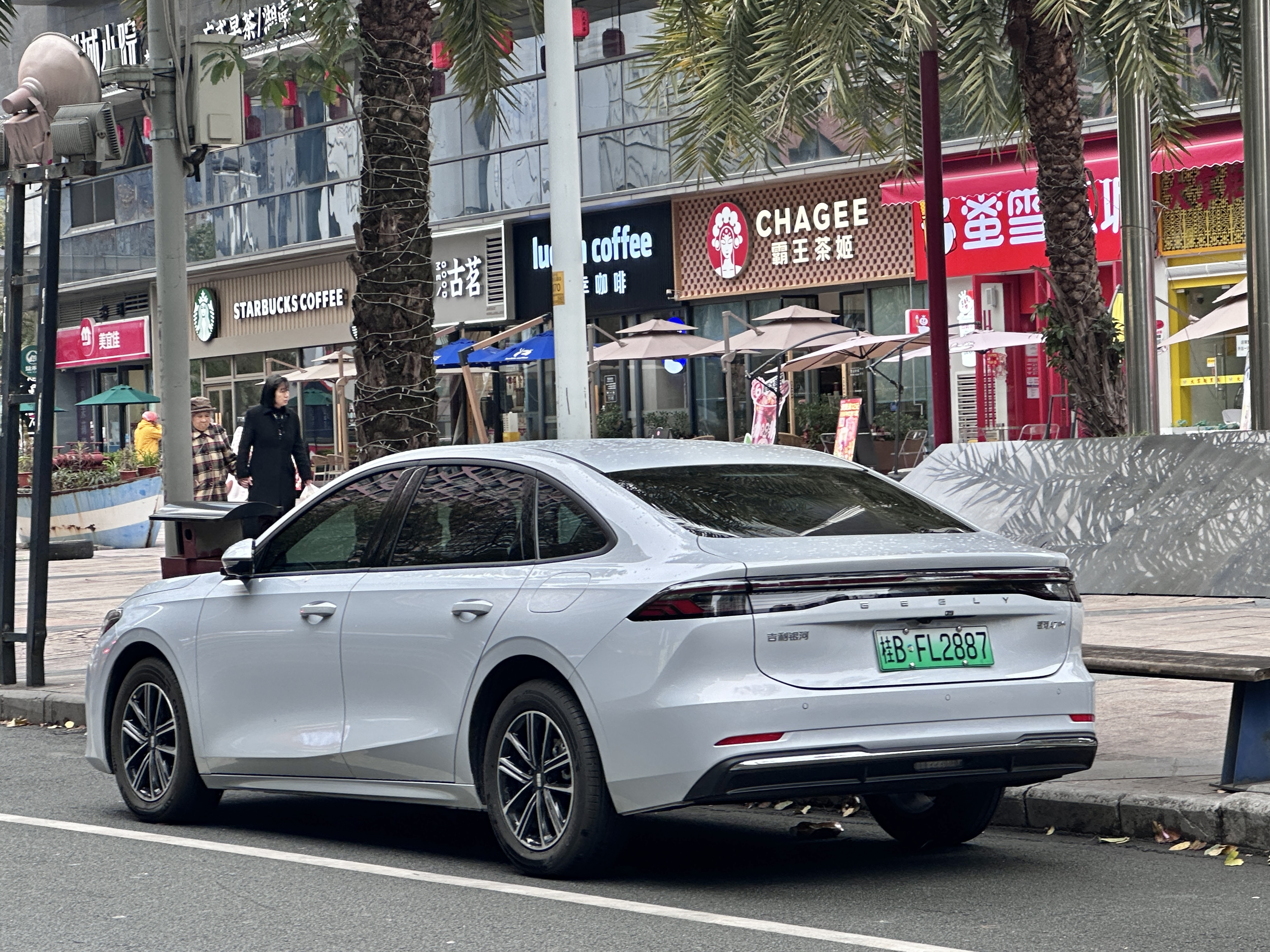
Rear view

The Galaxy A7 is a mid-size plug-in hybrid sedan slotting between the Starshine 6 and Starshine 7 models in the Geely Galaxy lineup. The model is mainly targeted at the BYD Seal 06 DM-i.

Pre-sales of the Galaxy A7 began on July 11, 2025. It was officially launched on August 8, 2025, at a starting price of 89,800 RMB, which is 8,000 RMB less than the price of the A7 during pre-sales.

=== Design ===
The Galaxy A7 uses the Galaxy Ripple design language, using full-width light bars in the front and rear. The bumper incorporates a trapezoid-shaped air intake decorated with chrome silver trimming. 19-inch turbine style rims wrapped in Continental tires as well as sculpted character lines. The A7 also uses traditional door handles instead of flush door handles.

=== Features ===
There is a large central touchscreen in the interior alongside a digital instrument cluster and an oval-shaped multifunction steering wheel.

Dashboard mounting points are utilized in the interior and can be used to mount devices magnetically. The Xiaomi SU7 has also done this previously.

== Galaxy A7 EV ==
A prototype version of the Galaxy A7 EV was seen testing in November of 2025. On April 7 2026, Geely Galaxy unveiled exterior images of the vehicle online. The A7 EV launched on April 22, 2026.

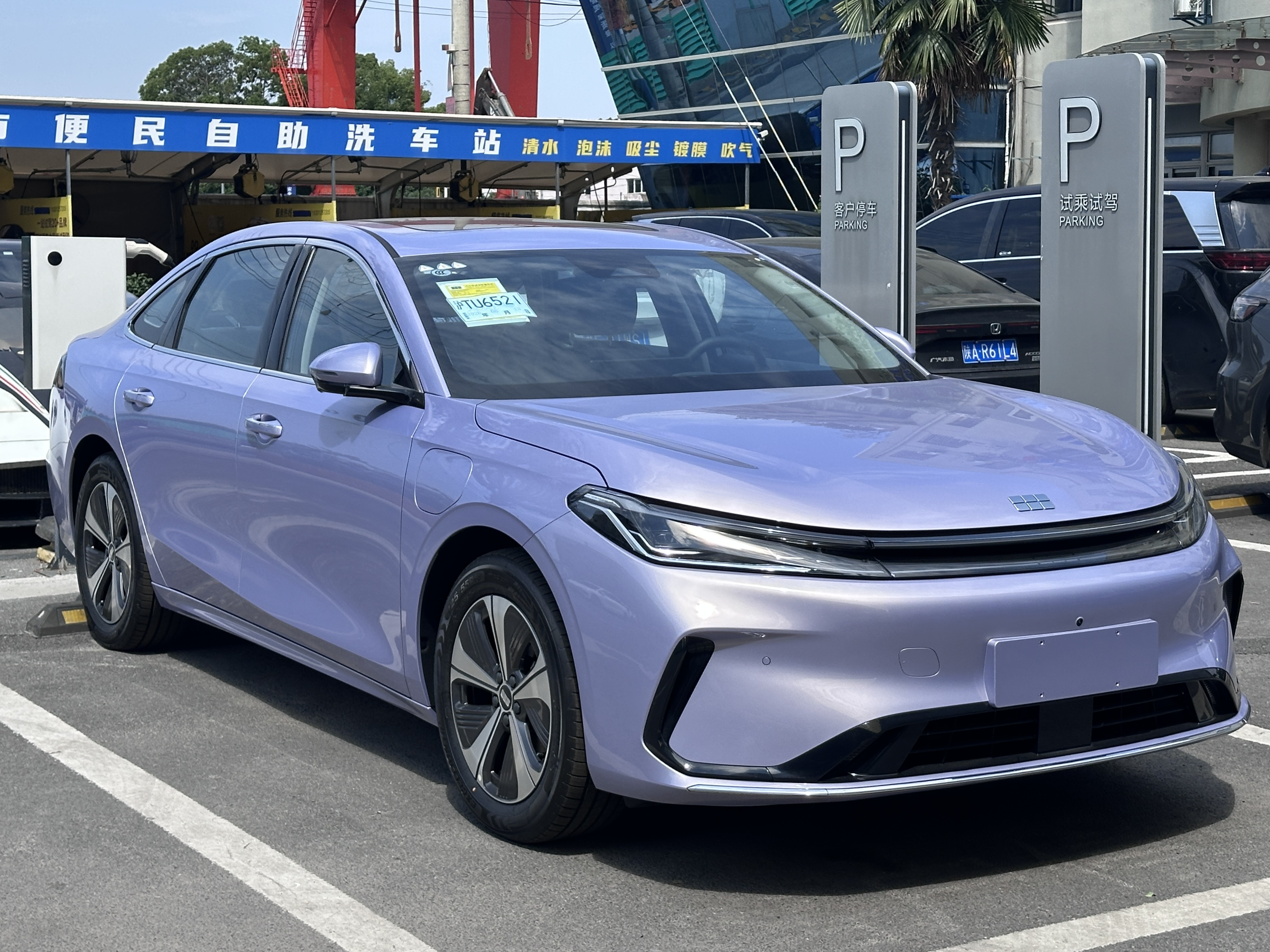
Geely Galaxy A7 EV

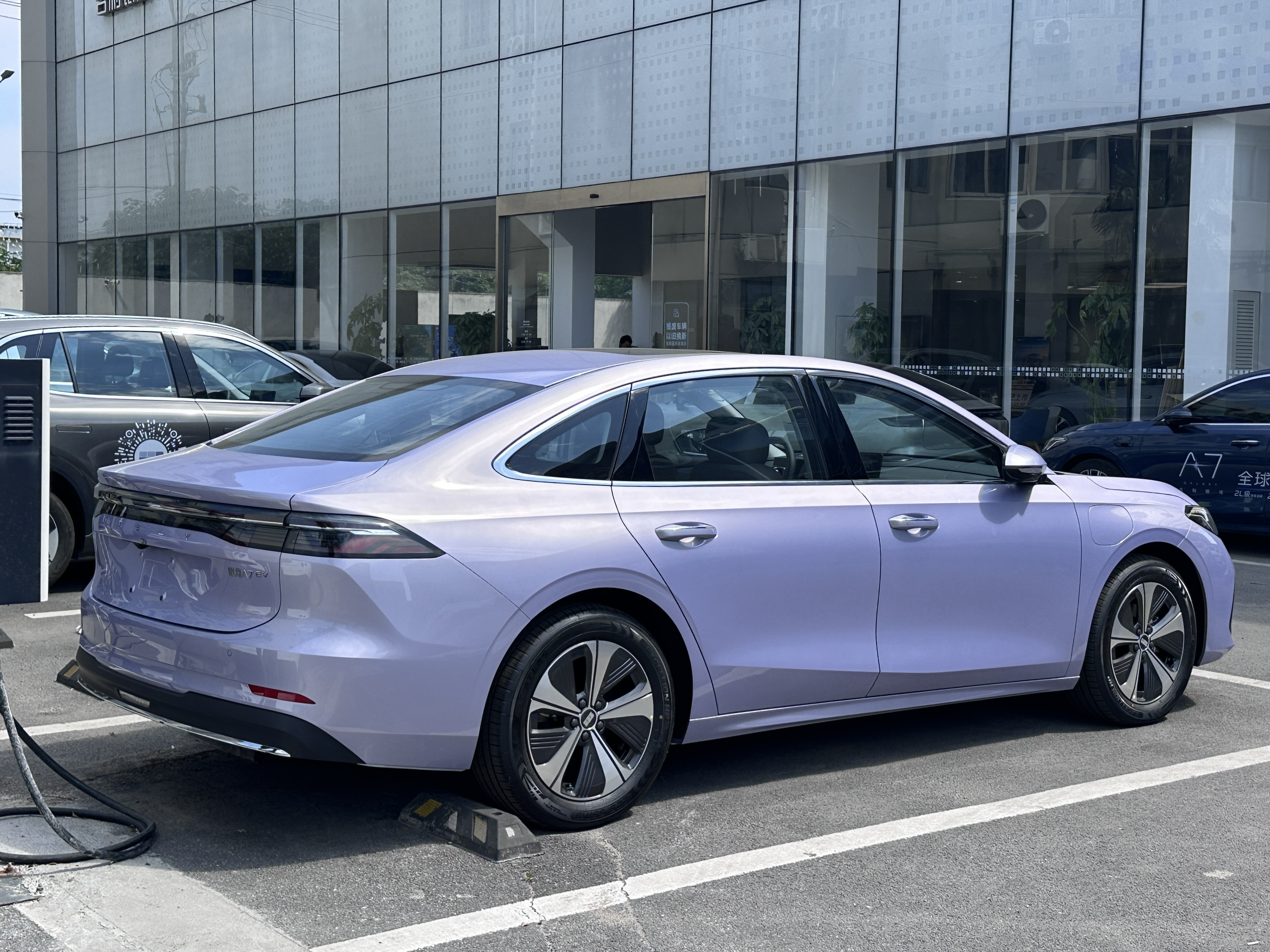
Rear view

== Powertrain ==
The A7 uses Geely's NordThor AI Electric Hybrid 2.0 plug-in hybrid system, also known as the EM-i system. It uses a 1.5 liter naturally aspirated inline 4 engine codenamed BHE15PF producing 109 horsepower paired with an electric motor producing 235 horsepower. The engine has a thermal efficiency of 47.26%, making it the most thermally efficient engine on the market. The P3 motor in the A7 is 20 metric horsepower (20 hp; 15 kW) more powerful than in the Galaxy Starship 7. The A7 is able to deliver a fuel consumption figure of just 2.67 liters per 100 kilometers.

== Sales ==
Year	China
2025	58,246
