= Global Intelligent New Energy Architecture platform =

Global Intelligent New Energy Architecture (GEA)
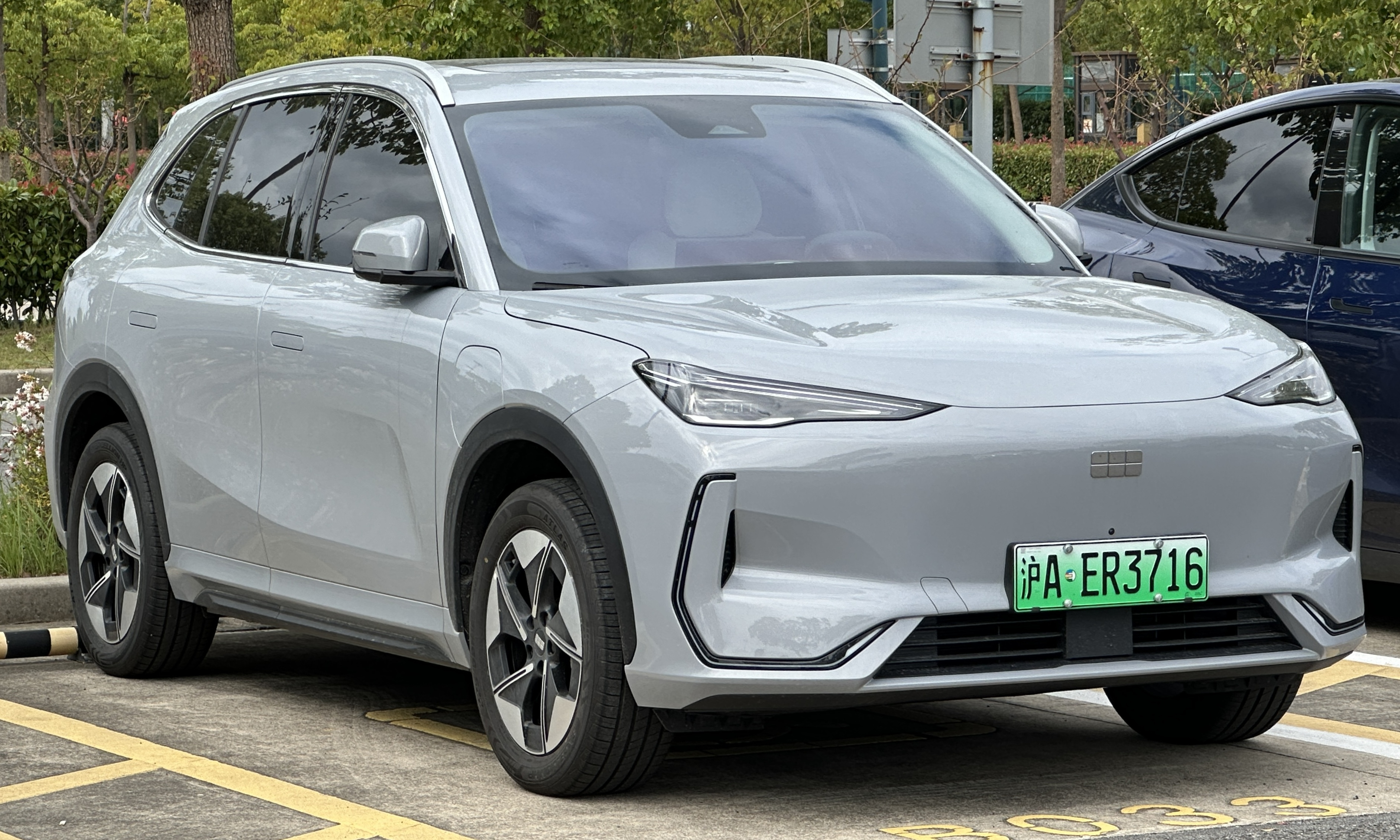
- Geely EX5, the first vehicle to use the GEA platform

Overview
- Manufacturer: Geely Holding
- Production: 2024–present

Body and chassis
- Layout: PHEV; Front-engine, front-motor, front-wheel-drive; Front-engine, Duo or tri-motor, all-wheel-drive; EV; Front motor, front-wheel drive; Rear motor, rear-wheel drive; Dual-motor, all-wheel-drive

Chronology
- Predecessor: Compact Modular Architecture

The GEA (Global Intelligent New Energy Architecture) is an automobile modular platform developed by Geely, unveiled in 2024, and designed to integrate technologies such as artificial intelligence (AI), high-performance electrification, and smart connectivity.

According to Geely, the GEA platform is the world's first architecture to integrate hardware, software, ecosystems, and AI into a unified system. This "four-in-one" approach enables vehicles to adapt to future technologies while ensuring scalability across energy types, including battery electric, plug-in hybrid, range-extender, and methanol.

In April 2025, Geely unveiled its GEA Evo architecture at the Shanghai Auto Show. Building upon the original GEA architecture, this upgraded platform enhances support for advanced configurations, including front double wishbone suspension, rear dual motors, longer wheelbase, a 3DHT transmission system, triple-drive motors, and rear axle steering. Additionally, it integrates a next-generation electronic/electrical architecture and an intelligent driving platform to further elevate performance and technological capabilities.

The platform supports vehicles ranging from compact cars to full-size SUVs, ensuring flexibility for diverse market needs. The GEA platform is evolved from CMA platform.

== Technical features ==
=== AI digital chassis ===
The platforms combines line-control steering, wheel-side electric drives, and AI algorithms to achieve cross-domain control of vehicle dynamics. It also Enables features like autonomous drifting and "active collision avoidance," ensuring stability across extreme road conditions.

=== Electrification powertrain ===
The GEA platform applies Geely's self-developed LFP battery, the Shen Dun Blade Battery, and can also support Lei Shen EM-i Super Hybrid System, which achieves 46.5% thermal efficiency, enabling a 2L/100km fuel economy and 2,000km combined range.

=== Smart ecosystem integration ===
The platform connects vehicles to an AI ecosystem incorporating multi-modal AI generation (AIGC), which enables autonomous driving. All the GEA platform vehicles will equip with Flyme Auto OS.

== Applications ==
=== GEA ===
Vehicles using platform:

- Geely Xingyuan/EX2/E2 (E22H) (2024–present)
  - Proton eMas 5 (E22H) (2025–present)
- Geely Galaxy E5 / Geely EX5/E5 (E245) (2024–present)
  - Proton eMas 7 (E245) (2025–present)
- Geely Galaxy Starship 7 / Geely Starray/EX5/E5 EM-i (P145) (2024–present)
  - Proton eMas 7 PHEV (P145) (2026–present)
- Geely Galaxy Starshine 6 (P161) (2025–present)
- Geely Galaxy A7 (P181) (2025–present)
- Geely Galaxy Starshine 7 (P182) (2026–present)
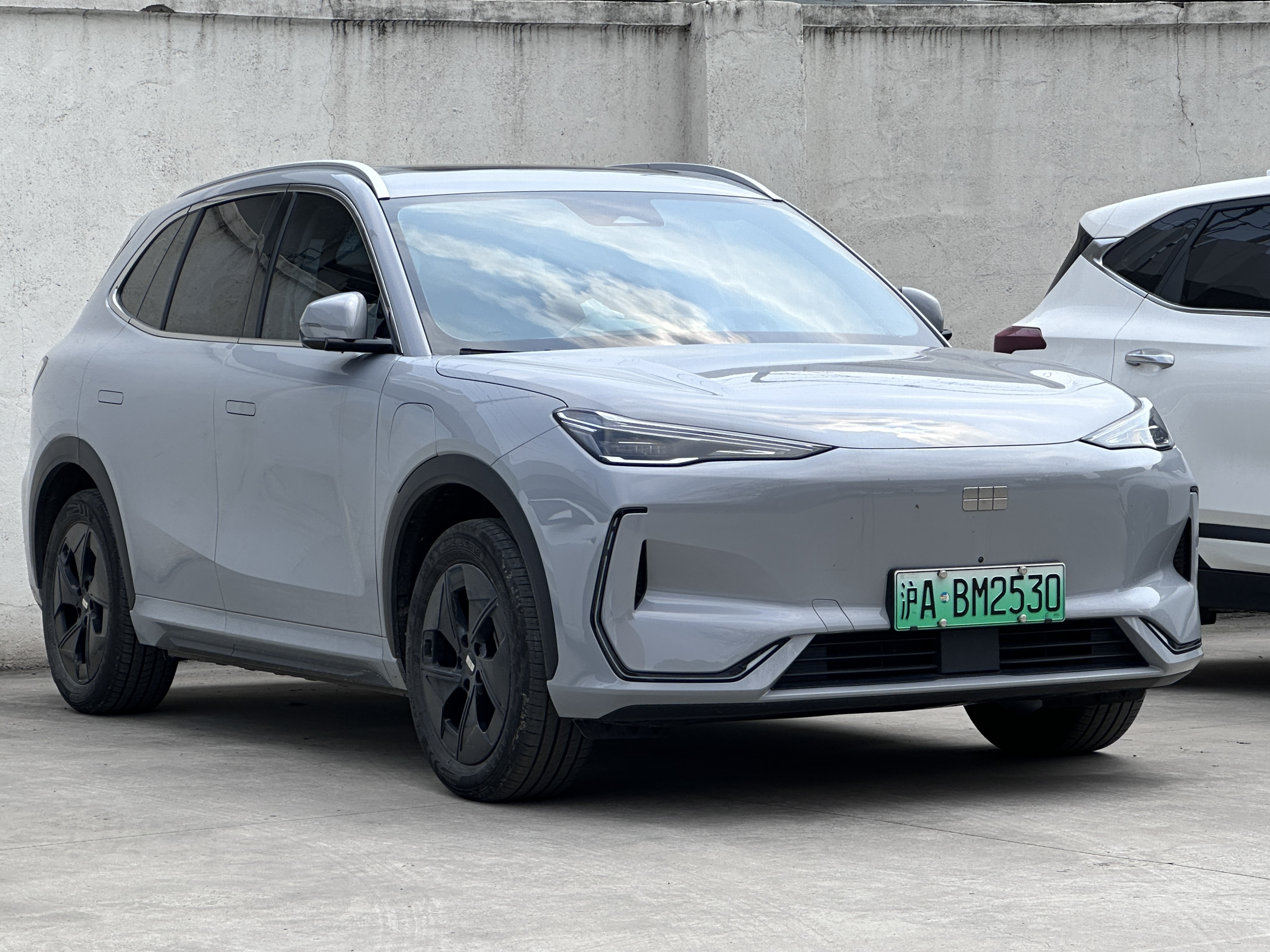
Geely Galaxy E5

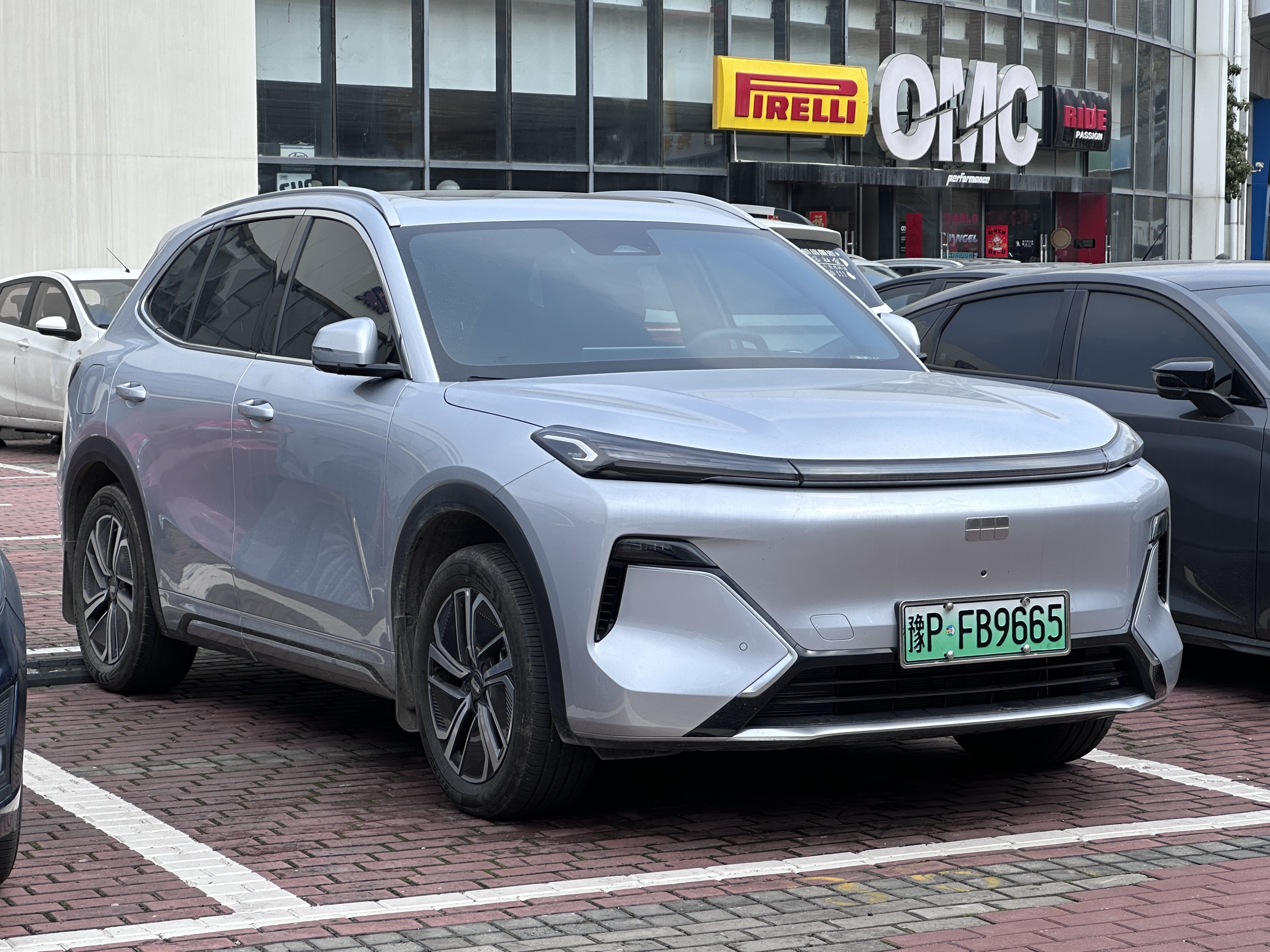
Geely Galaxy Starship 7

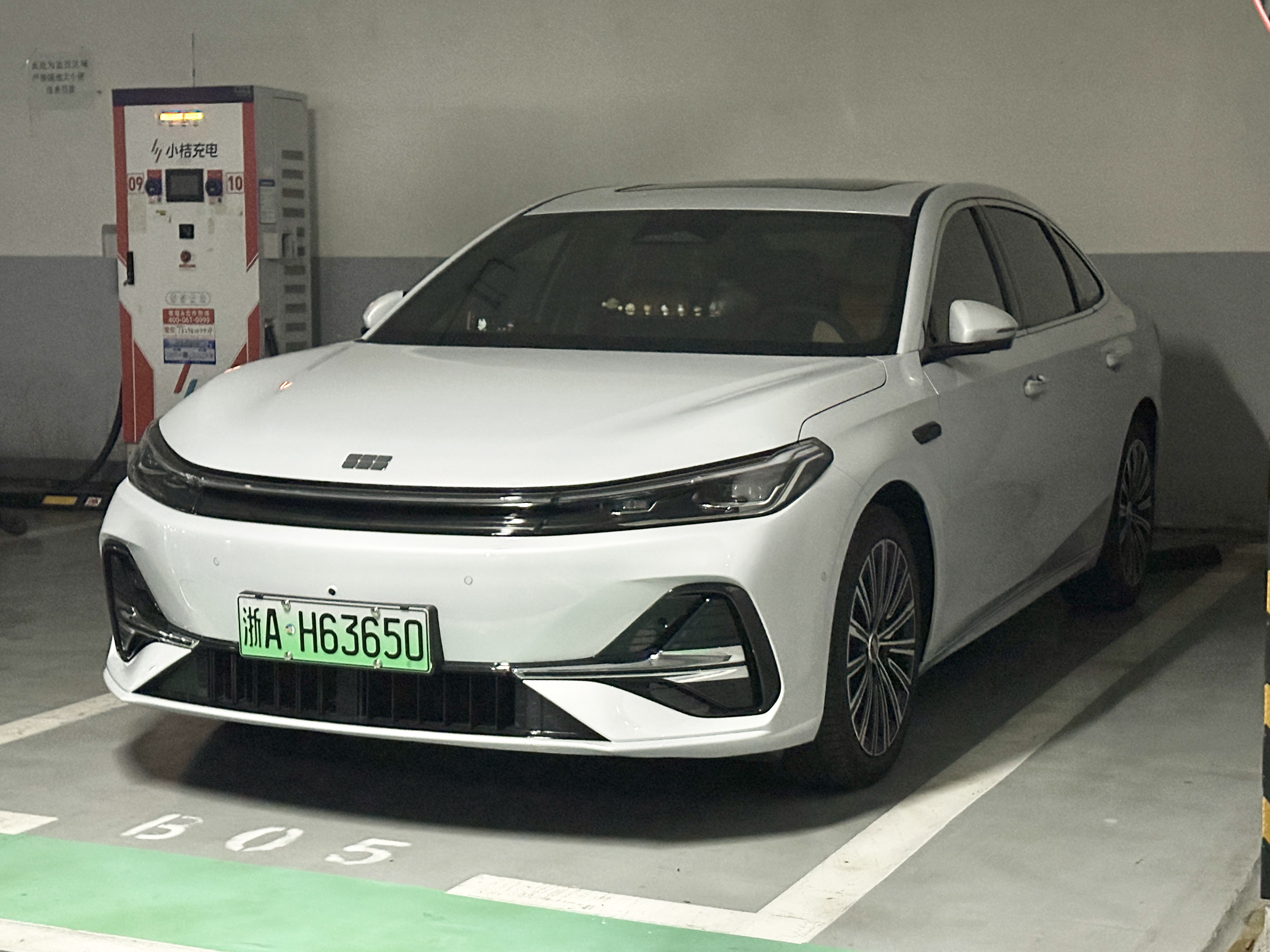
Geely Galaxy A7

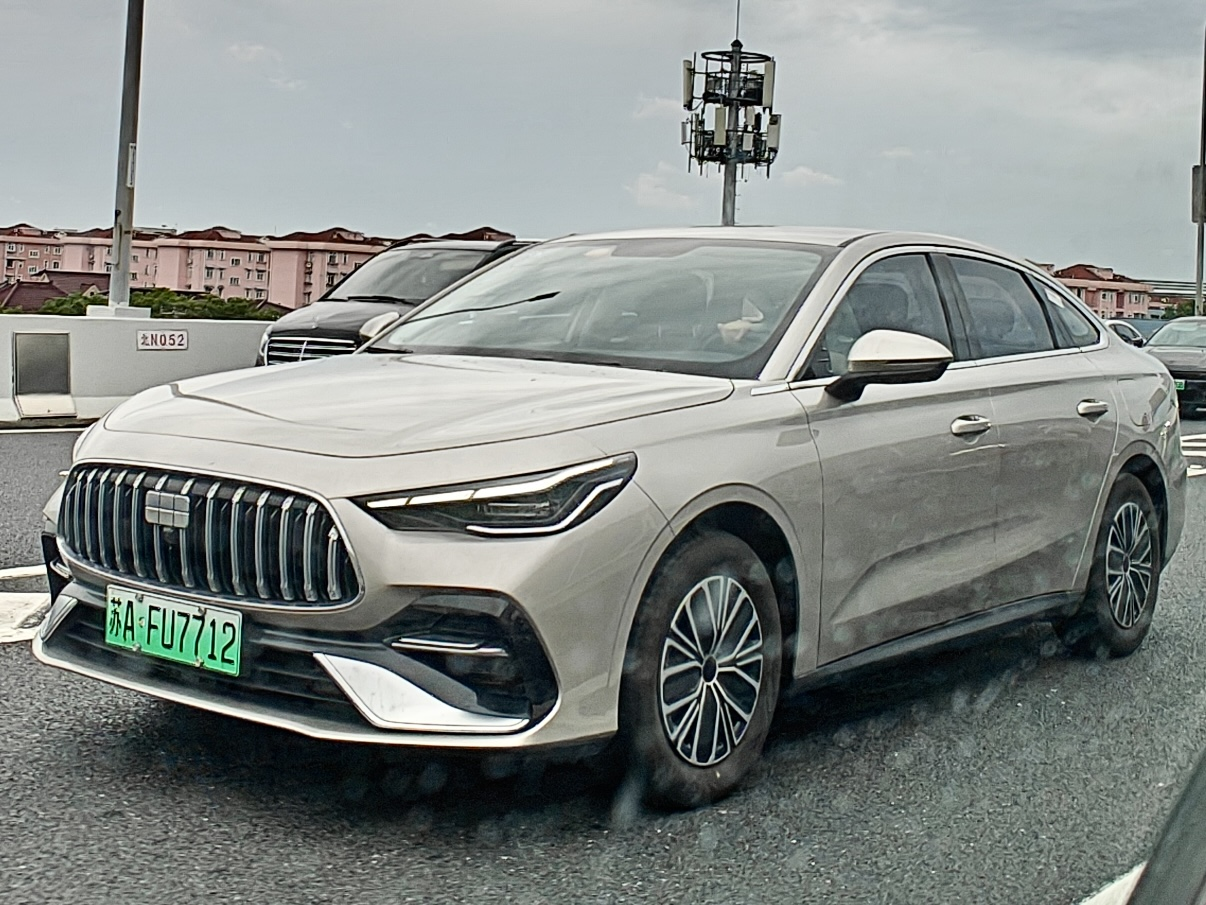
Geely Galaxy Starshine 6

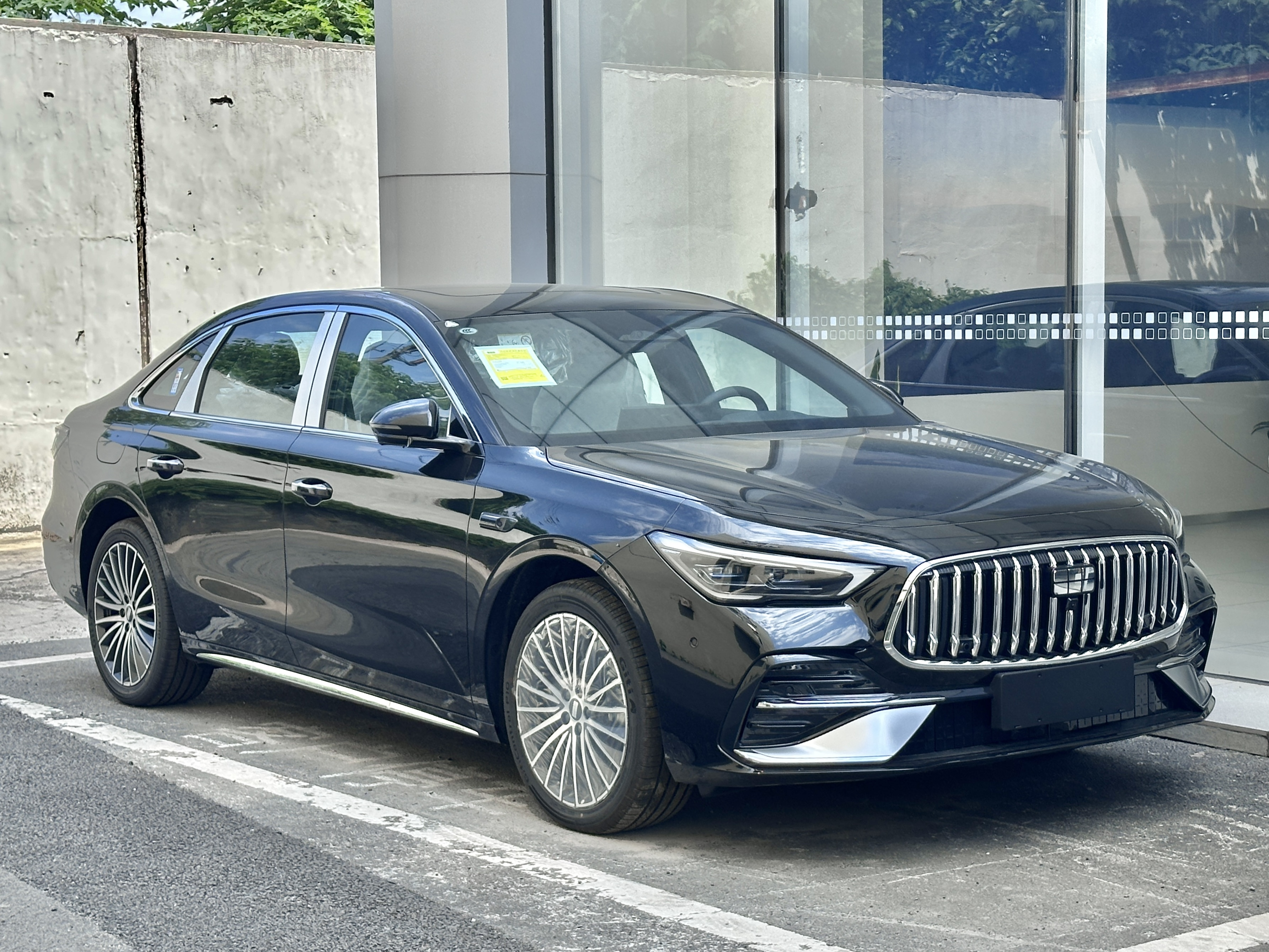
Geely Galaxy Starshine 7

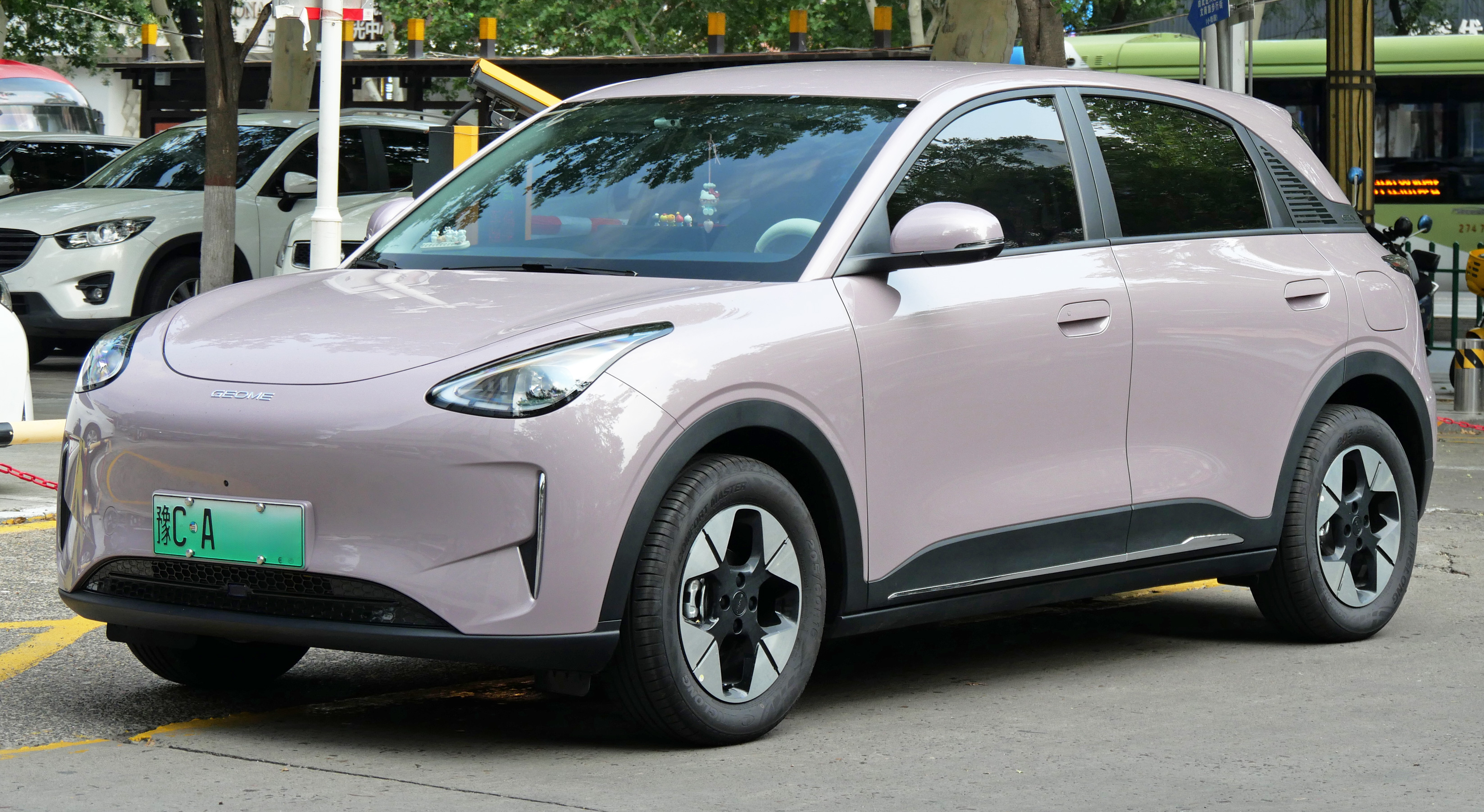
Geely Xingyuan

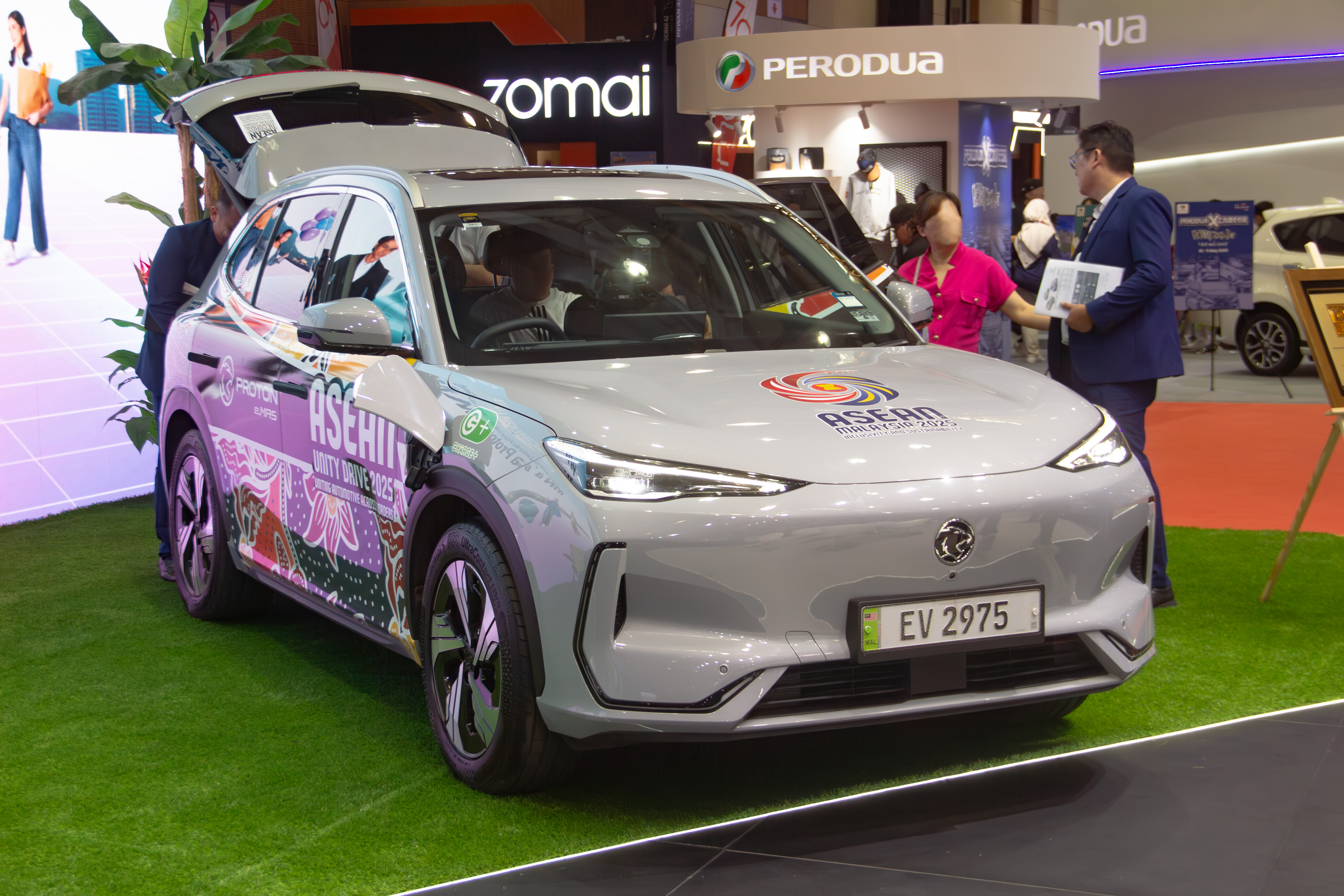
Proton eMas 7

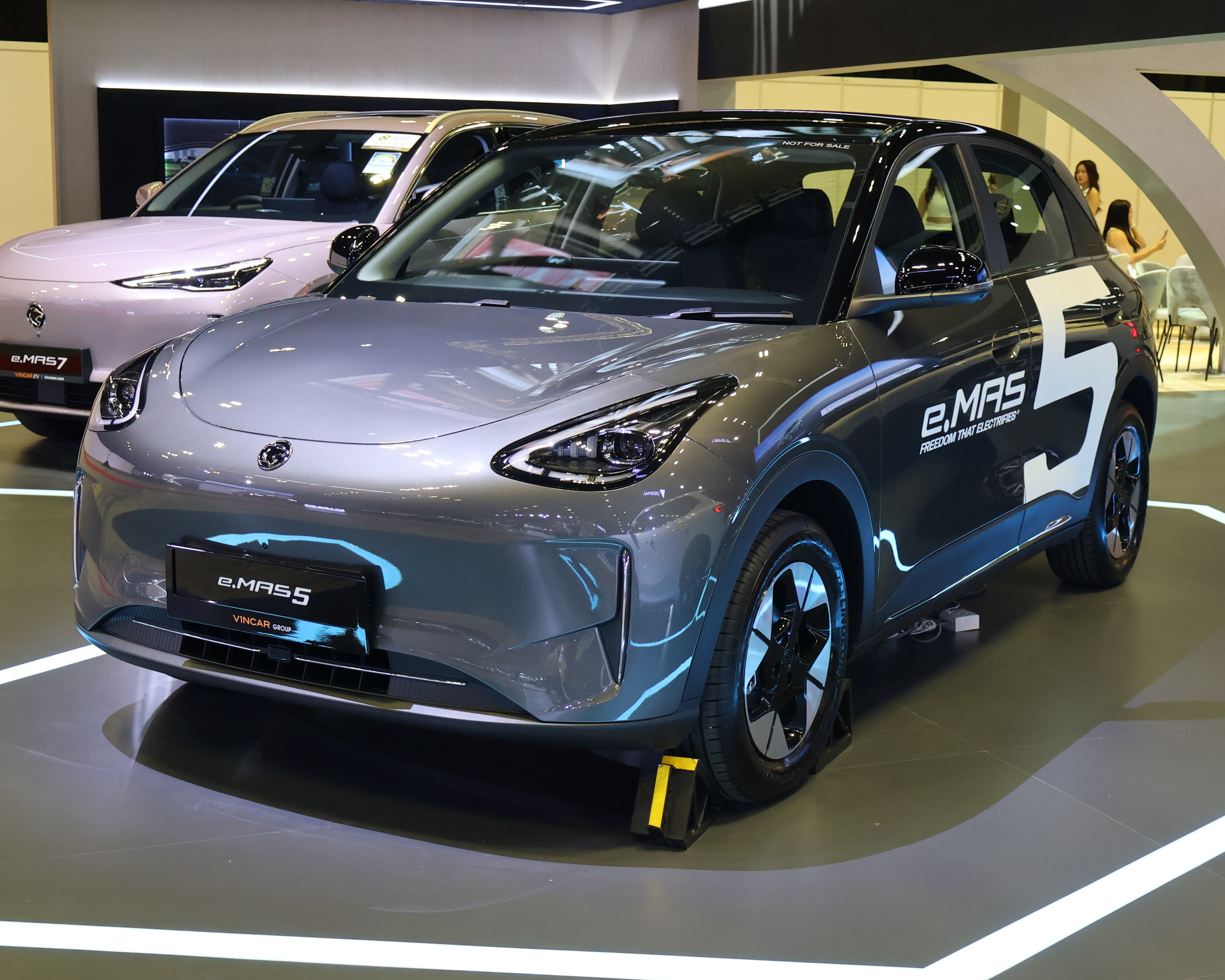
Proton eMas 5

=== GEA Evo (CMA 3.0) ===
Vehicles using platform:

- Geely Galaxy M9 (P117) (2025–present)
- Geely Galaxy Starshine 8 (P171) (2025–present)
- Geely Galaxy V900 (2026–present)
- Geely Galaxy M7 (2026–present)
- Geely Monjaro EM-i
- Lynk & Co 10 (P372) (2025–present)
- Smart #5 EHD (2025–present)
- Smart #6 (2026–present)
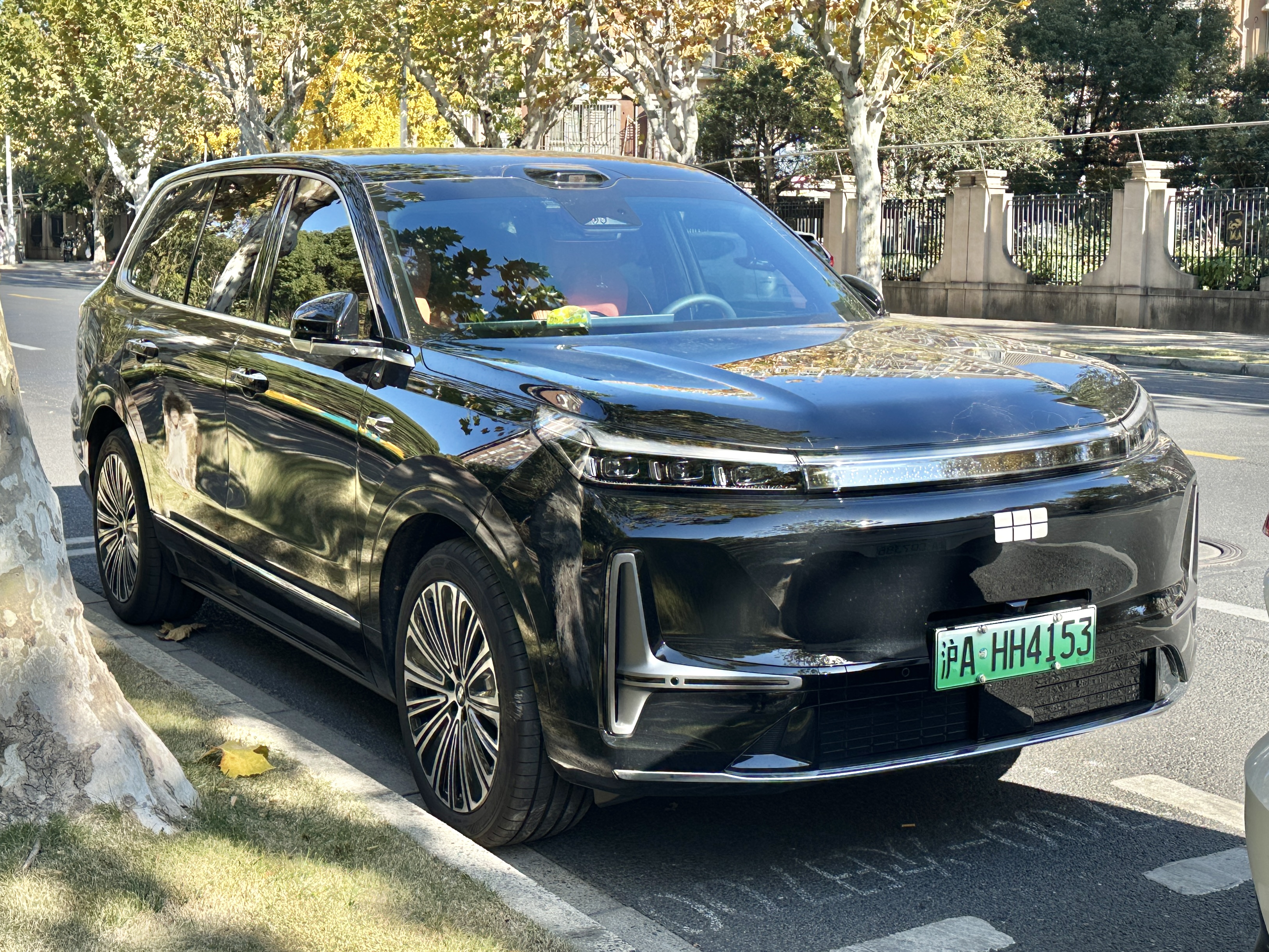
Geely Galaxy M9

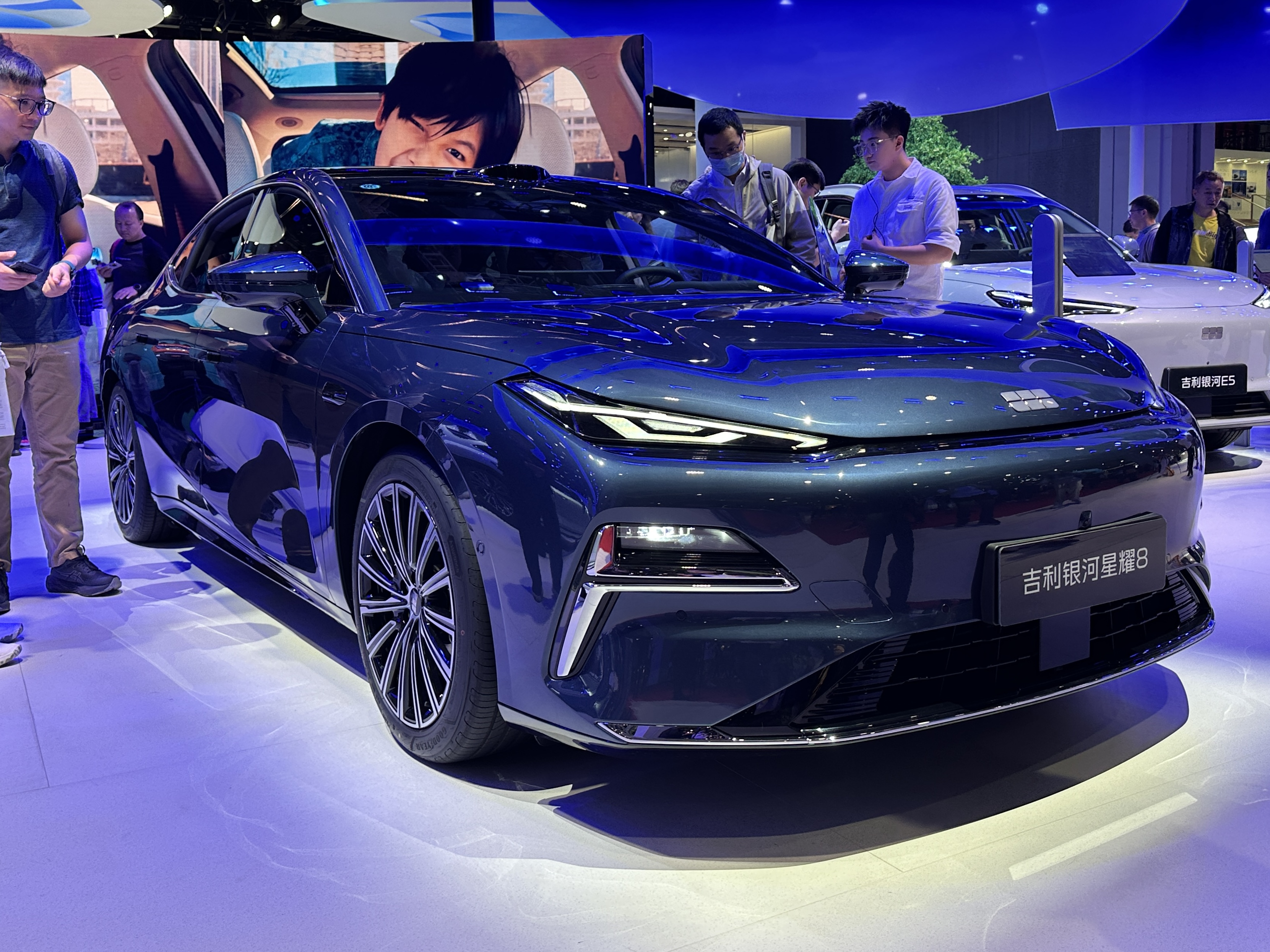
Geely Galaxy Starshine 8

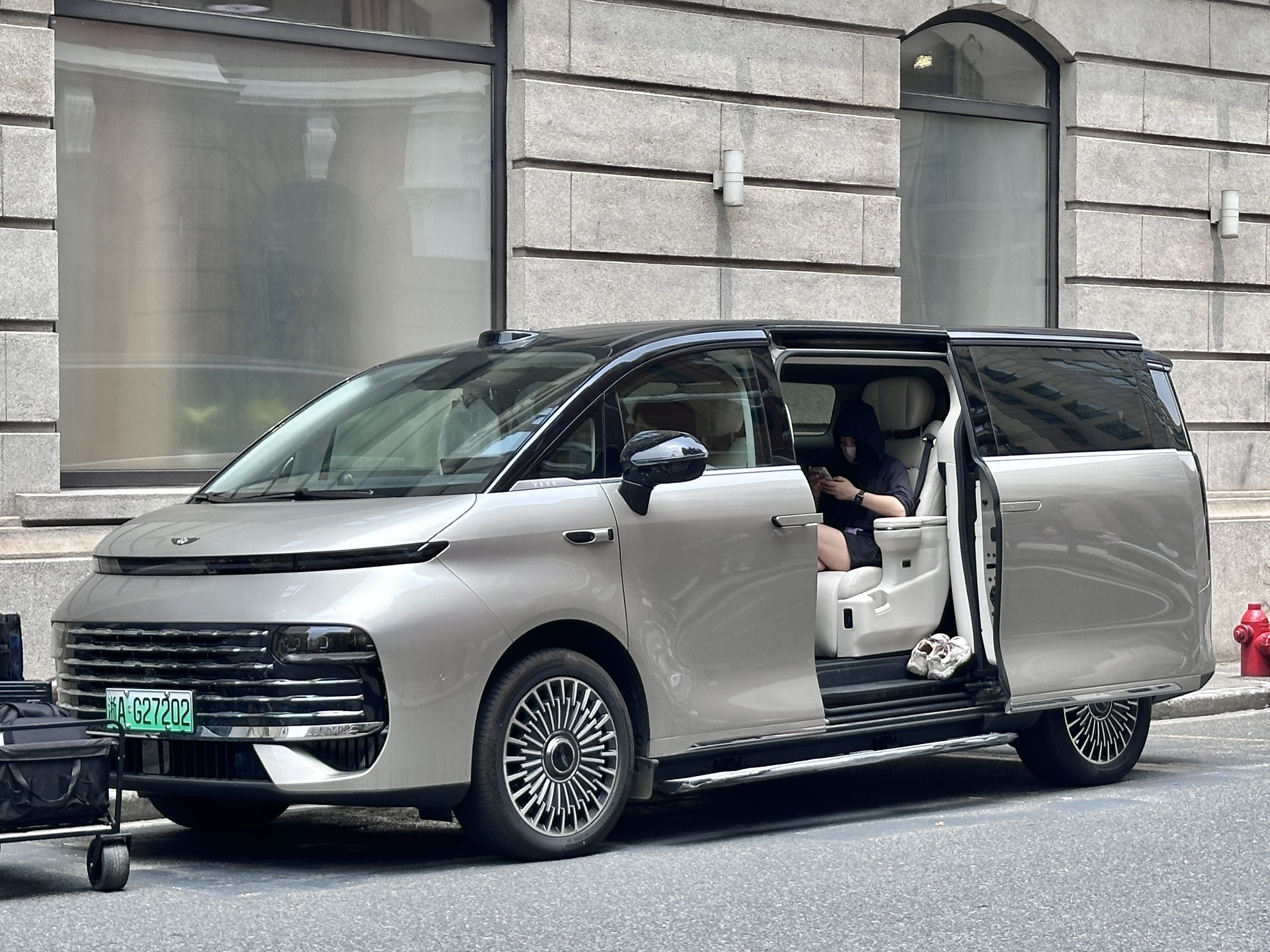
Geely Galaxy V900

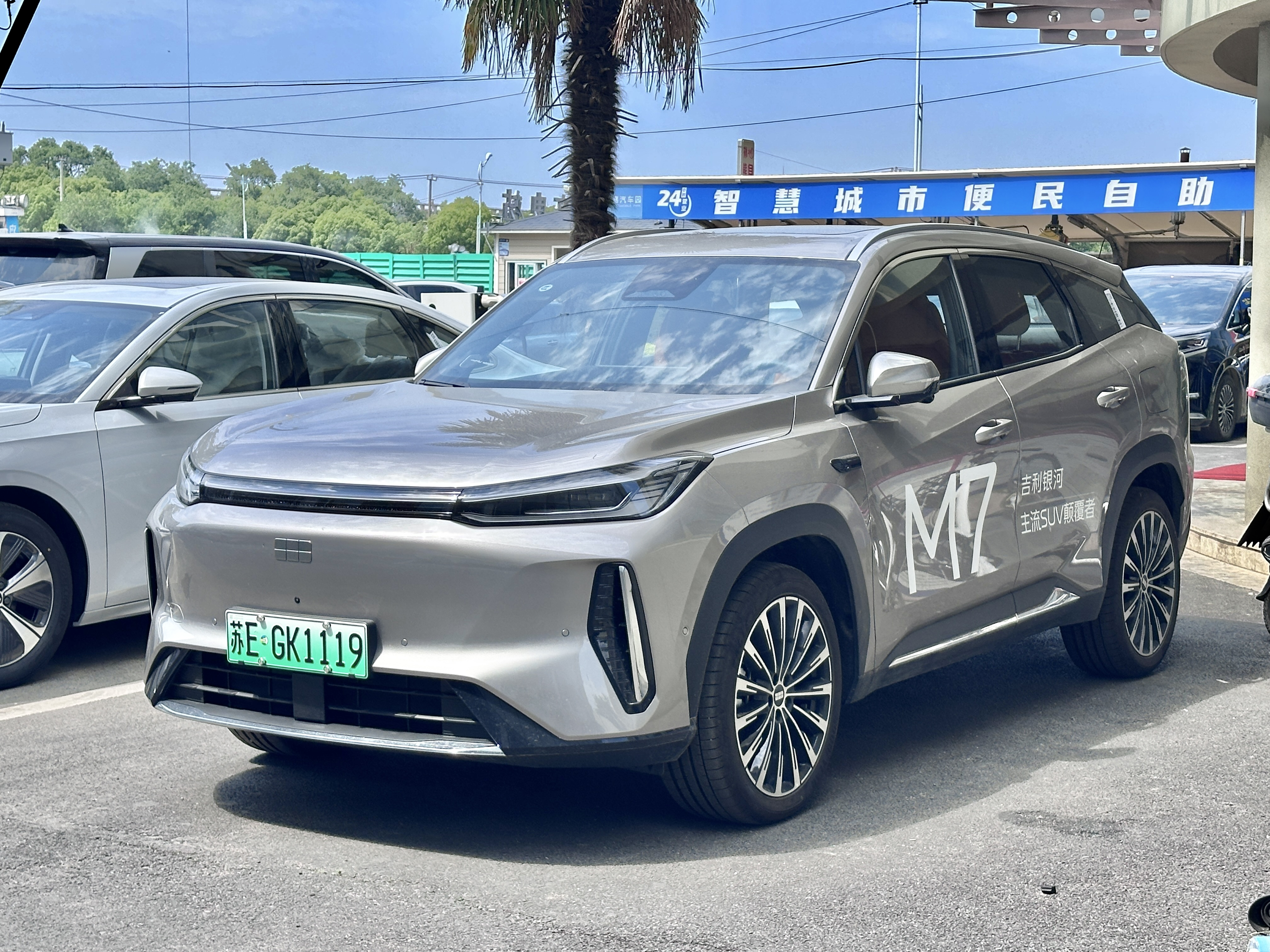
Geely Galaxy M7

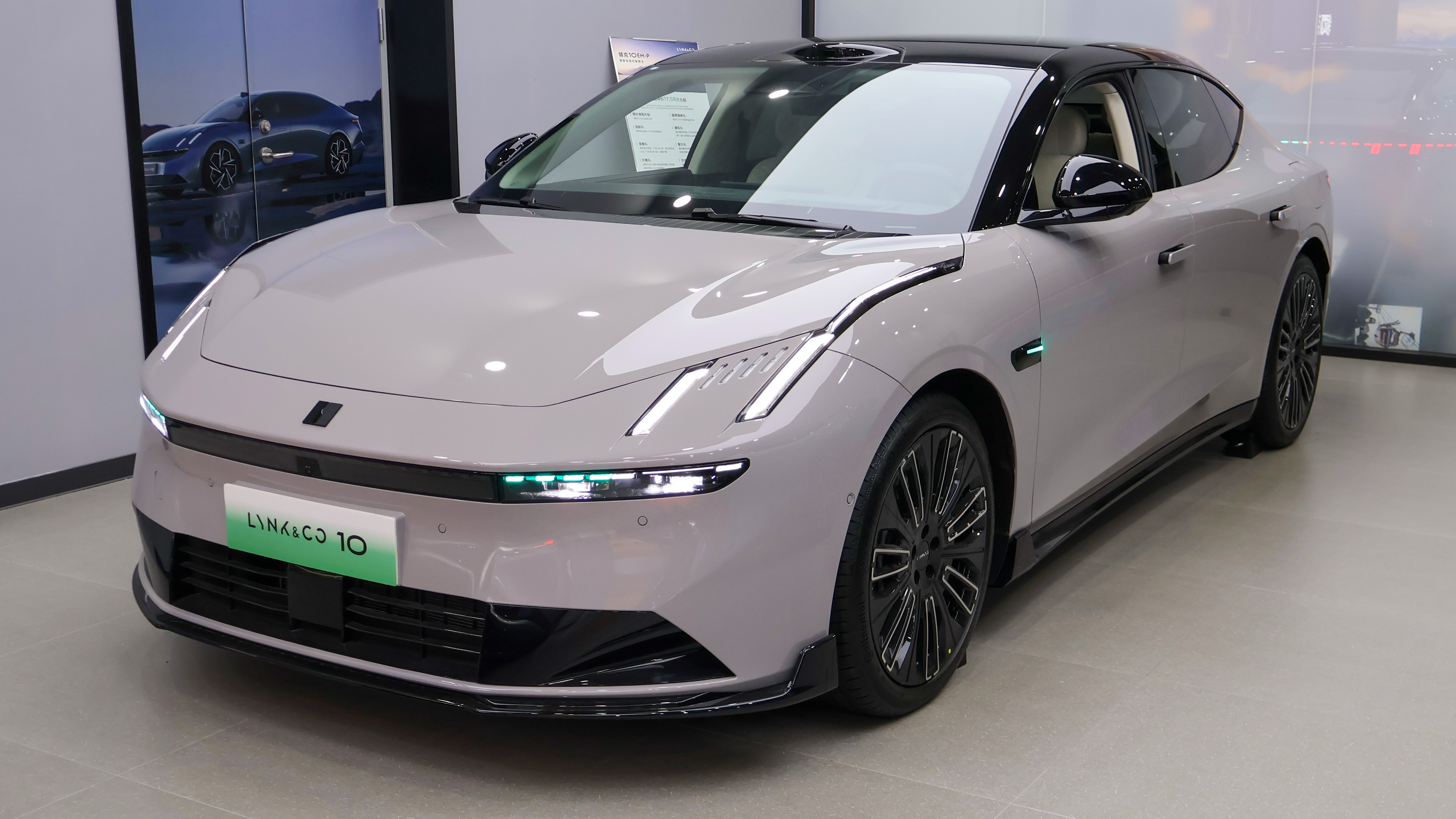
Lynk & Co 10 EM-P

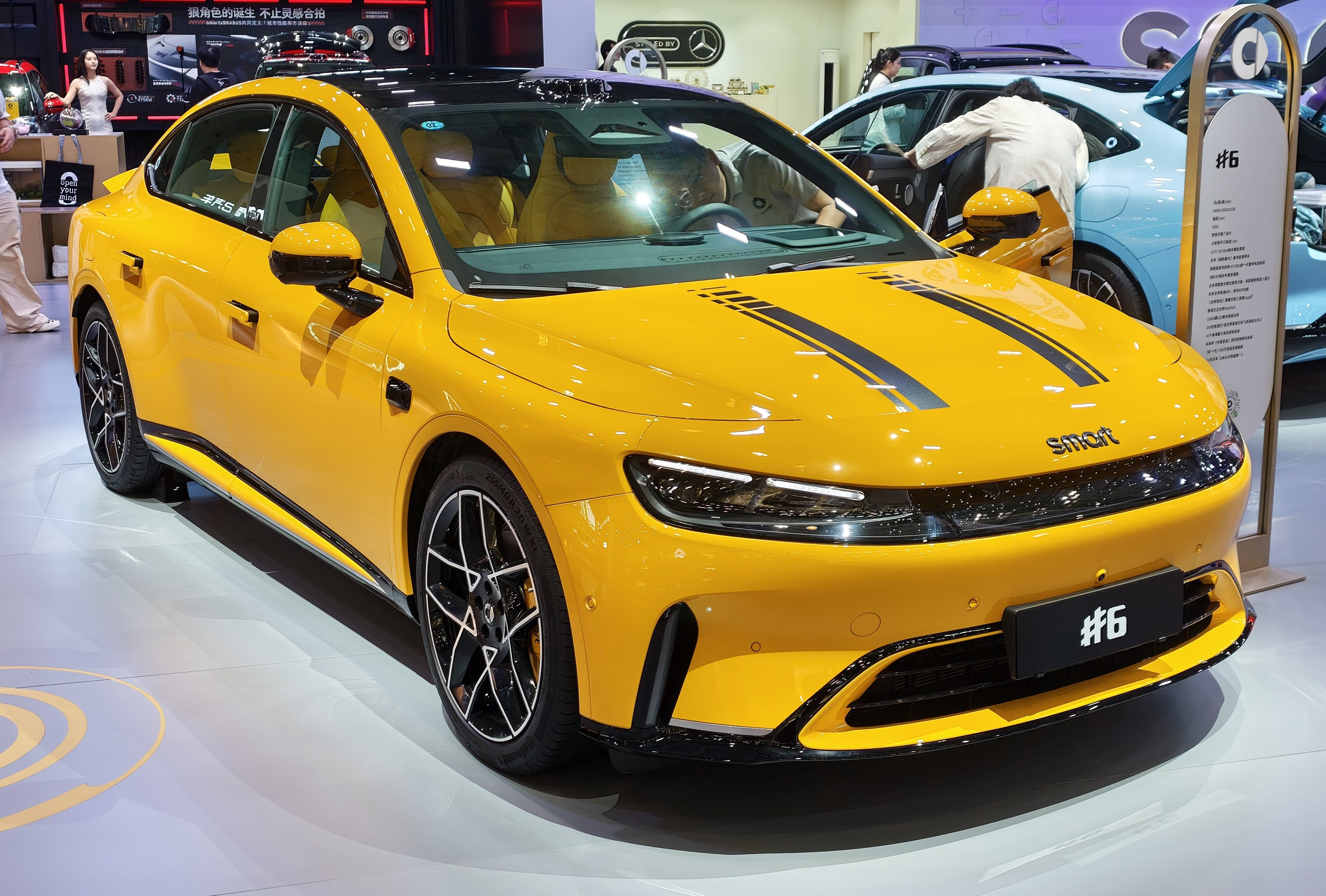
Smart #6

== See also ==
- SPA – Scalable Product Architecture platform
- SEA – Sustainable Experience Architecture platform
- CMA – Compact Modular Architecture platform
  - SMA – Scalable Modular Architecture
- BMA – B-segment Modular Architecture platform
