= Geely Galaxy M7 =

Plug-in hybrid compact crossover SUV

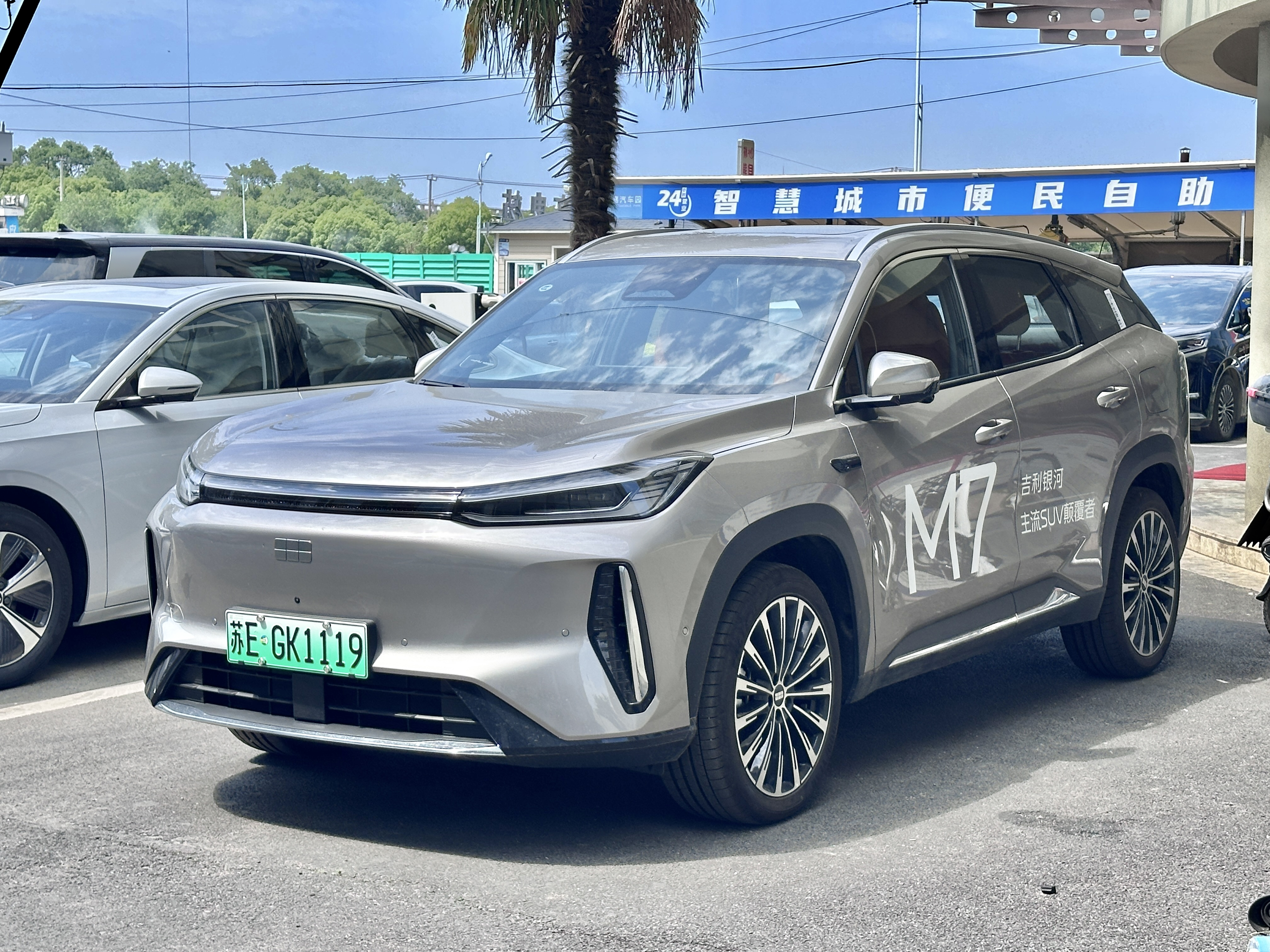

Overview
- Manufacturer: Geely Auto
- Production: March 2026 – present
- Assembly: China: Baoji, Shaanxi

Body and chassis
- Class: Compact crossover SUV
- Body style: 5-door SUV
- Layout: Front-engine, front-wheel-drive
- Platform: Global Intelligent New Energy Architecture (GEA)
- Related: Geely Galaxy L7; Geely Galaxy M9; Geely Galaxy Starshine 8; Geely Galaxy V900

Powertrain
- Engine: Petrol plug-in hybrid: 1.5 L BHE15-BFN I4
- Electric motor: Permanent magnet synchronous motor
- Transmission: 1-speed E-DHT (EM-i)
- Hybrid drivetrain: Plug-in hybrid
- Battery: 18.4 kWh LFP; 29.8 kWh LFP
- Electric range: 101–155 km (63–96 mi) (CLTC)

Dimensions
- Wheelbase: 2,785 mm (109.6 in)
- Length: 4,770 mm (187.8 in)
- Width: 1,905 mm (75.0 in)
- Height: 1,785 mm (70.3 in)
- Curb weight: 1,810–1,870 kg (3,990–4,123 lb)

Chronology
- Predecessor: Geely Galaxy L7

The Geely Galaxy M7 (Chinese: 吉利银河M7; pinyin: Jílì Yínhé M7) is a plug-in hybrid compact crossover SUV manufactured by Geely Auto under the Geely Galaxy marque. It is a based and successor to the Geely Galaxy L7 and is based on Geely's Global Intelligent New Energy Architecture (GEA) platform.

== Overview ==
Images of the Galaxy M7 were first released in December 2025. The M7 was officially unveiled on 6 February 2026 at an event held in Milan, Italy. Series production commenced in March 2026, with a market launch in April 2026.

The Galaxy M7 is based on the Galaxy L7 that uses an older platform. It has been updated to the GEA platform, which introduces revised body and chassis architecture. Compared to the L7, the M7 is 70 millimetres (2.8 in) longer at 4,770 millimetres (187.8 in) while retaining the same 2,785 millimetres (109.6 in) wheelbase.

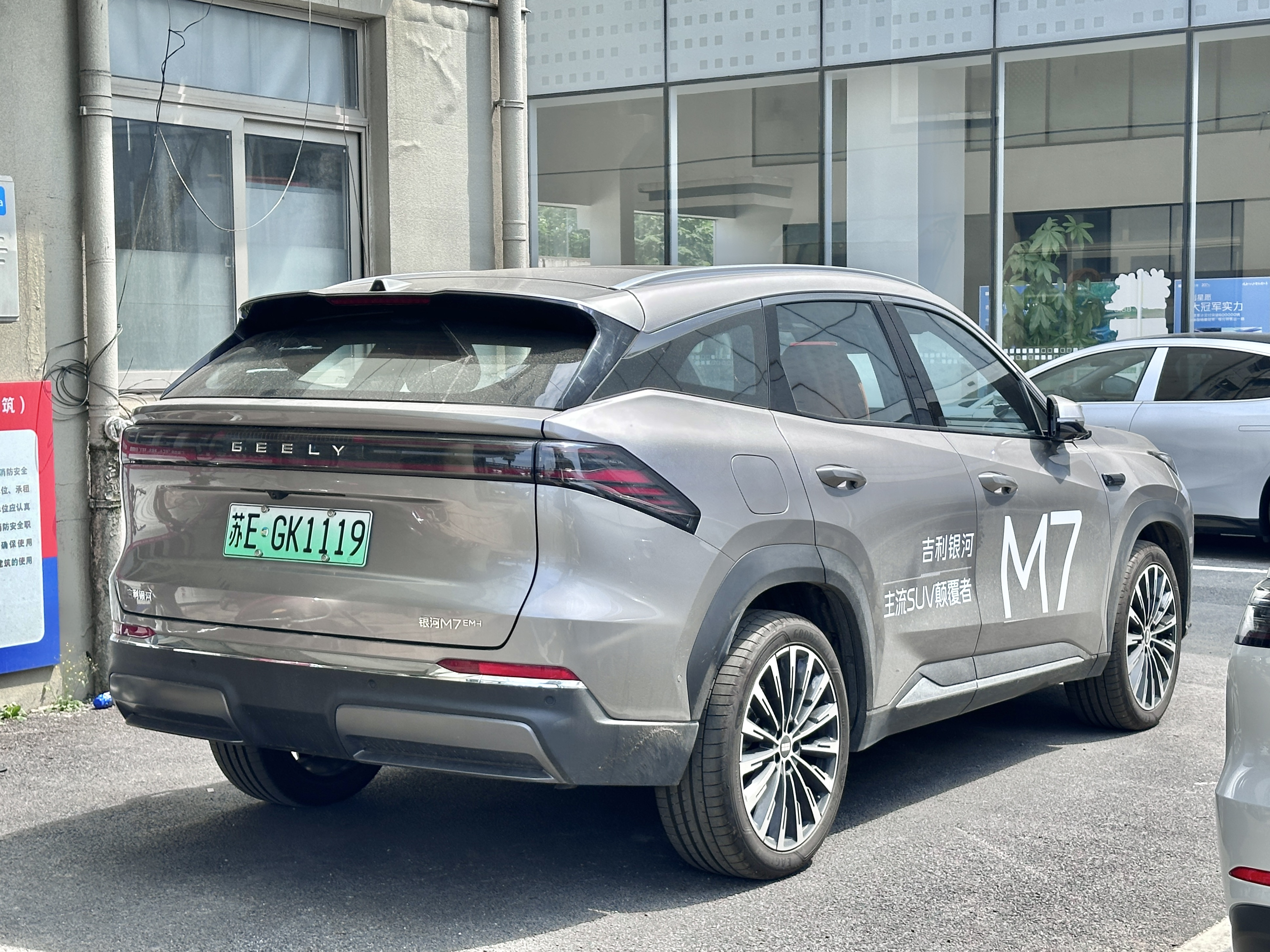
Rear view

== Powertrain ==
The M7 uses Geely EM-i series hybrid system as its sole powertrain, using a 1.5-litre naturally aspirated petrol engine with a front-mounted permanent magnet synchronous motor and a single-speed dedicated hybrid transmission. The system claims a combined range of 1,730 km.

The M7 is available with two battery pack options. The standard 18.4 kWh LFP pack weighs 183 kg (403 lb) and provides a claimed CLTC all-electric range of 101 km (63 mi). The extended 29.8 kWh LFP pack weighs 225 kg (496 lb) and provides 155 km (96 mi) of CLTC all-electric range.

Engine / Motor	Power	Torque	Transmission
Engine: 1.5 L (1,499 cc) BHE15-BFN I4 petrol Front motor: PMSM	Engine: 82 kW (110 hp); Front motor: 160 kW (215 hp)	Engine: 136 N⋅m (100 lb⋅ft); Front motor: 262 N⋅m (193 lb⋅ft)	1-speed DHT (EM-i)
