= Geely Galaxy Starshine 6 =

Plug-in hybrid mid-size sedan

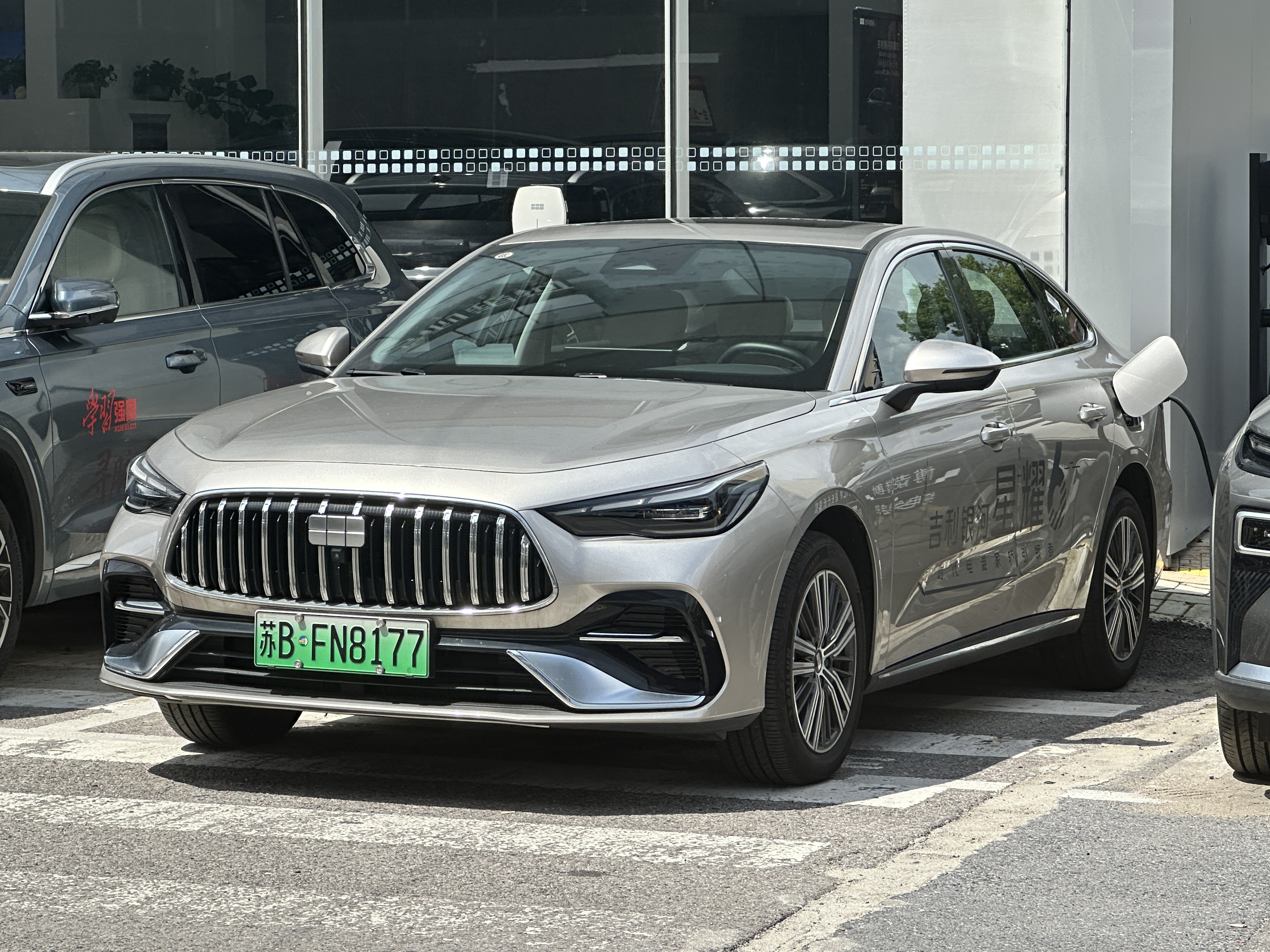
- Geely Galaxy Starshine 6 in Shanghai

Overview
- Manufacturer: Geely Auto
- Model code: P161
- Also called: Geely Emgrand EM-i (export)
- Production: 2025–present
- Assembly: China: Huzhou, Zhejiang

Body and chassis
- Class: Mid-size car (D)
- Body style: 4-door sedan
- Layout: Front-engine, front-motor, front-wheel-drive
- Platform: Global Intelligent New Energy Architecture (GEA)
- Related: Geely Emgrand (fifth generation)

Powertrain
- Engine: Petrol plug-in hybrid: 1.5 L BHE15-BFN I4
- Hybrid drivetrain: Plug-in hybrid
- Battery: 8.5 – 28.3 kWh LFP from CALB
- Electric range: 100 km (62 mi)

Dimensions
- Wheelbase: 2,756 mm (108.5 in)
- Length: 4,806 mm (189.2 in)
- Width: 1,886 mm (74.3 in)
- Height: 1,490 mm (58.7 in)
- Curb weight: 1,505–1,580 kg (3,318–3,483 lb)

The Geely Galaxy Starshine 6 (Chinese: 吉利银河星耀6; pinyin: Jílì Yínhe Xīngyào 6) is a plug-in hybrid mid-size sedan manufactured by Geely Auto under the Geely Galaxy marque.

== Overview ==
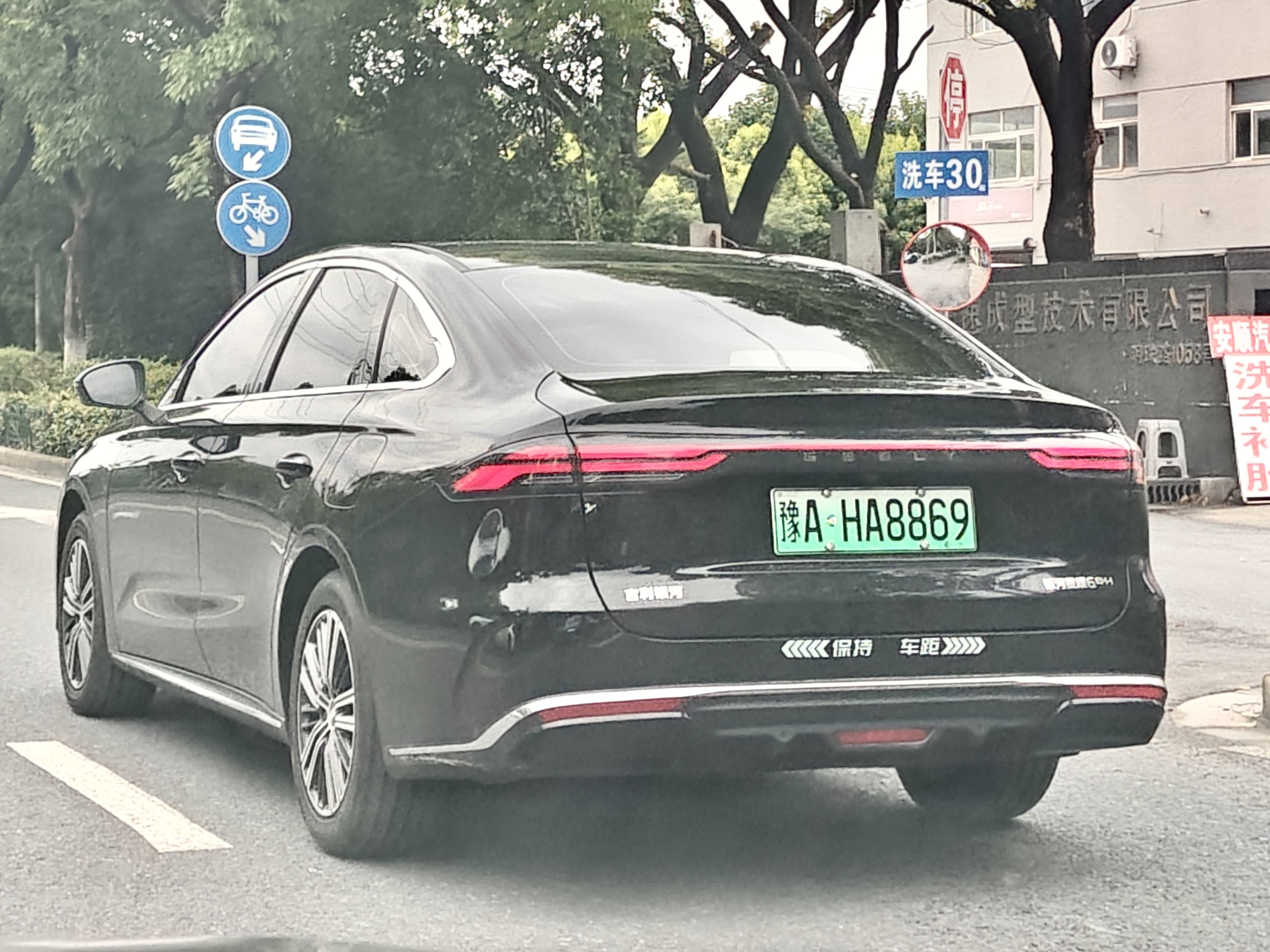
Rear

The Starshine 6 is positioned as a plug-in hybrid version of the fifth-generation Geely Emgrand. Its dimensions are similar to that of the Geely Galaxy L6. It went on sale on October 2nd, 2025, with 5 trim levels available.

=== Design and features ===
The Starshine 6 uses a chrome-plated grille and headlights reminiscent of the mainline Geely models, with news outlets likening it to Mercedes-AMG models. A decently-sized air intake is present on the Starshine 6 alongside a light bar at the back. It uses traditional door handles like the L7 and Starship 7. The Starshine 6 is expected to come with 16 and 17 inch wheels.

The interior of the Starshine 6 uses a 10.2-inch dashboard with a 14.6-inch central touchscreen running Flyme Auto.

== Powertrain and chassis ==
The Starshine 6 adopts the EM-i 2.0 AI Hybrid system pairing a 1.5 liter naturally aspirated inline 4 known as the BHE15-BFN that produces 110 horsepower. No information about the electric motor is known, however the peak output of the electric motor in other models using the EM-i 2.0 AI Hybrid system is 235 horsepower. The battery is an 8.5 kWh lithium iron phosphate battery produced by CALB. The electric range of the Starshine 6 is 100 kilometers or 62 miles.

The engine is shared with the Galaxy A7.

The Starshine 6 uses MacPherson struts for the front suspension and a torsion beam axle for the rear suspension.

== Sales ==
Year	China
2025	8,251
