= Geely Xingrui =

Overview
- Manufacturer: Geely Auto
- Production: 2020–present

Body and chassis
- Class: Mid-size car (D)
- Body style: 4-door sedan

The Geely Xingrui (Chinese: 吉利星瑞; pinyin: Jílì xīng ruì) or Geely Preface is a mid-size sedan produced by Geely Auto for China since 2020. It was revealed in September 2020 at Auto China.

== First generation (FS11, 2020) ==
First generation
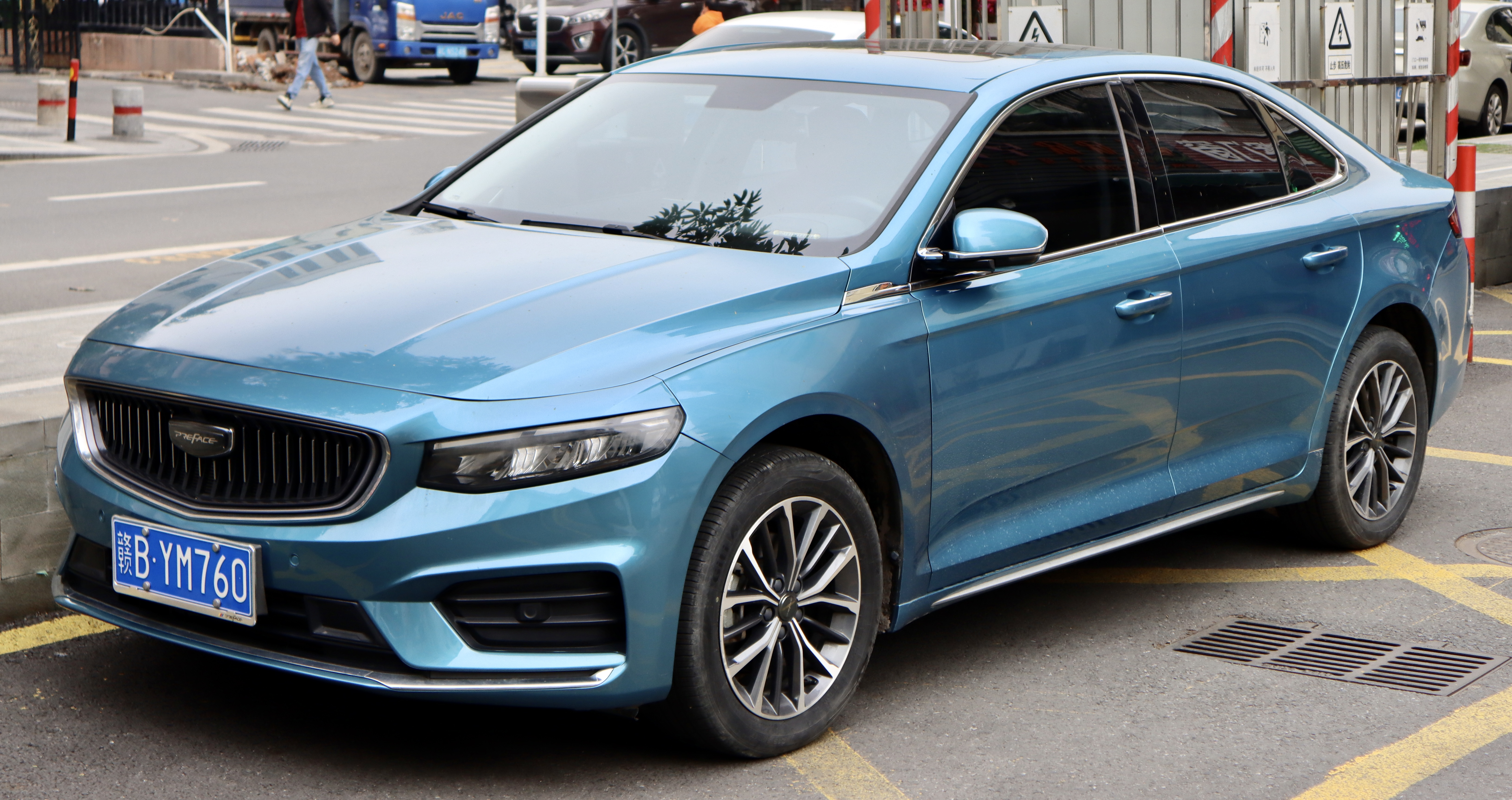

Overview
- Manufacturer: Geely Auto
- Model code: FS11
- Also called: Geely Preface; Geely Galaxy Preface (Kazakhstan); Volga C50 (Russia)
- Production: 2020–present
- Assembly: China: Luqiao, Zhejiang (Luqiao CMA Super Factory)

Body and chassis
- Class: Mid-size car (D)
- Body style: 4-door sedan
- Layout: Front-engine, front-wheel-drive
- Platform: Compact Modular Architecture

Powertrain
- Engine: Petrol: 1.5 L BHE15-EFZ turbo I4; 2.0 L JLH-4G20TD turbo I4; 2.0 L JLH-4G20TDH turbo I4; 2.0 L BHE20-PFZ turbo I4; Petrol hybrid: 1.5 L BHE15-BFN I4; 1.5 L BHE15-BFZ turbo I4; Petrol plug-in hybrid: 1.5 L BHE15-EFZ I4
- Transmission: 8-speed automatic; 7-speed 7DCT dual-clutch; 1-speed DHT; 3-speed DHT

Dimensions
- Wheelbase: 2,800 mm (110.2 in)
- Length: 4,785 mm (188.4 in); 4,825 mm (190.0 in) (facelift)
- Width: 1,869 mm (73.6 in); 1,910 mm (75.2 in) (TCR)
- Height: 1,469 mm (57.8 in); 1,460 mm (57.5 in) (TCR)
- Curb weight: 1,465–1,625 kg (3,230–3,583 lb)

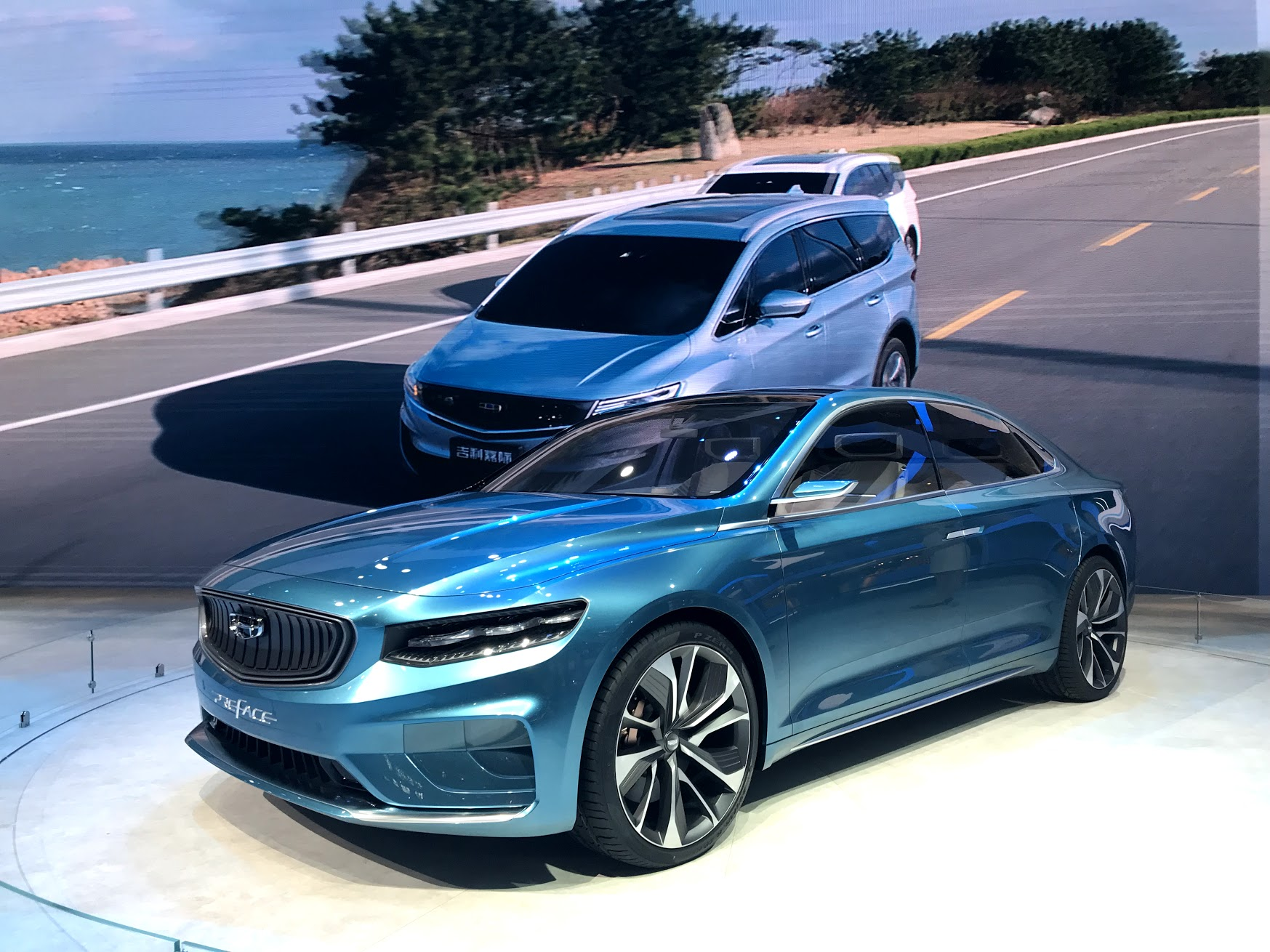
Geely Preface Concept

The Geely Xingrui was first previewed by the Preface concept at Auto Shanghai in April 2019.

The production model originally referred to as the Preface, was revealed in September 2020 at the 2020 Auto China event in Beijing, China as the Xingrui.

=== Specifications ===
The Xingrui shares the same platform, the Geely Compact Modular Architecture platform, with the Xingyue compact SUV, and the same engine, the 2.0-litre Volvo JLH-4G20TD, with the Lynk & Co 02 compact SUV that produces 187 hp (139 kW; 190 PS) and 300 N⋅m (221 lb⋅ft; 31 kg⋅m) of torque. Since 2023, Geely started to offer a 1.5-litre trim that could produce 181 PS (133 kW; 179 hp) and 290 N⋅m (214 lb⋅ft; 30 kg⋅m).

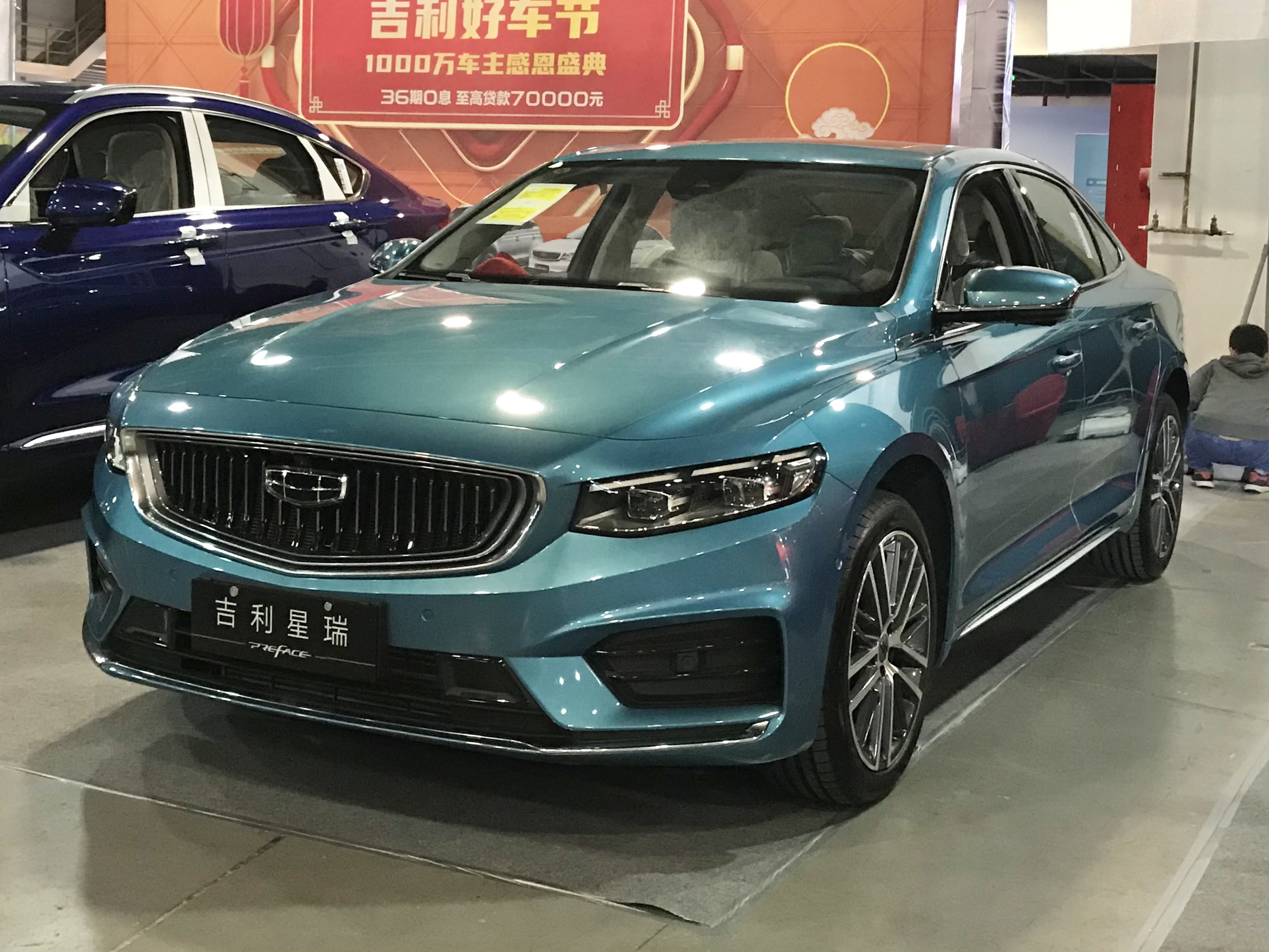
Geely Xingrui

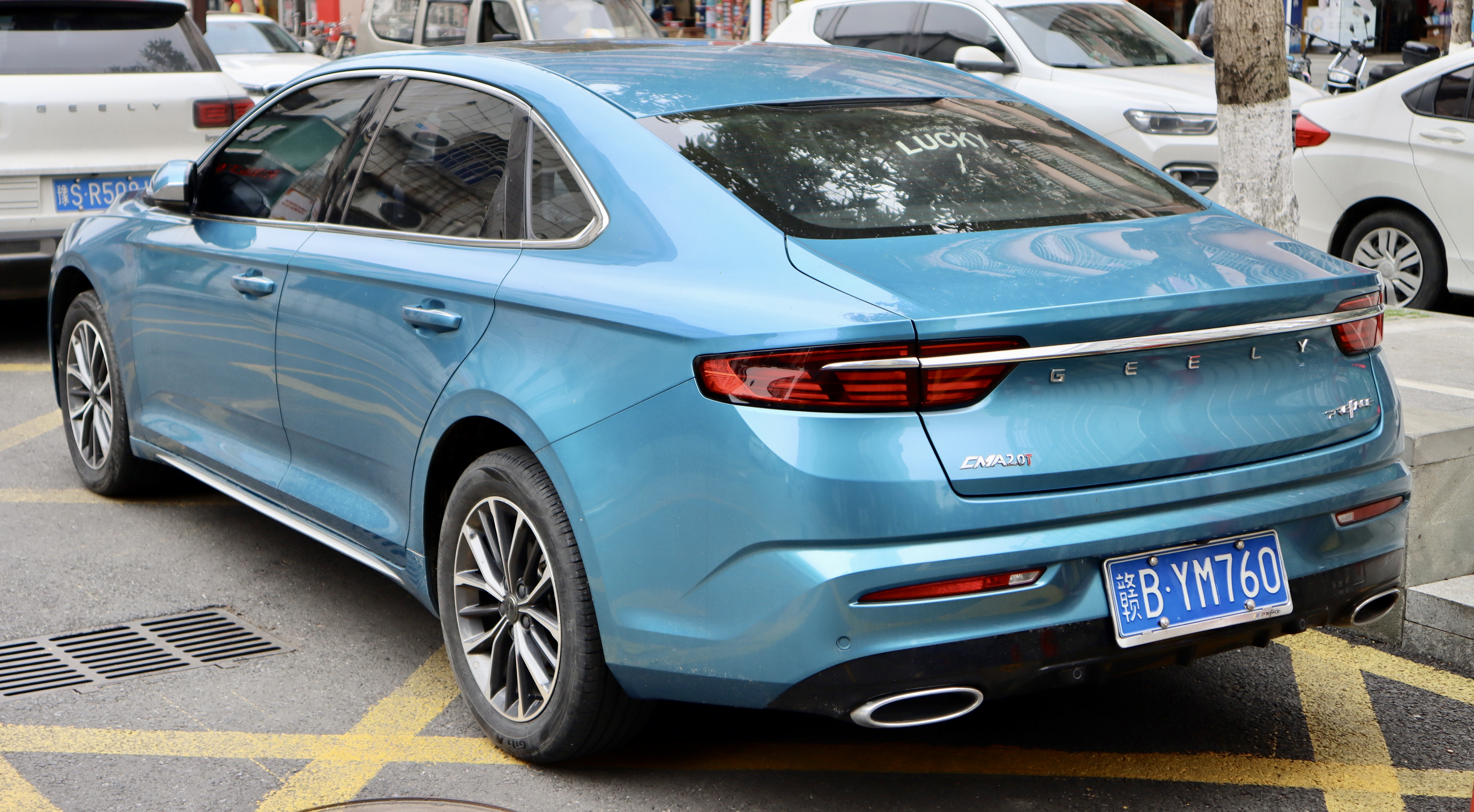
Rear view

Powertrains
Engine		Power		Torque	Transmission
Type	Code	Peak	Net	Torque	Transmission
1.5 L (1,499 cc) turbo I4	BHE15-EFZ	179 hp (133 kW; 181 PS)	172 hp (128 kW; 174 PS)	290 N⋅m (214 lb⋅ft)	7-speed DCT
2.0 L (1,969 cc) turbo I4	JLH-4G20TDH	268 hp (200 kW; 272 PS)	262 hp (195 kW; 266 PS)	400 N⋅m (295 lb⋅ft)	8-speed auto
2.0 L (1,999 cc) turbo I4	BHE20-PFZ	286 hp (213 kW; 290 PS)	275 hp (205 kW; 279 PS)		8-speed auto
Hybrid (i-HEV)
1.5 L (1,499 cc) I4	BHE15-BFN	110 hp (82 kW; 112 PS) @6,000rpm	106 hp (79 kW; 107 PS) @6,000rpm	136 N⋅m (100 lb⋅ft)	1-speed DHT
1.5 L (1,499 cc) turbo I4	BHE15-BFZ	161 hp (120 kW; 163 PS) @5,500rpm	154 hp (115 kW; 156 PS) @5,500rpm	255 N⋅m (188 lb⋅ft) @2,500–4,000rpm	3-speed DHT

=== Geely Preface TCR ===
The Preface TCR trim was first revealed in MIIT regulatory filings in August 2026. The vehicle features several changes to the exterior, including a unique front bumper with black accents, black fender vents, black wing mirror caps, side skirts, and decklid-mounted rear wing, and TCR badging. Additionally, it comes with unique 19-inch wheels with 255/35R19 and 245/35R19 tires front and rear, respectively, and red-painted brake calipers. It is 41 mm (1.6 in) wider and has been lowered by 9 mm (0.35 in). It weighs 1,550 kg (3,417 lb).

The engine has been upgraded to the BHE20-PFZ 2.0-litre (1,999 cc) turbocharged inline-4, which outputs 286 hp (213 kW; 290 PS) (275 hp (205 kW; 279 PS) net power) compared to the standard 2.0-litre (1,969 cc) engine's 268 hp (200 kW; 272 PS) (262 hp (195 kW; 266 PS) net power).

=== Geely Xingrui L and Xingrui L Zhiqing ===
The Geely Xingrui L and Geely Preface L is the facelift HEV version of the regular Xingrui or Preface. The variant was launched in October 2023, and as the HEV version, the powertrain consists of an electric motor and the BHE15-BFZ 1.5-liter turbo four-cylinder engine shared with the Geely Galaxy L7 SUV, with a maximum power output of 120 kW (161 hp; 163 PS) and a peak torque of 255 N⋅m (188 lb⋅ft). The Xingrui L Zhiqing is another hybrid variant based on the Xingrui L and was launched in December 2023. The Zhiqing (智擎) powertrain is a 1.5-liter turbo engine that generates 161 hp (120 kW; 163 PS) and 255 N⋅m (188 lb⋅ft) of torque, combined with an electric motor with 134 hp (100 kW; 136 PS) and 320 N⋅m (236 lb⋅ft) of torque with an average consumption of 23.7 km/L (4 L/100 km; 56 mpg_{‑US}). Acceleration time from 0 to 100 km/h (62 mph) is 7.5 seconds and the maximum speed is 200 km/h (124 mph). The transmission is a 3-speed DHT.

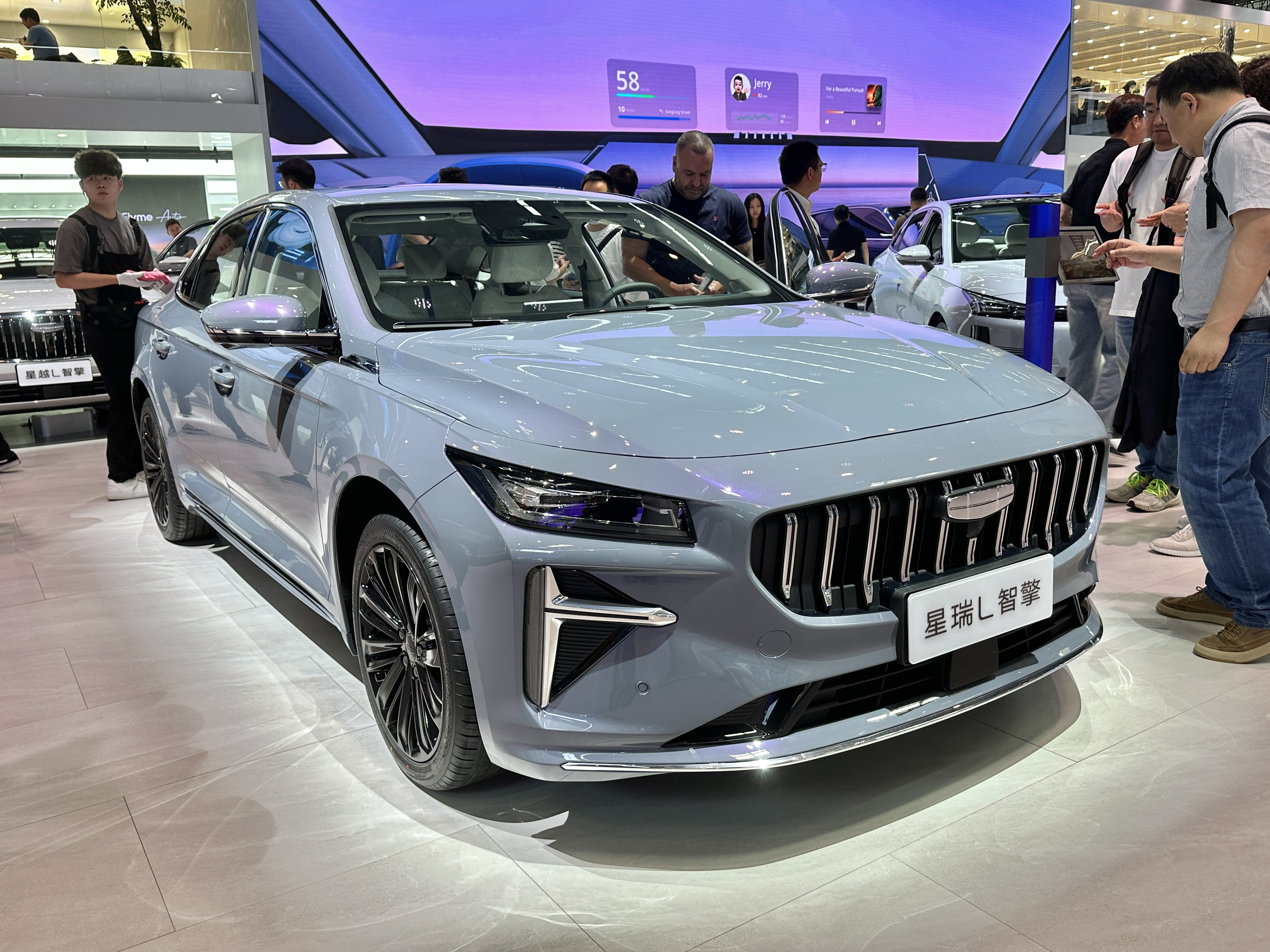
Geely Xingrui L Zhiqing

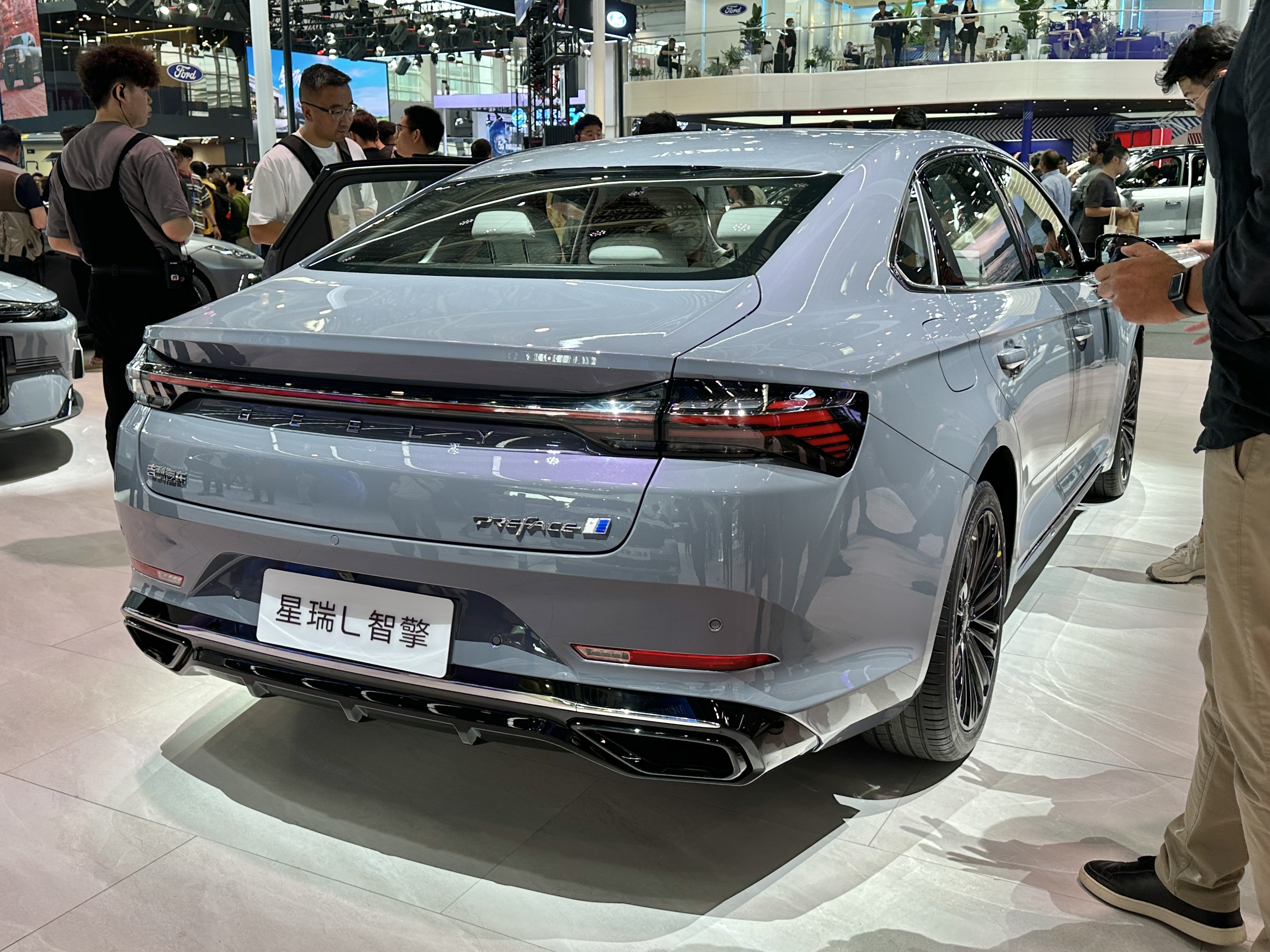
Rear view

== Second generation (FS21, 2026) ==
Second generation

Overview
- Model code: FS21
- Production: 2026–present

Body and chassis
- Platform: Compact Modular Architecture
- Related: Geely Galaxy Starshine 7; Geely Galaxy A7

Dimensions
- Wheelbase: 2,845 mm (112.0 in)
- Length: 4,956 mm (195.1 in)
- Width: 1,915 mm (75.4 in)
- Height: 1,505 mm (59.3 in)

In July 10 2026, the second generation of Xingrui is revealed, marketed as the Geely Xingrui L Plus and Geely Preface L Plus, the ICE/HEV variant of Geely Galaxy Starshine 7.

Rear view

== Motorsport ==
The Geely entered the Preface in TCR World Tour with Cyan Racing in 2026. The car earned third place in its debut race, and achieved a win in its second.

== Sales ==
Year	China
2020	19,094
2021	133,596
2022	110,747
2023	121,924
2024	162,052
2025	142,606
