= Geely Starray =

Geely Starray can refer to 2 vehicles by Geely Auto:

- Geely Starray, renamed Geely Boyue L for export markets
- Geely Starray EM-i, renamed Geely Galaxy Starship 7 EM-i for export markets
