= Geely EX2 =

Battery electric subcompact hatchback

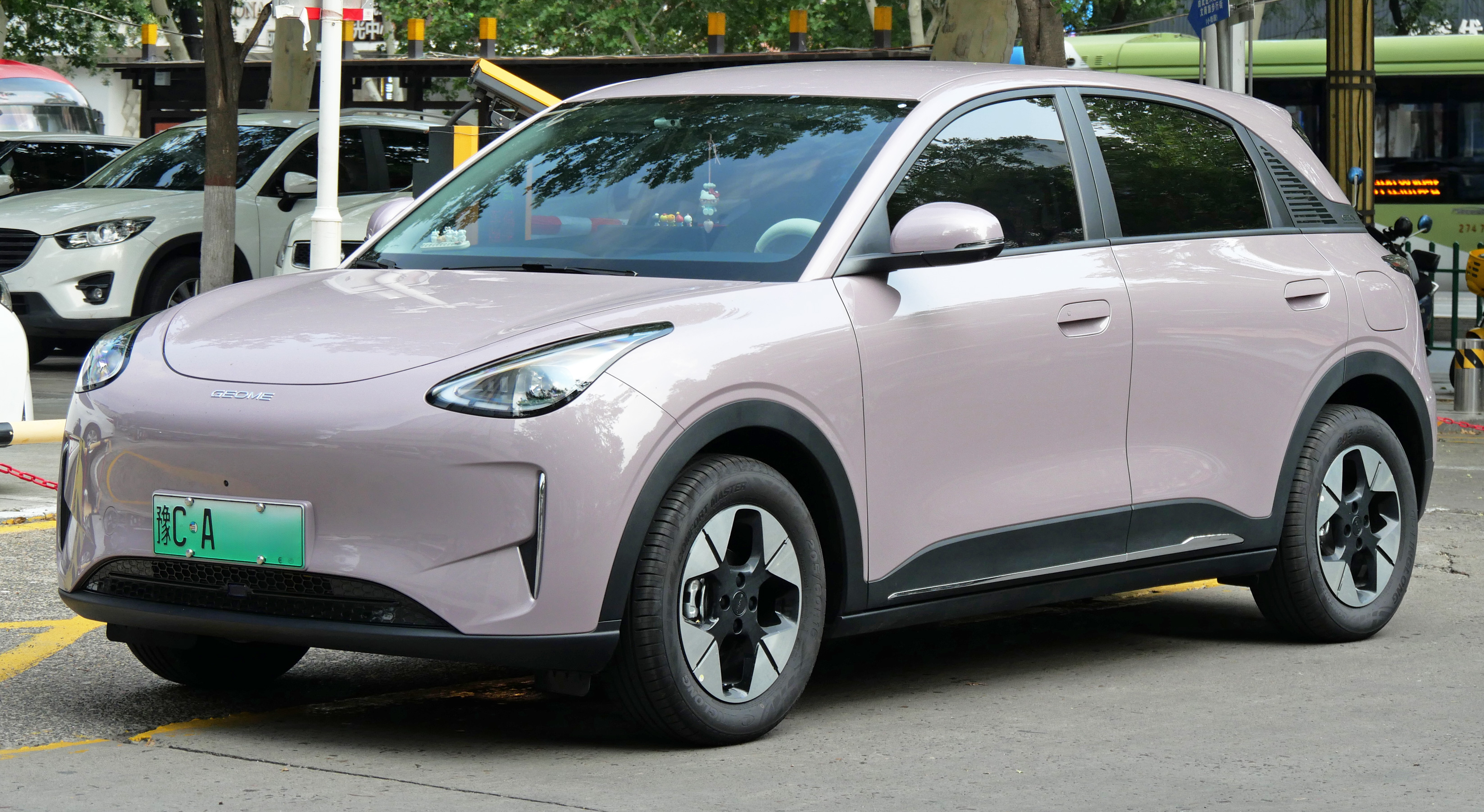

Overview
- Manufacturer: Geely Auto
- Model code: E22H
- Also called: Geely E2 (South Africa and Europe); Geely Xingyuan (China); Proton eMas 5 (Malaysia and Singapore)
- Production: September 2024 – present
- Assembly: China: Xiangtan, Hunan; Indonesia: Purwakarta, West Java (HIM); Malaysia: Proton City, Tanjong Malim, Perak (PTMSB); Brazil: Curitiba, Paraná (Renault Geely do Brasil); Belarus: Zhodzina (BelGee); Spain (from 2028): Almussafes (Ford Valencia Body and Assembly)

Body and chassis
- Class: Subcompact car (B)
- Body style: 5-door hatchback
- Layout: Rear-motor, rear-wheel-drive
- Platform: Global Intelligent New Energy Architecture (GEA)
- Related: Volvo EX30; Lynk & Co Z20; Zeekr X; smart #1; Polestar 7

Powertrain
- Electric motor: Permanent magnet synchronous
- Power output: 58–85 kW (78–114 hp; 79–116 PS)
- Battery: 30.12 kWh CATL LFP (China, Malaysia); 35 kWh CATL LFP (Europe); 39.4 kWh CATL LFP (South Africa, Thailand, Vietnam, LATAM, UK); 40.16 kWh CATL LFP (China, Malaysia); 40.8 kWh Gotion LFP (Indonesia); 47.14 kWh CATL LFP (China, Europe)
- Range: 310–480 km (193–298 mi) (CLTC); 395 km (245 mi) (NEDC)

Dimensions
- Wheelbase: 2,650 mm (104.3 in)
- Length: 4,135 mm (162.8 in)
- Width: 1,805 mm (71.1 in)
- Height: 1,570 mm (61.8 in)
- Curb weight: 1,215–1,285 kg (2,679–2,833 lb)

The Geely EX2, or the Geely Xingyuan in China (Chinese: 吉利星愿; lit. 'wish upon a star') is a battery electric subcompact hatchback manufactured by Geely Auto. It was introduced in September 2024, occupying the A0-class or equivalent to global B-segment.

In China, the Xingyuan is badged with a "Geome" logo from the automaker's Geely Geometry brand, but it is branded as "Geely" and marketed through Geely Galaxy's Star Network dealerships. Outside China, the model is marketed as the Geely EX2, the Geely E2 (European Union, South Africa), and the Proton eMas 5 (Malaysia).

In 2025, the Xingyuan was the best-selling car of any kind in China.

== History ==
The Geely Xingyuan was unveiled in early September 2024, with sales starting in late September. The model targets young, first-time car buyers, and has been pitted against the BYD Seagull and BYD Dolphin. In China, Geely collaborated with Häagen-Dazs in 2024 to promote the model. Geely will provide Häagen-Dazs ice cream to people who will test drive the Xingyuan.

In China, starting from January 2025, the EX2 (called "Xingyuan" in China) outsold every other passenger car for 18 consecutive months to become the bestselling car of 2025, also overtaking the Tesla Model Y to become the bestselling battery electric vehicle in China.

In summer 2026, Geely took over part of Ford’s Spanish Almussafes car plant in a joint venture to build the Geely EX2 in Valencia, with the first cars expected to be produced in 2028. By producing the car within the European Union, Geely will be able to sidestep the tariffs set by the European Union to counter cheap imports of Chinese electric vehicles.

=== 2026 update ===
The EX2 was updated on 28 May 2026 in China with a new larger battery option, new tech options, and several other minor changes.

A new 47.14 kWh LFP battery option was introduced, with a CLTC range of 480 km (298 mi) and is capable of recharging from 30–80% in 19 minutes.

The exterior receives minimal changes; all models now come equipped with LED headlights with optional LED daytime running lights, and models equipped with the new largest battery option gain active grille shutters and optional rain-sensing wipers. The top configuration is now equipped with the Geely Qianli Haohan H3 ADAS system capable of semiautonomous highway driving, which uses a sensor suite consisting of 3 mmWave radars along with 11 cameras, and thus feature semi-autonomous driving indicator lights on the side mirrors.

All variants other than the base variant now use the 14.6-inch central infotainment screen rather than the 10.1-inch display, and the digital systems of the highest variants are powered by SiEngine Technology's Longying No.1 7nm-class system on a chip (SoC). Heated seats are available on lower variants, and the top variant receives a ventilated function, heated steering wheel, a column shifter, automatic climate control, and ambient lighting. The suspension has been retuned for better ride quality.

== Specifications ==
The model is also equipped with a 14.6-inch infotainment screen with the Android-based Flyme Auto car operating system. In addition, the Xingyuan is also equipped with 6 airbags, and a L2 intelligent assisted driving system.

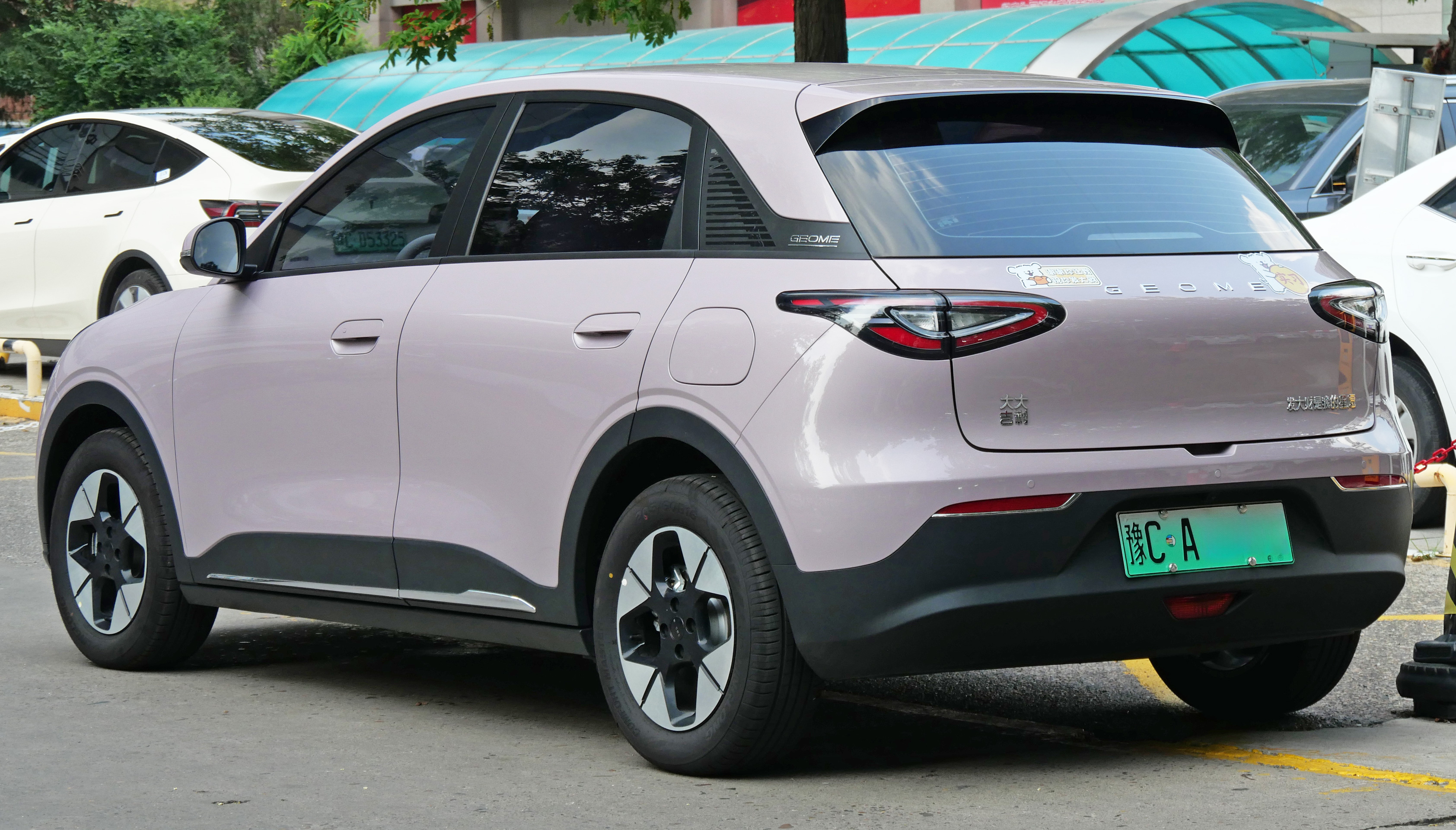
Rear view

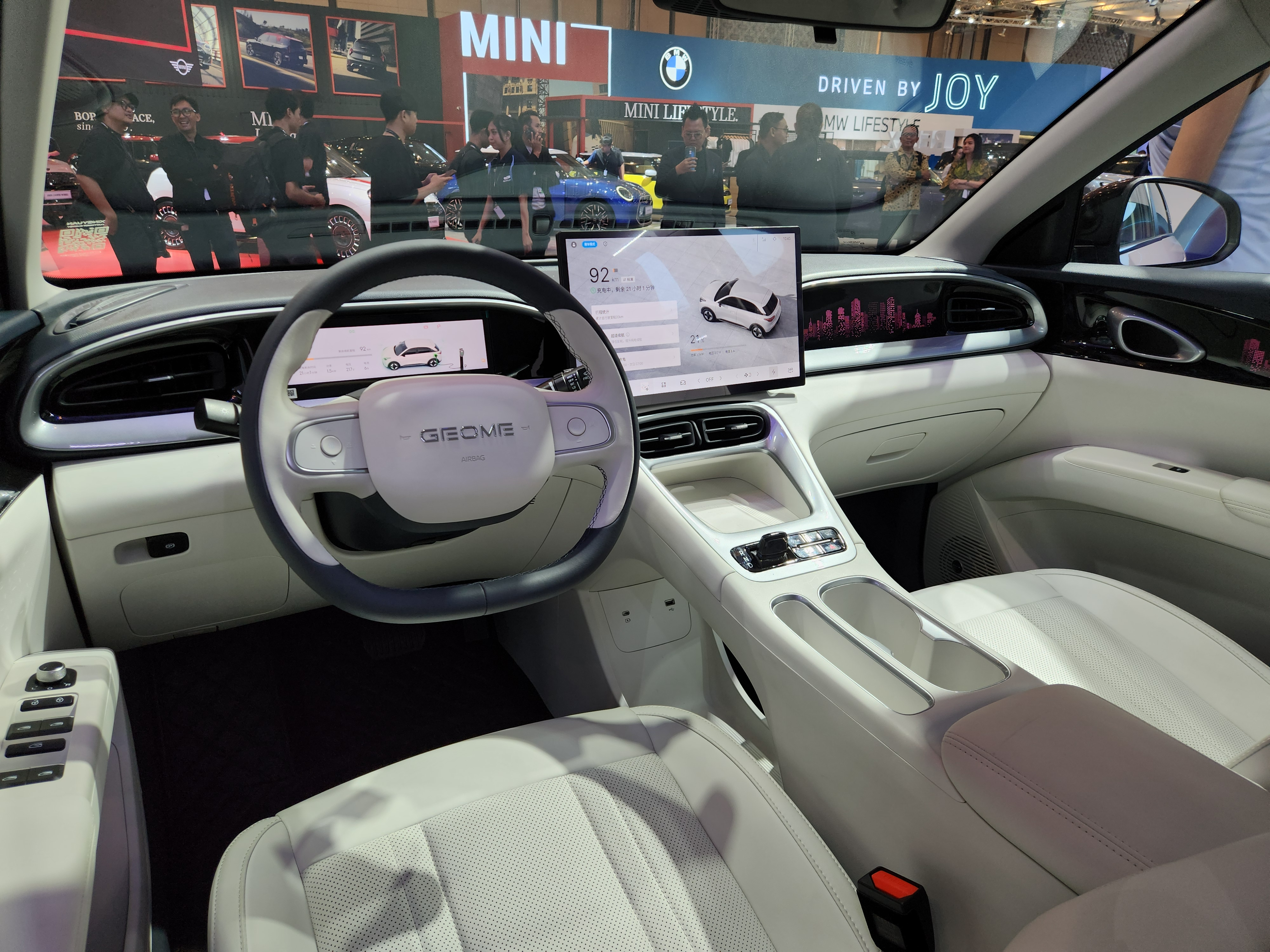
Interior

The Xingyuan has an 11-in-1 electric drive system, which unifies 11 major devices such as motors, electronic controls and reducers. The entry-level trim of the Xingyuan has a 58 kW (78 hp; 79 PS) power output with a top speed of 125 km/h (78 mph). The more powerful variant has a 85 kW (114 hp; 116 PS) electric motor with a top speed of 135 km/h (84 mph). The electric range is 310 km (193 mi) and 410 km (255 mi) respectively, rated under CLTC standards.

Specifications
Year	Battery		Power	Torque	Range			Charging		0–100 km/h (62 mph)	Top speed	Kerb weight
Year	Type	Weight	Power	Torque	WLTP	NEDC	CLTC	Peak	30–80%	0–100 km/h (62 mph)	Top speed	Kerb weight
China
2024–26	30.12 kWh LFP CATL	227 kg (500 lb)	78 hp (58 kW; 79 PS)	130 N⋅m (96 lb⋅ft)	225 km (140 mi)		310 km (193 mi)	50 kW	21 mins	14.0 sec	125 km/h (78 mph)	1,215 kg (2,679 lb)
2026–	30.12 kWh LFP CATL	227 kg (500 lb)	78 hp (58 kW; 79 PS)	130 N⋅m (96 lb⋅ft)			310 km (193 mi)	50 kW	21 mins	14.0 sec	130 km/h (81 mph)	1,215 kg (2,679 lb)
2024–26	40.16 kWh LFP CATL	292 kg (644 lb)	114 hp (85 kW; 116 PS)	150 N⋅m (111 lb⋅ft)	325 km (202 mi)		410 km (255 mi)	67 kW	21 mins	9.5 sec	135 km/h (84 mph)	1,285 kg (2,833 lb)
2026–	40.16 kWh LFP CATL	292 kg (644 lb)	114 hp (85 kW; 116 PS)	150 N⋅m (111 lb⋅ft)			410 km (255 mi)		21 mins	9.5 sec	140 km/h (87 mph)	1,285 kg (2,833 lb)
2026–	47.14 kWh LFP CATL	302 kg (666 lb)	114 hp (85 kW; 116 PS)	150 N⋅m (111 lb⋅ft)			480 km (298 mi)		19 mins	9.5 sec	140 km/h (87 mph)	1,330 kg (2,932 lb)
Export markets
2025–	35 kWh LFP CATL		114 hp (85 kW; 116 PS)	150 N⋅m (111 lb⋅ft)	252 km (157 mi)			70 kW	21 mins	10.2 sec	140 km/h (87 mph)	1,300 kg (2,866 lb)
2025–	39.4 kWh LFP CATL		114 hp (85 kW; 116 PS)	150 N⋅m (111 lb⋅ft)	325 km (202 mi)	395 km (245 mi)	410 km (255 mi)	70 kW	21 mins	10.2 sec	140 km/h (87 mph)	1,300 kg (2,866 lb)
2025–	40.8kWh LFP Gotion		114 hp (85 kW; 116 PS)	150 N⋅m (111 lb⋅ft)		395 km (245 mi)		70 kW	25 mins	11.5 sec	130 km/h (81 mph)	
2025–	47 kWh LFP CATL		114 hp (85 kW; 116 PS)	150 N⋅m (111 lb⋅ft)	345 km (214 mi)			70 kW	21 mins	10.2 sec	140 km/h (87 mph)	1,300 kg (2,866 lb)

== Safety ==
ANCAP test results Geely EX2 (2026, aligned with Euro NCAP)
Test	Score
Overall:	5 /5 stars
Safe driving	79%
Crash avoidance	72%
Crash protection	86%
Post crash	95%

Euro NCAP test results Geely EX2 (2026)
Test	Score
Overall:	5 /5 stars
Safe driving	79%
Crash avoidance	72%
Crash protection	86%
Post crash	95%

== Export markets ==
=== Africa ===
==== South Africa ====
The EX2 was launched in South Africa on 14 April 2026 as the Geely E2, with two variants: Aspire and Apex, both variants use the 39.4 kWh battery pack.

=== Asia ===
==== Indonesia ====
The EX2 was launched in Indonesia on 21 November 2025 at the 2025 Gaikindo Jakarta Auto Week and went on sale in January 2026 as a locally assembled model. It is available with two variants: Pro and Max, both variants powered by a 40.8 kWh battery pack from Gotion.

==== Philippines ====
The EX2 was launched in the Philippines on 23 June 2026 with two variants: Pro and Max, both variants powered by a 39.4 kWh battery pack. Previously, the car was first previewed at the 2026 Manila International Auto Show and the 2026 Philippine International Auto Show.

==== Thailand ====
The EX2 was launched in Thailand on 28 November 2025, as Geely's second model to be marketed in the country under their partnership with the local distributor, Thonburi Neustern. It is available with two variants: Pro and Max, both variants powered by a 39.4 kWh battery pack.

==== Vietnam ====
The EX2 was launched in Vietnam on 27 March 2026, alongside the EX5 EM-i. It is available with two variants: Pro and Max, with both variants powered by a 39.4 kWh battery pack.

=== Europe ===
In November 2025, it was confirmed that Geely would launch the EX2 in the United Kingdom in 2026.

In July 2026, Geely took over part of Ford’s Spanish Almussafes car plant in a joint venture with Ford to build the Geely EX2 in Valencia, with the first cars for sale in the European Union expected to be produced in 2028.

The model was released in Europe as the Geely E2 in August 2026, except in the United Kingdom where it is marketed as the EX2. In Europe, it is available with three trim levels: Pro, Max and Ultra. The Pro trim uses the 35 kWh battery pack while the Max and Ultra trims use the larger 47 kWh battery pack.

=== Latin America ===
==== Brazil ====
The EX2 was launched in Brazil on 6 November 2025, with two variants: Pro and Max, both variants powered by a 39.4 kWh battery pack.

==== Costa Rica ====
The EX2 was launched in Costa Rica on 1 July 2025, with two variants: GLS+ and GT+, both variants powered by a 39.4 kWh battery pack. It is branded in marketing materials as "Geely Geome," though they have been badged as either "Geome" or "EX2" on the vehicle itself. It is sold through Geely's partnership with Veinsa Motors.

==== Mexico ====
The EX2 was launched in Mexico on 5 February 2026, with two variants: GL and GF, both variants powered by a 39.4 kWh battery pack.

=== Oceania ===
==== Australia ====
The EX2 was launched in Australia on 14 July 2026, with two variants: Complete (35.3 kWh) and Inspire (47.1 kWh). At the time of its introduction, the EX2 was the cheapest battery electric rear-wheel drive vehicle.

==== New Zealand ====
The EX2 was launched in New Zealand on 18 August 2026, with two variants: Complete (35.3 kWh) and Inspire (47.1 kWh).

== Proton eMas 5 ==
In Malaysia, the Xingyuan is sold by the local automaker Proton as the Proton eMas 5. It was first unveiled as a camouflaged prototype vehicle on 8 May 2025 at the Malaysia Autoshow 2025. The production model was unveiled on 28 October 2025 at the 47th ASEAN Summit, with the prime minister Anwar Ibrahim at the unveiling event. The eMas 5 is Proton's second battery electric vehicle and the second rear-wheel drive vehicle produced by Proton. It was launched on 30 October 2025, with two variants with differing battery options: Prime with the Standard Range (30.12 kWh) battery, and Premium with the Long Range (40.16 kWh) battery.

Compared to the Geely model, the Proton model is differentiated with the use of its own Proton logo on the front fascia, Proton script and eMas 5 badge on the rear fascia, and the use of a "shooting star" pattern on the illuminated interior decorative trim piece (replacing the Xingyuan’s skyscraper motif).

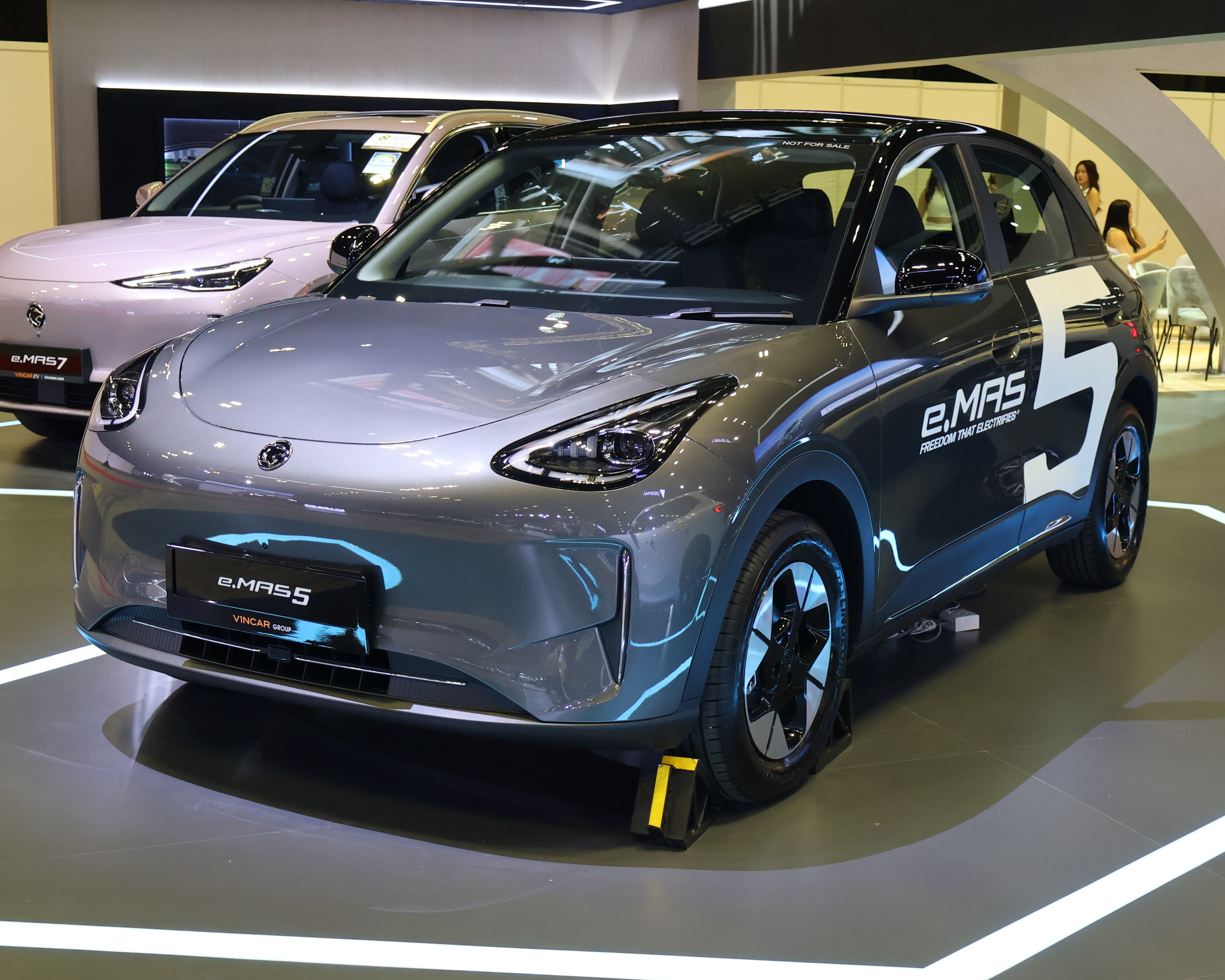
Proton eMas 5

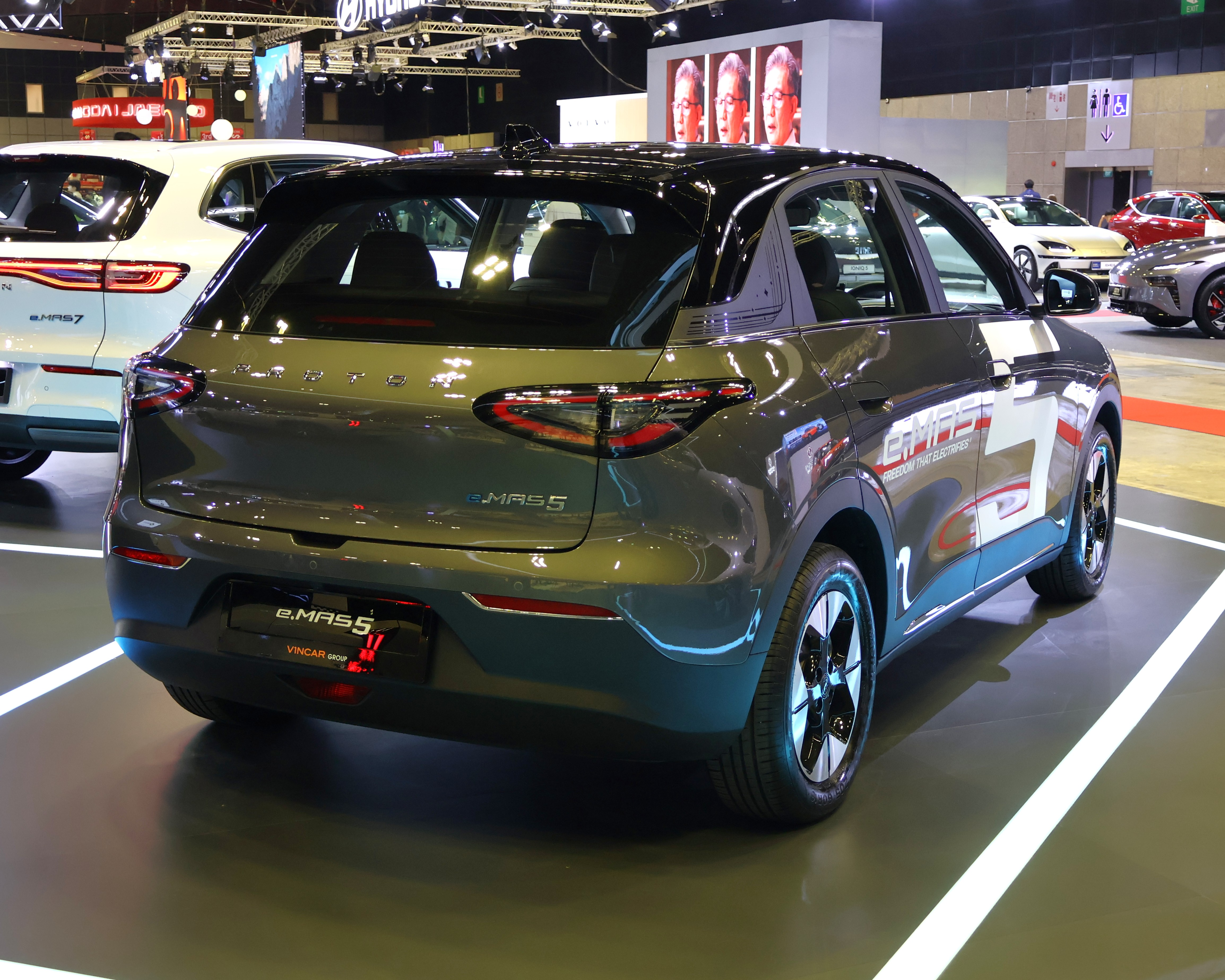
Rear view

=== Export markets ===
==== Nepal ====
The eMas5 was launched in Nepal on 3 August 2026, with two variants: Prime (30.12 kWh) and Premium (40.16 kWh). The Nepalese variant line-up mirrors to that of the Malaysian models.

==== Singapore ====
The eMas 5 was launched in Singapore on 4 July 2026, in the sole variant using the 40.16 kWh battery pack.

== Sales ==
On 20 October 2026, Geely Galaxy announced that the 1 millionth Xingyuan rolled off the production line since production started in October 2024, with an average of one sold every minute. Production reached the 200,000 mark in May 2025, 600,000 in March 2026, and 800,000 in August 2026.

Year	China	Brazil	Mexico
2024	52,659		
2025	457,756	2,442	79

== See also ==
- List of Geely vehicles
