= Geely EX5 =

Battery electric compact SUV

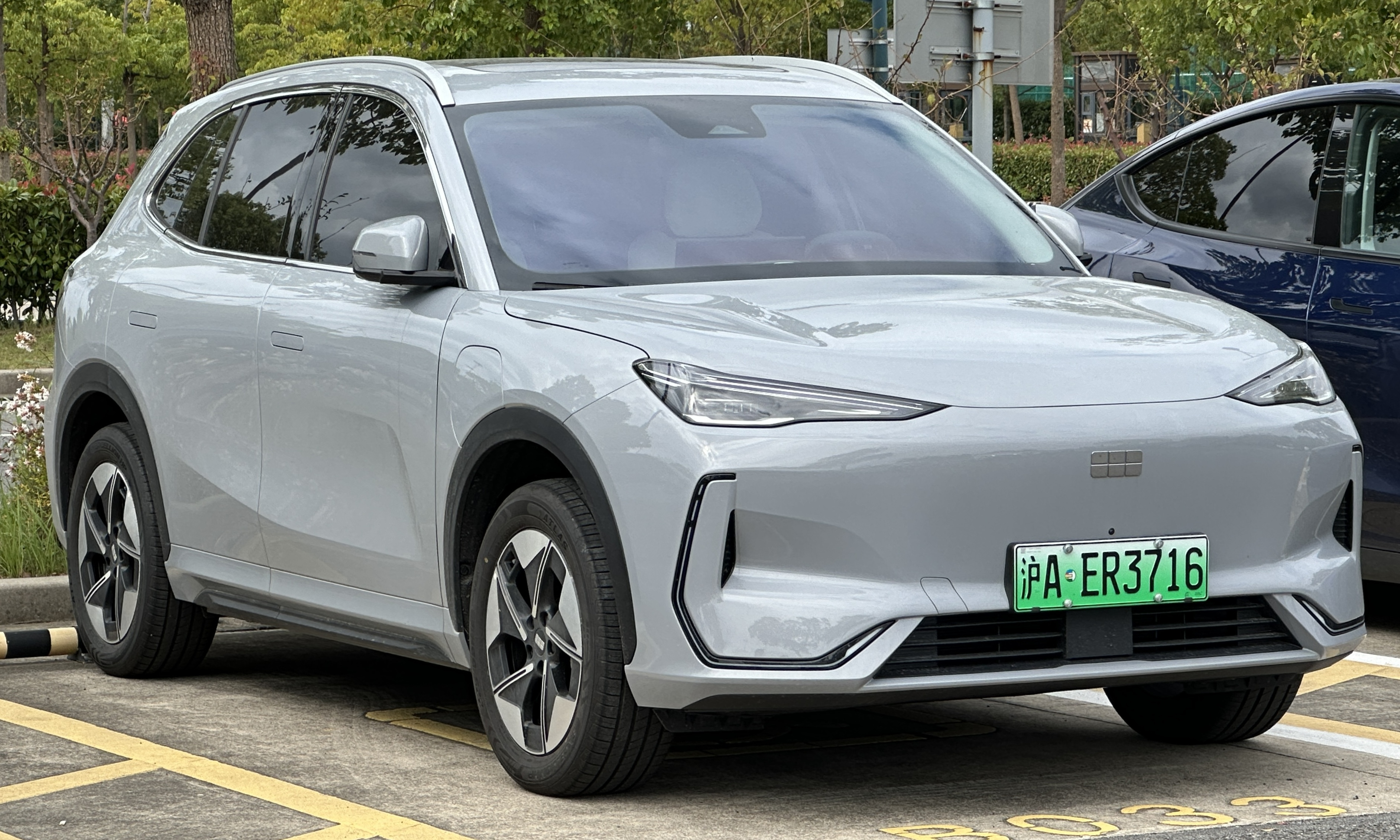

Overview
- Manufacturer: Geely Auto
- Model code: E245
- Also called: Geely E5 (South Africa and Europe); Geely Galaxy E5 (China); Geely Galaxy EX5 (Kazakhstan); Proton eMas 7 (Malaysia, Singapore and Nepal)
- Production: July 2024 – present
- Assembly: China: Guiyang, Guizhou; Belarus: Barysaw (BelGee); Indonesia: Purwakarta, West Java (HIM); Malaysia: Proton City, Tanjong Malim, Perak (PTMSB)

Body and chassis
- Class: Compact SUV (C-segment)
- Body style: 5-door crossover SUV
- Layout: Front-motor, front-wheel-drive; Rear-motor, rear-wheel-drive (2027 model)
- Platform: Global Intelligent New Energy Architecture (GEA)
- Related: Geely Galaxy Starship 7 / EX5 EM-i / Starray EM-i

Powertrain
- Electric motor: Permanent magnet synchronous
- Power output: 160 kW (215 hp; 218 PS); 245 kW (329 hp; 333 PS) (2027 model)
- Battery: 49.52 kWh Aegis Short Blade LFP; 60.22 kWh Aegis Short Blade LFP; 68.39 kWh Aegis Short Blade LFP; 70 kWh Aegis Short Blade LFP (2027 model)
- Plug-in charging: 7 kW single-phase (AC); 11 kW three-phase (AC, export); 110 kW (DC)

Dimensions
- Wheelbase: 2,750 mm (108.3 in)
- Length: 4,615 mm (181.7 in)
- Width: 1,901 mm (74.8 in)
- Height: 1,670 mm (65.7 in)
- Kerb weight: 1,615–1,740 kg (3,560–3,836 lb)

The Geely EX5, or the Geely Galaxy E5 (Chinese: 吉利银河E5; pinyin: Jílì Yínhé E5) in China, is a battery electric compact SUV produced and manufactured by the Chinese automaker Geely Auto since 2024 and co-developed with Malaysian automaker Proton.

Debuting in May 2024, it is the second battery electric vehicle within the company's Galaxy product line after the Geely Galaxy E8 sedan. It is the first vehicle to be built on Geely's Global Intelligent New Energy Architecture (GEA) platform, a derivative of the company's self-developed Sustainable Experience Architecture (SEA). A plug-in hybrid version of the car, the Geely Galaxy Starship 7, was made available since October 2024, featuring a revised styling while retaining some body panels from the former.

Proton, which has been a subsidiary of Geely since 2017, also marketed and sold the vehicle as the Proton eMas 7 (stylised as e.MAS 7) in Malaysia and select markets since December 2024, as the brand's first battery electric vehicle.

== Overview ==
The vehicle was first revealed with a set of images on 7 May 2024, before debuting in China the following week of that month. It went on production in July 2024. Chinese sales were commenced on 3 August 2024. According to Geely, the Galaxy E5 was the first model to be developed in left-hand drive and right hand-drive simultaneously, indicating a greater focus on export markets. The vehicle was developed to compete with the BYD Yuan Plus/Atto 3, by closely approximating its specifications while offering a larger footprint to attract consumers.

On 2 August 2024, the Galaxy E5 is announced to be sold in Malaysia under the Proton brand as the eMas 7. According to Proton, both the eMas 7 and EX5 were developed concurrently, with a total of 230 engineers and designers from Proton involved in the development of both vehicles. Proton's CEO, Li Chunrong, stated that the joint development allows for a shorter time to create right-hand drive versions of both vehicles, thereby improving efficiency and sharing costs.

On 4 September 2024, Geely revealed its export name, the EX5, in a video posted on their YouTube channel, which it made its global debut the following week later in Germany at the 2024 Automechanika Frankfurt, with the company announced their plans to sell the vehicle in several markets such as Norway, Australia, Thailand and Indonesia.

The vehicle's software adopts the Flyme Auto operating system and Flyme Sound audio system, developed in conjunction with the company-owned Meizu. The system is powered by the Dragon Eagle-1 system on a chip (SoC), an automotive SoC produced with a 7 nm process.

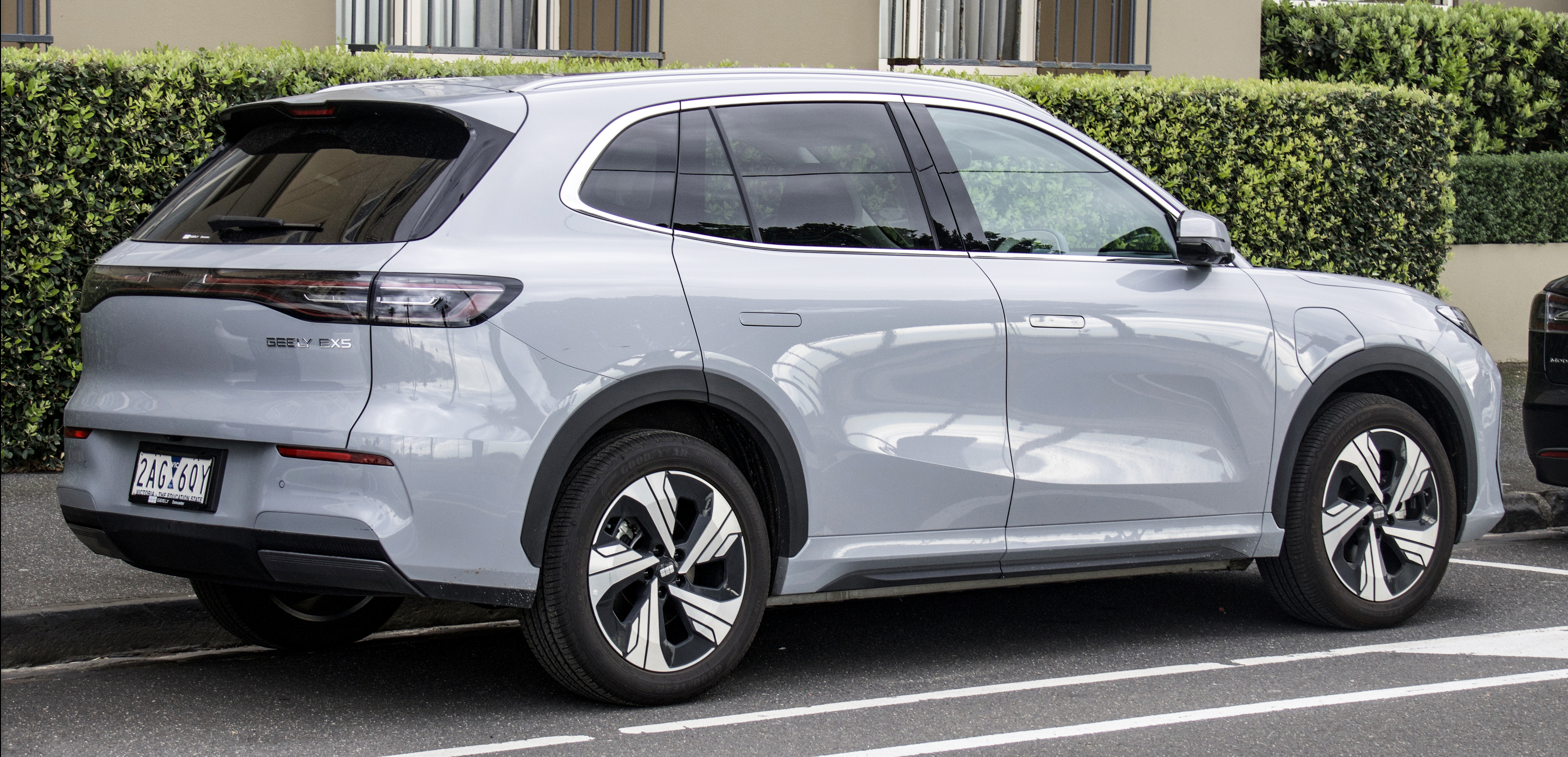
Rear view

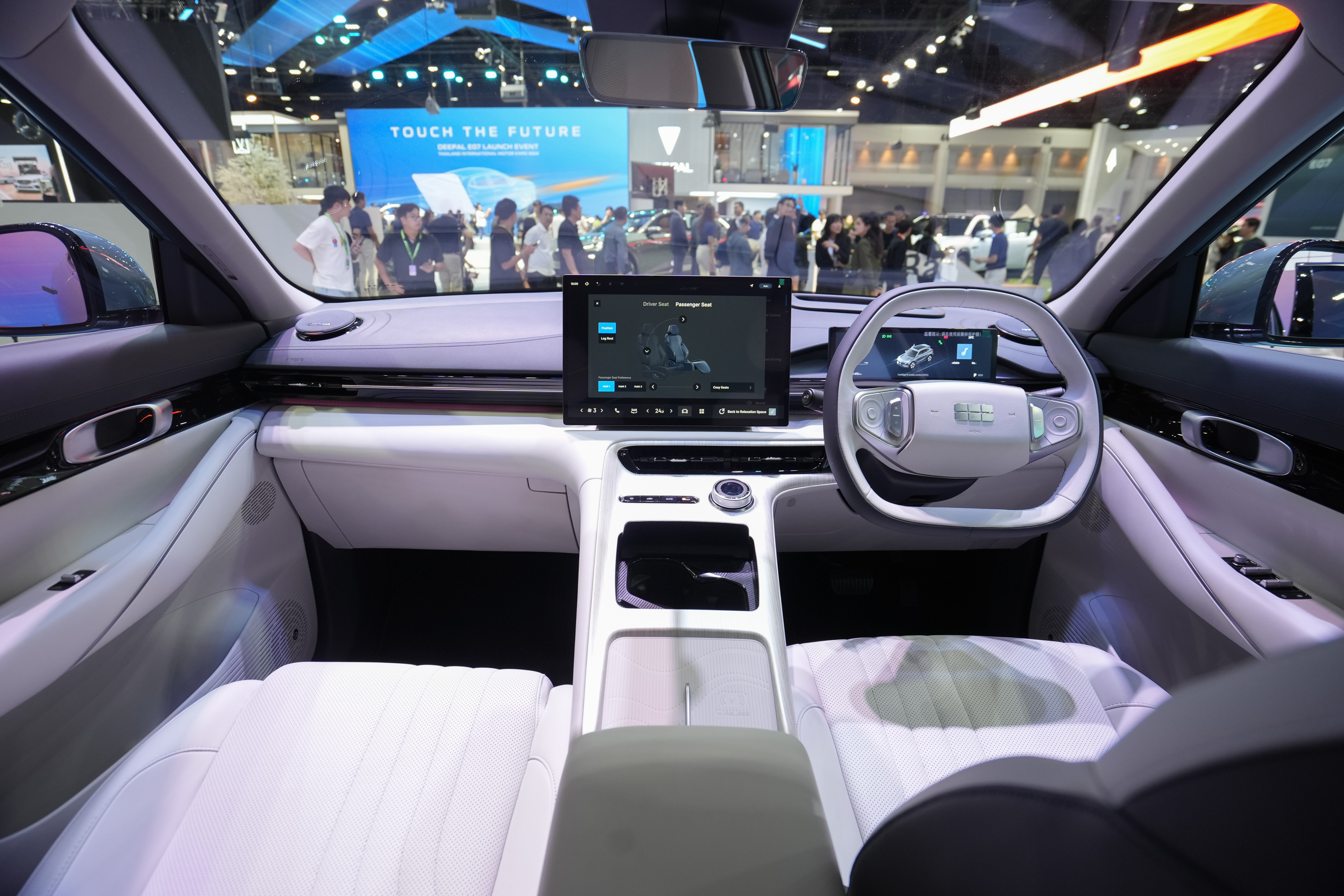
Interior

=== 2027 facelift ===
On 11 June 2026, an updated version of the EX5 was shown in China's MIIT filings; it was subsequently officially revealed on 21 September 2026 as the 2027 model year. Exterior changes include a reshaped front bumper with chrome elements and new alloy wheel options, while traditional door handles replace the previously flush units. The "Geely" wordmark on the tailgate was moved from the lower right (with the EX5 or E5 badge) to the center below the taillights. The charging port was also repositioned from the front fender to the rear. Geely says the E5 has a tortional rigidity of 36,000N·m/°, and claims it is the first in the price range to pass the Euro NCAP 50 km/h (31 mph) front pole collision test. Furthermore, the interior was updated with a new steering wheel and improved materials. The new variants are rear-wheel drive with a more powerful motor, which allows room for the addition of a 160-litre (5.7 cu ft) frunk and 1,838 litres (64.9 cu ft) of rear cargo space with the seats folded down. The rear suspension is upgraded from four-link to a five-link geometry. Higher variants are available with variable dampers and a 2000-watt 23-speaker Flyme Sound sound system with 4 overhead channels. The vehicle uses Geely's EEA4.0 electronic and electrical architecture. It is now available with a G-ASD H5 Level 2 ADAS system, which has a sensor suite consisting of one LiDAR, 3 mmWave radars, 11 cameras, and 12 ultrasonic sensors and is powered by a Horizon Robotics Journey 6M chip.

2027 facelift

== Powertrain ==
The EX5 is offered with a single-motor, front-wheel drive setup, paired with Geely's self-developed lithium iron phosphate (LFP) battery called the Aegis Short Blade. It is rated at 160 kW (215 hp; 218 PS), with a claimed top speed of 175 km/h (109 mph) and 0–100 km/h (0–62 mph) acceleration time of 6.9 seconds. Battery capacity options are 49.52 kWh and 60.22 kWh, with rated CLTC range of 440 km (273 mi) and 530 km (329 mi) respectively. The vehicle is integrated with a 11-in-1 intelligent electric drive system, which unifies 11 major devices such as motors, electronic controls and reducers. Its battery is integrated to the body with cell-to-body (CTB) integration. Drag coefficient is claimed to be the lowest its segment at Cd 0.269, helping its power efficiency which is claimed at 11.9 kWh per 100 km.

The facelifted 2027 model is equipped with a rear-motor, rear-wheel-drive layout with a more powerful 245 kW (329 hp; 333 PS) motor in a Leishen 16-in-1 drive system with a 23-in-1 thermal management system. Top speed increases to 201 km/h (125 mph). It has the choice of two new battery packs with 800-volt power electronics using Geely's second generation Aegis Ultra (also known as Shendun Golden battery) short blade battery cells, which are capable of recharging from 10–70% in 8 minutes and 25 seconds. The older 60.22 kWh powertrain is retained as an entry model as the Global Classic variant in China.

| Type | Battery | | Layout | Electric motor | Power | Torque | 0–100 km/h (62 mph) | Range | | | Charging | | Calendar years (China) |
| Type | Type | Weight | Layout | Electric motor | Power | Torque | 0–100 km/h (62 mph) | CLTC | NEDC | WLTP | Peak | Time | Calendar years (China) |
|---|---|---|---|---|---|---|---|---|---|---|---|---|---|
| Standard Range 440 km | 49.52 kWh LFP Aegis Short Blade battery | 386 kg (851 lb) | FWD | TZ184XY101PMSM | 160 kW (215 hp; 218 PS) | 320 N⋅m (32.6 kg⋅m; 236 lb⋅ft) | 6.9 seconds | 440 km (273 mi) | N/A | 345 km (214 mi) | | 30–80%: 20 min | 2024–25 |
| Long Range 530 km | 60.22 kWh LFP Aegis Short Blade battery | 443 kg (977 lb) | FWD | TZ184XY101PMSM | 160 kW (215 hp; 218 PS) | 320 N⋅m (32.6 kg⋅m; 236 lb⋅ft) | 6.9 seconds | 530 km (329 mi) | 495 km (308 mi) | 425 km (264 mi) | 120 kW | 30–80%: 20 min | 2024–present |
| Long Range 610 km | 68.39 kWh LFP Aegis Short Blade battery | 483 kg (1,065 lb) | FWD | TZ184XY101PMSM | 160 kW (215 hp; 218 PS) | 320 N⋅m (32.6 kg⋅m; 236 lb⋅ft) | 6.9 seconds | 610 km (379 mi) | 550 km (342 mi) | N/A | | 30–80%: 20 min | 2025–26 |
| | 61.52 kWh LFP 2nd gen Aegis Ultra Short Blade battery | 443 kg (977 lb) | RWD | TZ184QY301 PMSM | 245 kW (329 hp; 333 PS) | 320 N⋅m (32.6 kg⋅m; 236 lb⋅ft) | 6.2 seconds | 550 km (342 mi) | | | 460 kW | 10–70%: 8.5 min | 2026–present |
| | 70.01 kWh LFP 2nd gen Aegis Ultra Short Blade battery | 497 kg (1,096 lb) | RWD | TZ184QY301 PMSM | 245 kW (329 hp; 333 PS) | 320 N⋅m (32.6 kg⋅m; 236 lb⋅ft) | 5.8 seconds | 635 km (395 mi) | | | 460 kW | 10–70%: 8.5 min | 2026–present |

== Export markets ==
=== Africa ===
==== South Africa ====
The EX5 was launched in South Africa on 20 November 2025 as the Geely E5, alongside the plug-in hybrid Geely E5 EM-i, as one of Geely's first models to be marketed in the country. It is available in two variants: Aspire and Apex. In May 2026, the flagship Apex Plus variant using the larger 68.39 kWh battery pack was added to the lineup.

=== Australasia ===
The EX5 for the Australian and New Zealand markets was revealed in February 2025, with sales commencing in March 2025. Available in Complete and Inspire grades, the vehicle received a revised suspension tuning and a localized ADAS calibration to better suit with the region's road conditions. Head of Geely Auto Australia, Li Lei confirms that a BYD Atto 3 and a Tesla Model 3 were used as its benchmarks during its local suspension testing. It is Geely's first new model in Australia and New Zealand after an eleven-year hiatus since the brand's sole model in the region, the MK launched in 2011. In March 2026, the EX5 line-up was updated with an increased battery capacity to 68.39 kWh for both Complete and Inspire grades.

=== Europe ===
The EX5 was introduced in Europe in September 2024 in Frankfurt, Germany, and was launched in selected European markets in June 2025 as the first global Geely model to received European certification. For Europe, it is available with 49.5 kWh and 60.2 kWh battery packs.

The EX5 was announced in the UK in right-hand drive form in September 2025, with customer deliveries the following month.

=== Latin America ===
==== Argentina ====
The EX5 was launched in Argentina on 17 October 2025, as part of Geely's return to the Argentinian market by distributor Autos Sustentables del Sur. It is available in the sole unnamed variant using the 60.2 kWh battery pack.

==== Brazil ====
The EX5 was launched in Brazil on 17 July 2025, as part of Geely's return to the Brazilian market. It is available with two trim levels: Pro and Max, both variants use the 60.2 kWh battery pack.

==== Mexico ====
The EX5 went on sale in Mexico on 12 August 2025, in the sole GF variant.

=== Southeast Asia ===
==== Indonesia ====
The EX5 was Geely's first model in Indonesia after a nine-year hiatus since the brand exited the market in 2016. It was introduced on 22 January 2025, with sales commencing about a month later at the 32nd Indonesia International Motor Show. It is sold in two variants: Max and Pro. At the beginning, the first initial units were fully imported from China, with latter models will be locally assembled at Handal Indonesia Motor's facility in Purwakarta, West Java during the third quarter of 2025.

==== Thailand ====
Debuted in November 2024 at the 41st Thailand International Motor Expo, Thailand was chosen for both ASEAN and right-hand drive debut to the EX5. It is Geely's first model to be marketed in Thailand under their partnership with the local distributor, Thonburi Neustern. Imported from China, it is sold in two variants: Max and Pro. Deliveries were commenced in March 2025. In March 2026, the Max+ variant using the 68.4 kWh battery pack was added to the line-up as the flagship variant.

==== Vietnam ====
The EX5 was first introduced in Vietnam in March 2025. It was launched in Vietnam on 16 July 2025, with two variants: Pro and Max.

== Proton eMas 7 ==
In Malaysia, the EX5 is sold by the local automaker Proton as the Proton eMas 7 (stylised as e.MAS 7). It was first unveiled as a camouflaged prototype vehicle on 2 August 2024. The production version was revealed on 16 December 2024, with sales commencing at the same time. The eMas 7 is Proton's first battery electric vehicle, and the first product to be marketed under the company's eMas sub-brand, which is distributed by the Proton New Energy Technology (Pro-Net) subsidiary.

It is offered in two variants with differing battery options: Prime with the Standard Range (49.52 kWh) battery, and Premium with the Long Range (60.22 kWh) battery. To better suit with Malaysia's road conditions, the eMas 7 received a revised suspension tuning.

In the beginning, the eMas 7 was fully imported from China, with latter versions became locally assembled at Proton's Tanjung Malim facility by March 2026, where Proton built a new plant dedicated to electric vehicle production.

In June 2026, the Premium Plus variant using the larger 68.3 kWh battery pack was introduced as the flagship variant.

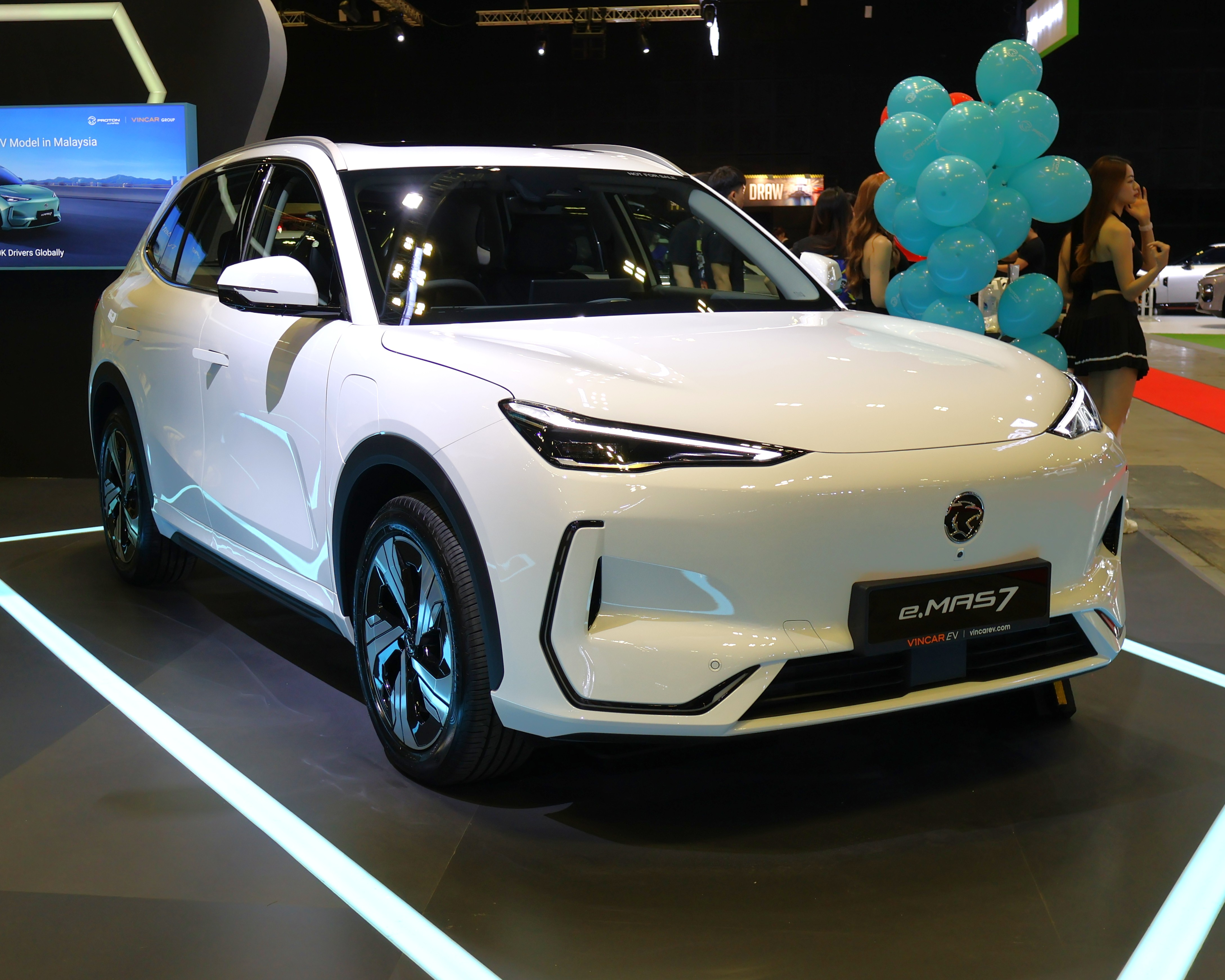
Proton eMas 7

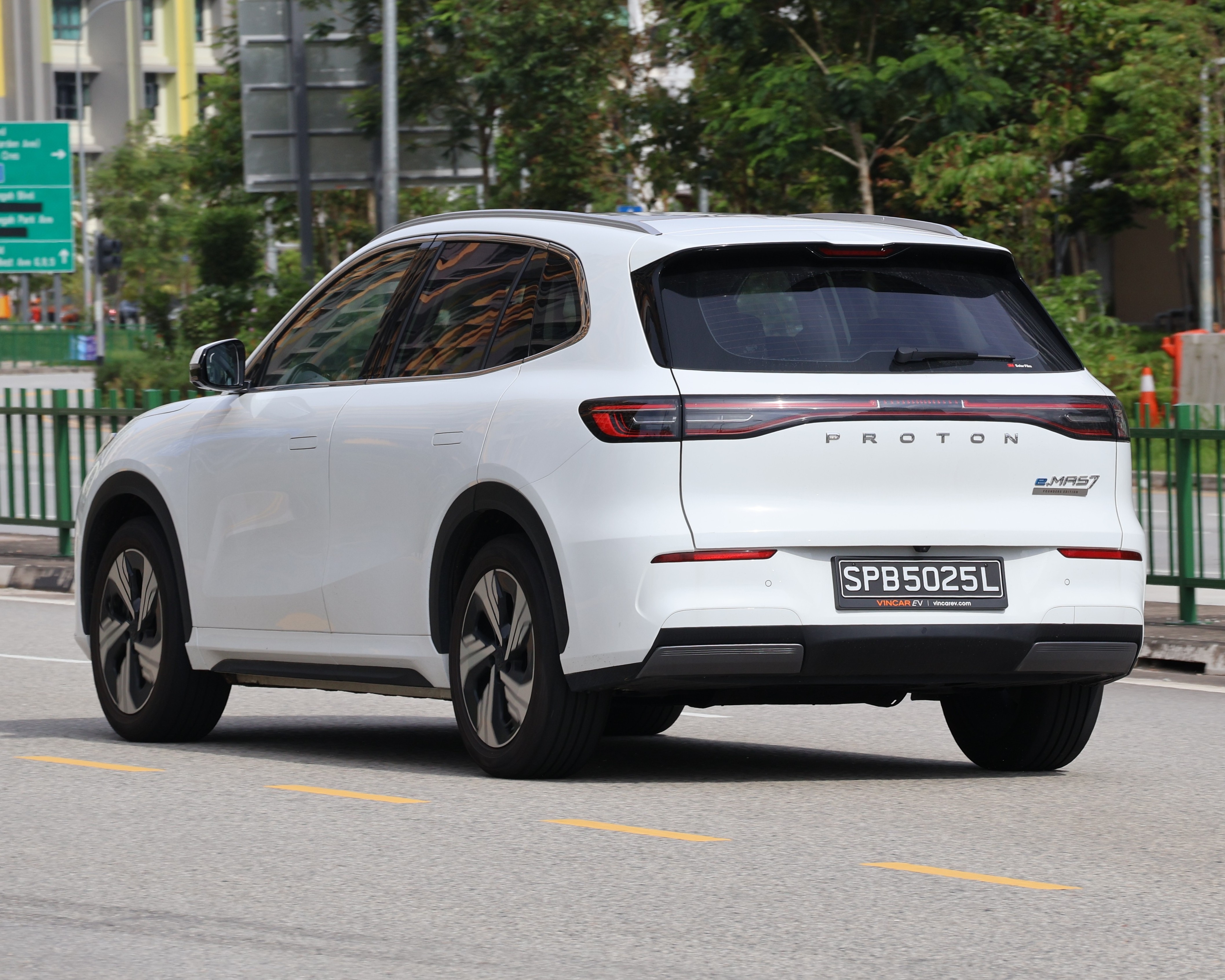
Rear view

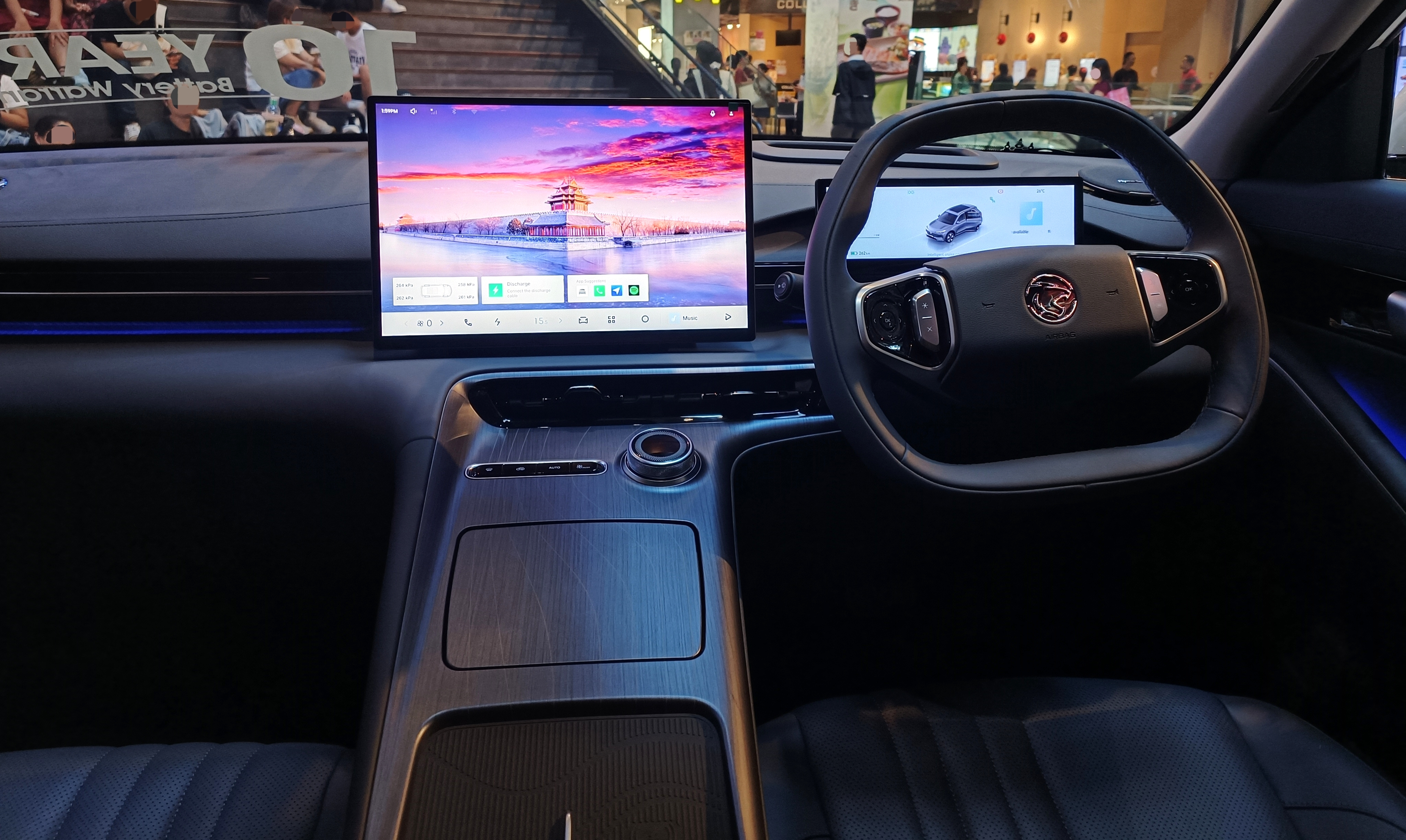
Interior

=== Export markets ===
Outside Malaysia, the eMas 7 was exported to Mauritius, Nepal, Singapore, Trinidad and Tobago. The first 50 units were shipped to Nepal in February 2025.

==== Nepal ====
Sales of the eMas 7 for the Nepalese market began on 24 March 2025, with the variant line-up mirrors to that of the Malaysian models; Prime (49.52 kWh) and Premium (60.22 kWh).

==== Singapore ====
The eMas 7 was launched in Singapore on 18 September 2025, with the variant line-up mirrors to that of the Malaysian models; Prime (49.52 kWh) and Premium (60.22 kWh). Both variants are eligible for the Category B Certificate of Entitlement (COE) bracket.

== Safety ==
=== ANCAP (Geely EX5) ===
ANCAP test results Geely EX5 (2025, aligned with Euro NCAP)
| Test | Points | % |
|---|---|---|
| Overall: | 5 /5 stars | |
| Adult occupant: | 34.53 | 86% |
| Child occupant: | 42.79 | 87% |
| Pedestrian: | 52.77 | 83% |
| Safety assist: | 15.43 | 85% |

=== ASEAN NCAP (Proton eMas 7) ===
ASEAN NCAP test results Proton e.Mas 7 (2024)
| Test | Points |
|---|---|
| Overall: | 5 /5 stars |
| Adult occupant: | 39.00 |
| Child occupant: | 17.32 |
| Safety assist: | 20.00 |
| Motorcyclist Safety: | 16.25 |

=== Euro NCAP (Geely EX5) ===
Euro NCAP test results Geely EX5 Pro (LHD) (2025)
| Test | Points | % |
|---|---|---|
| Overall: | 5 /5 stars | |
| Adult occupant: | 34.5 | 86% |
| Child occupant: | 43 | 87% |
| Pedestrian: | 52.8 | 83% |
| Safety assist: | 15.1 | 83% |

== Sales ==
On 30 January 2025, Geely announced that it has produced the 100,000th unit of the Galaxy E5 in less than six months since sales commenced in China.

| Year | China | Australia | Thailand | Malaysia (Note: Figures based on registration (Malaysia)) | Mexico | Indonesia |
| Year | China | Australia | Thailand | Proton eMas 7 | Mexico | Indonesia |
|---|---|---|---|---|---|---|
| 2024 | 76,774 | — | — | — | — | — |
| 2025 | 103,609 | 3,944 | 1,608 | 8,677 | 145 | 2,240 |

== See also ==
- List of Geely vehicles
