= Geely Galaxy Starship 7 =

Compact crossover SUV

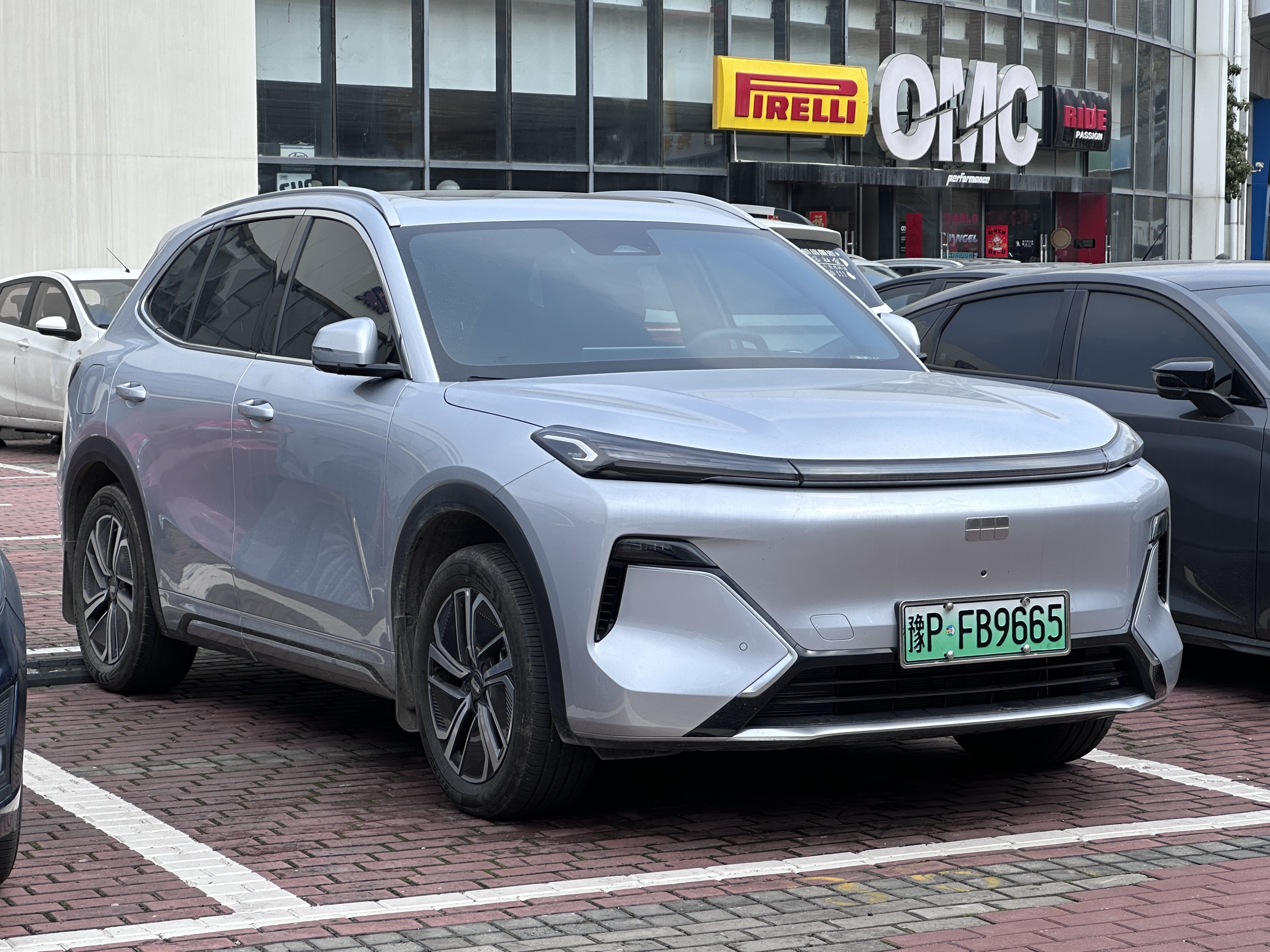

Overview
- Manufacturer: Geely Auto
- Model code: P145
- Also called: Geely EX5 EM-i; Geely EX5 EM-R (Russia); Geely E5 EM-i (South Africa); Geely Galaxy EX5 EM-i (Kazakhstan); Geely Starray EM-i (Australia, Indonesia, Israel and Spain); Geely Starray EM-R (Thailand); BelGee X80 PHEV (Belarus); Proton eMas 7 PHEV (Malaysia)
- Production: November 2024 – present
- Assembly: China: Linhai, Zhejiang; Indonesia: Purwakarta, West Java (HIM, Starray EM-i); Malaysia: Proton City, Tanjong Malim, Perak (PTMSB); Brazil: Curitiba, Paraná (Renault Geely do Brasil)

Body and chassis
- Class: Compact SUV (C-segment)
- Body style: 5-door crossover SUV
- Layout: Front-motor, front-wheel-drive (EV); Front-engine, front-motor, front-wheel drive (EM-i)
- Platform: Global Energy Architecture
- Related: Geely Galaxy E5 / Geely EX5; Geely Galaxy A7

Powertrain
- Engine: Petrol plug-in hybrid: 1.5 L BHE15-BFN I4 (EM-i); Petrol plug-in hybrid (REEV): 1.5 L BHE15-BFN I4 (EM-R)
- Electric motor: Highly integrated 11-in-1 System Permanent magnet synchronous
- Power output: 193 kW (259 hp; 262 PS) (EM-i); 160 kW (215 hp; 218 PS) (EV / EM-R); 175 kW (235 hp; 238 PS) (EM-R)
- Transmission: 1-speed E-DHT (EM-i)
- Hybrid drivetrain: Plug-in hybrid (EM-i); Range extender PHEV (EM-R)
- Battery: Plug-in hybrid (EM-i): 8.5 kWh Aegis Short Blade LFP CALB; 18.4 kWh Aegis Short Blade LFP CATL; 19.09 kWh Aegis Short Blade LFP SVOLT; 29.8 kWh Aegis Short Blade LFP Farasis; Plug-in hybrid Range Extender (EM-R): 18.4 kWh Aegis Short Blade LFP CATL; 27.28 kWh Aegis Short Blade LFP; Battery electric: 60.22 kWh Aegis Short Blade LFP; 68.39 kWh Aegis Short Blade LFP

Dimensions
- Wheelbase: 2,755 mm (108.5 in)
- Length: 4,740–4,750 mm (186.6–187.0 in)
- Width: 1,905 mm (75.0 in)
- Height: 1,685 mm (66.3 in)
- Curb weight: 1,610–1,724 kg (3,549–3,801 lb) (EM-i)

The Geely Galaxy Starship 7 (Chinese: 吉利银河星舰7; pinyin: Jílì Yínhé Xīngjiàn 7) is a compact SUV manufactured by Geely Auto under the Geely Galaxy product line.

The model was first introduced in October 2024 as a plug-in hybrid model called the Geely Galaxy Starship 7 EM-i and went on production in the following month. It is the first vehicle under the "Starship" (星舰; Xīngjiàn) series, and the first vehicle to utilize the NordThor EM-i 2.0 plug-in hybrid powertrain. In 2025, Geely will introduce a battery electric model called the Geely Galaxy Starship 7 EV.

The plug-in hybrid version is sold outside China as the Geely EX5 EM-i in most countries, the Geely E5 EM-i in South Africa, and the Geely Starray EM-i in Australia, Indonesia and Spain, reusing the Starray nameplate from the export model of the Geely Boyue L.

Proton, which has been a subsidiary of Geely since 2017, also marketed and sold the vehicle as the Proton eMas 7 PHEV (stylised as e.MAS 7 PHEV) in Malaysia as the brand's first plug-in hybrid electric vehicle.

== Overview ==
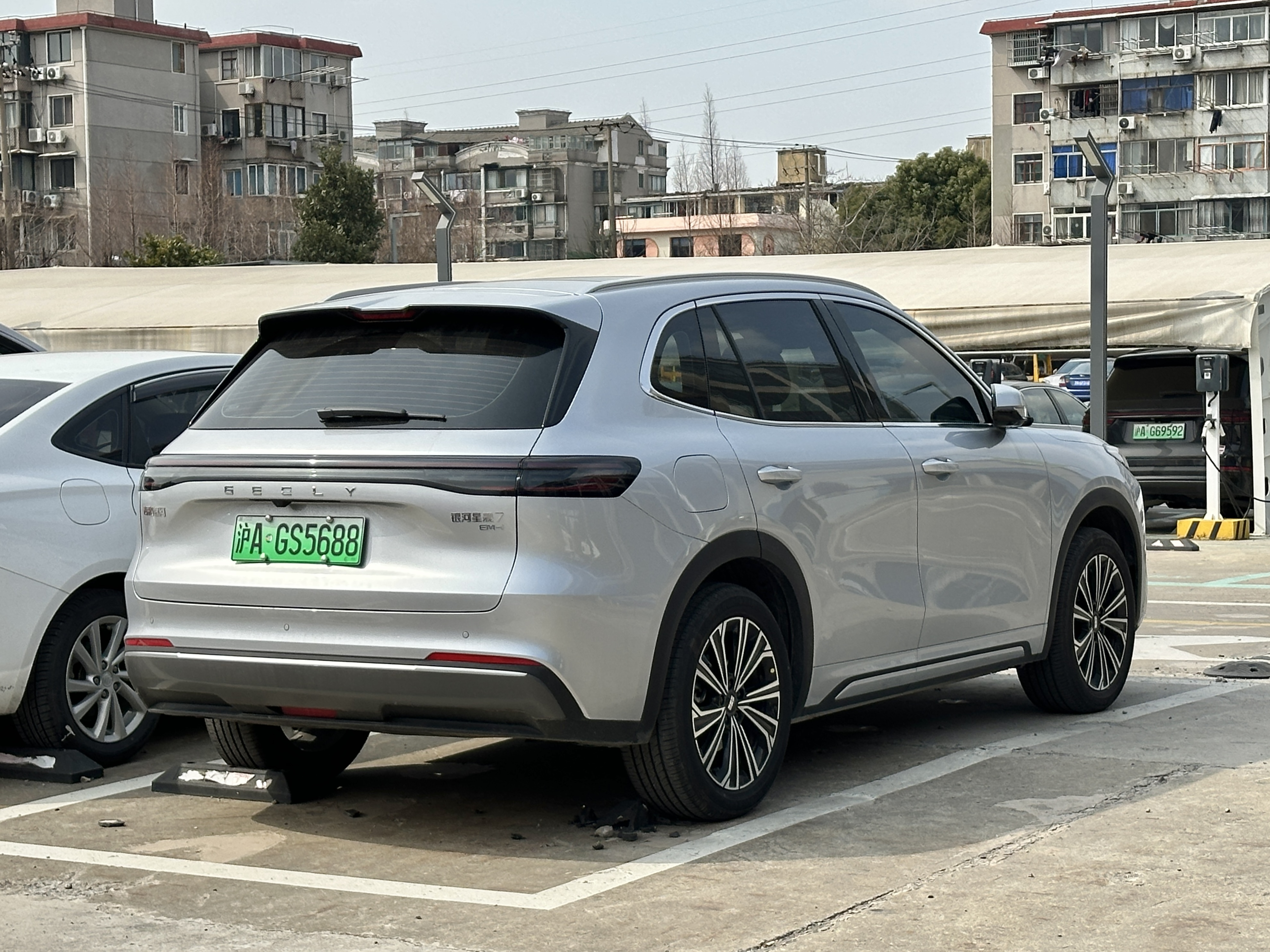
Rear view

The vehicle was first introduced by Geely Galaxy with a set of images on 22 October 2024. The model started pre-sales on 8 November 2024. Its styling, including some body panels, largely mirrored the Geely EX5, both sharing the same Global Intelligent New Energy Architecture (GEA) vehicle platform. The vehicle adopts the second-generation NordThor 2.0 powertrain, badged as EM-i, became the first vehicle to use the powertrain.

The EM-i system employs a 1.5-liter four-cylinder engine designed with modifications to enhance air swirl within the combustion chamber, achieving a reported thermal efficiency of 46.5%, slightly ahead of BYD's DM-i 5.0 plug-in hybrid powertrain. The engine delivers an output of 111 PS (109 hp; 82 kW) and 136 N⋅m (13.9 kg⋅m; 100 lb⋅ft) of torque. This engine is paired with an 11-to-1 electrified dedicated hybrid transmission (E-DHT) that includes both the P1 integrated starter-generator and the P3 drive motor, generating a combined output of 160 kW (215 hp; 218 PS) and 262 N⋅m (26.7 kg⋅m; 193 lb⋅ft) of torque. The vehicle is capable of accelerating from 0–100 km/h (0–62 mph) in 7.5 seconds.

The EM-i version offers two Aegis Short Blade lithium iron phosphate (LFP) battery options: an 8.5 kWh battery with an all-electric range of 55 km (34 mi) on the CLTC cycle and a larger 19.09 kWh battery providing up to 120 km (75 mi) of electric range. Combined with a 51-litre fuel tank and the petrol engine, the total driving range reaches up to 1,420 km (882 mi), with fuel consumption rated at 3.75 l/100 km (27 km/l; 63 mpg_{‑US}).

The EM-i version is also equipped with DC fast charging capabilities with a maximum input rate of approximately 36 kW. According to Geely, charging the battery from 30% to 80% takes 20 minutes. Additionally, the model features a vehicle-to-load (V2L) function.

The software of the vehicle adopts the Flyme Auto car operating system and the Flyme Sound audio system developed in conjunction with Meizu, which is owned by Geely.

The BEV version of the Starship 7 is simply called the Geely Galaxy Starship 7 EV. Featuring a restyled front bumper, the Starship 7 EV was unveiled during Auto Beijing 2026 with the powertrain being a front positioned motor producing 160 kW. The battery options include a 60.22 kWh battery and a 68.39 kWh battery, with CLTC ranges of 525km and 605km respectively.

=== Records ===
The vehicle was officially listed in the Guinness World Records for the lowest fuel consumption driving the Sydney–Melbourne Coastal Drive by a plug-in hybrid powered production sport utility vehicle (SUV) from 9-10 December 2025. The Sydney–Melbourne Coastal Drive covered 1,056 km (656 mi) and the vehicle achieved a verified fuel consumption figure of 3.83 L/100 km (61.4 mpg_{‑US}), bettered its own official NEDC fuel consumption figure of 4.4 L/100 km (53 mpg_{‑US}).

== Powertrain ==
| Type | Engine | | | Trans. | Battery | | Electric motor | | | Electric range | | | Charging | | 0–100 km/h (62 mph) | Calendar years |
| Type | Displ. | Power | Torque | Trans. | Type | Weight | Type | Power | Torque | WLTP | CLTC | NEDC | Peak DC | 30–80% | 0–100 km/h (62 mph) | Calendar years |
EM-i (PHEV)
| 1.5 L 55 km | BHE15-BFN 1,499 cc (1.5 L) I4 | 82 kW (110 hp; 111 PS) | 136 N⋅m (13.9 kg⋅m; 100 lb⋅ft) | 1-speed E-DHT | 8.5 kWh LFP Aegis Short Blade | 99 kg (218 lb) | Front: TZ220WY075 PMSM | 160 kW (215 hp; 218 PS) | 262 N⋅m (26.7 kg⋅m; 193 lb⋅ft) | 45 km (28 mi) | 55 km (34 mi) | — | — | — | 7.5 sec | 2024–25 |
| 1.5 L 120 km | BHE15-BFN 1,499 cc (1.5 L) I4 | 82 kW (110 hp; 111 PS) | 136 N⋅m (13.9 kg⋅m; 100 lb⋅ft) | 1-speed E-DHT | 19.09 kWh LFP Aegis Short Blade | 178 kg (392 lb) | Front: TZ220WY075 PMSM | 160 kW (215 hp; 218 PS) | 262 N⋅m (26.7 kg⋅m; 193 lb⋅ft) | 101–105 km (63–65 mi) | 120 km (75 mi) | — | 36 kW | 18 min | 7.5 sec | 2024–present |
| 1.5 L 105 km (export) | BHE15-BFN 1,499 cc (1.5 L) I4 | 73 kW (98 hp; 99 PS) @6,000rpm | 125 N⋅m (12.7 kg⋅m; 92.2 lb⋅ft) @4,250—4,750rpm | 1-speed E-DHT | 18.4 kWh LFP Aegis Short Blade | 183 kg (403 lb) | Front: TZ220WY075 PMSM | 160 kW (215 hp; 218 PS) | 262 N⋅m (26.7 kg⋅m; 193 lb⋅ft) | 82 km (51 mi) | — | 105 km (65 mi) | 30 kW | <20 min | 7.5 sec | 2025–present |
| 1.5 L 136 km (export) | BHE15-BFN 1,499 cc (1.5 L) I4 | 73 kW (98 hp; 99 PS) @6,000rpm | 125 N⋅m (12.7 kg⋅m; 92.2 lb⋅ft) @4,250—4,750rpm | 1-speed E-DHT | 29.8 kWh LFP Aegis Short Blade | 225 kg (496 lb) | Front: TZ220WY075 PMSM | 160 kW (215 hp; 218 PS) | 262 N⋅m (26.7 kg⋅m; 193 lb⋅ft) | 135 km (84 mi) | — | | 60 kW | 20 min | 7.5 sec | 2025–present |
EM-R (Range Extender PHEV)
| 1.5 L 160 kW | BHE15-BFN 1,499 cc (1.5 L) I4 (Generator) | 73 kW (98 hp; 99 PS) | 136 N⋅m (13.9 kg⋅m; 100 lb⋅ft) | 1-speed E-DHT | 18.4 kWh LFP Aegis Short Blade | | Front: TZ220WY075 PMSM | 160 kW (215 hp; 218 PS) | 262 N⋅m (26.7 kg⋅m; 193 lb⋅ft) | | | — | — | — | 7.5 sec | 2026–present |
| 1.5 L 175 kW | BHE15-BFN 1,499 cc (1.5 L) I4 (Generator) | 82 kW (110 hp; 111 PS) | 136 N⋅m (13.9 kg⋅m; 100 lb⋅ft) | 1-speed E-DHT | 27.28 kWh LFP Aegis Short Blade | | Front: TZ220WY075 PMSM | 175 kW (235 hp; 238 PS) | | | | — | — | 18 min | | 2026–present |
EV
| EV | — | — | — | — | 60.22 kWh LFP | 483 kg (1,065 lb) | Front | 160 kW (215 hp; 218 PS) | 300 N⋅m (30.6 kg⋅m; 221 lb⋅ft) | | 525 km (326 mi) | | | 20 min | | 2026–present |
| EV | — | — | — | — | 68.39 kWh LFP | 483 kg (1,065 lb) | Front | 160 kW (215 hp; 218 PS) | 300 N⋅m (30.6 kg⋅m; 221 lb⋅ft) | | 605 km (376 mi) | | | 20 min | | 2026–present |

== Markets ==
=== Asia ===
==== Indonesia ====
The Starray EM-i was made available for pre-orders in Indonesia on 28 August 2025, and was launched on 29 October 2025. Locally assembled in Purwakarta, West Java, it is available in the sole variant using the 18.4 kWh battery pack.

==== Philippines ====
The EX5 EM-i was launched in the Philippines on 27 March 2026, with two variants: Pro and Max, both variants use the 18.4 kWh battery pack.

==== Thailand ====
The Starray EM-R made its global debut in Thailand on 13 August 2026. It is offered in two trims, Pro and Max, both using the same 18.4 kWh battery pack as the entry-level EM-i.

The EM-R is Geely's first range extender (REEV) model to be sold globally, and the first REEV variant of the Starship 7. It is derived from the existing EM-i plug-in hybrid by removing the clutch that connects the 1.5-litre engine to the front wheels, so the engine functions solely as a generator rather than being able to drive the wheels directly at higher speeds as in the PHEV.

Thailand classifies any vehicle driven purely by an electric motor as an EV, regardless of whether a combustion engine is present to generate that electricity. As a result, REEVs such as the Starray EM-R are subject to a 20 percent import tax rate, compared with 80 percent for combustion-engined vehicles, including PHEVs.

==== Vietnam ====
The EX5 EM-i was launched in Vietnam on 27 March 2026, alongside the EX2. It is available with three variants: Pro, Max and Ultra. The Pro and Max variants use the 18.4 kWh battery pack, while the Ultra variant use the larger 29.8 kWh battery pack.

=== Belarus ===
The X80 PHEV was launched in Belarus on 26 September 2025.

=== Europe ===
The Starray EM-i was introduced in Europe in November 2025, starting in Poland as the first European country to debut the model. Followed by European market debuts in Italy, United Kingdom and Hungary, and a 48-hour market rollout in five key European markets: Germany, Spain, the Netherlands, Belgium, and Luxembourg.

=== Latin America ===
==== Brazil ====
The EX5 EM-i was launched in Brazil on 15 April 2026. Initially imported from China, it is available with three trim levels: Pro, Max and Ultra.

==== Mexico ====
The EX5 EM-i went on sale in Mexico on 14 October 2025 in the sole variant. At the time of its introduction, the EX5 EM-i was the cheapest plug-in hybrid electric vehicle (PHEV) on sale in Mexico.

=== Oceania ===
==== Australia ====
The Starray EM-i went on sale in Australia on 22 August 2025, with customer deliveries commencing in October 2025. It is available with two variants: Complete and Inspire, both variants use the 18.4 kWh battery pack. In May 2026, the Inspire variant was upgraded with a larger 29.8 kWh battery pack from the Extended Range version.

==== New Zealand ====
The Starray EM-i was launched in New Zealand on 18 September 2025, with two variants: Complete and Inspire, both variants use the 18.4 kWh battery pack.

=== South Africa ===
The Starray EM-i was launched in South Africa on 20 November 2025 as the Geely E5 EM-i, alongside the battery electric Geely E5, as one of Geely's first models to be marketed in the country. It is available in two variants: Aspire and Apex, both variants use the 18.4 kWh battery pack.

== Proton eMas 7 PHEV ==
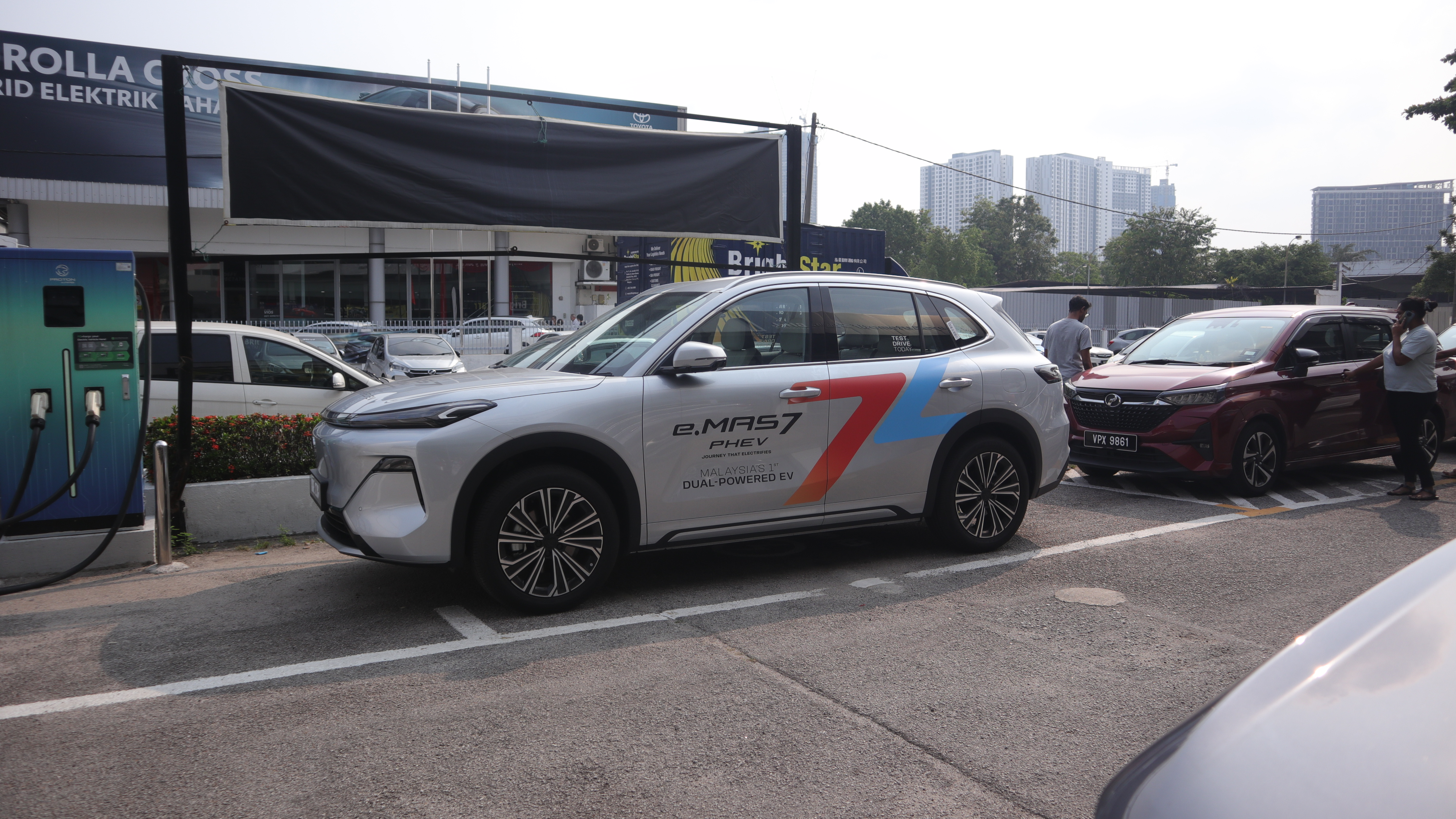
Proton eMas 7 PHEV

In Malaysia, the Galaxy Starship 7 is sold by the local automaker Proton, by its sub brand, Proton eMas as the Proton eMas 7 PHEV. It was first unveiled as a camouflaged prototype vehicle on 4 December 2025. The production model was unveiled on 13 January 2026, as Proton's first plug-in hybrid electric vehicle (PHEV). The eMas 7 PHEV was launched on 4 February 2026, with three variants: Prime, Premium and Premium Plus. The Prime and Premium variants use the 18.4 kWh battery pack, while the Premium Plus variant use the larger 29.8 kWh battery pack.

== Safety ==
Euro NCAP test results Geely Starray EM-i 'Comfort' (LHD) (2025)
| Test | Points | % |
|---|---|---|
| Overall: | 5 /5 stars | |
| Adult occupant: | 36.2 | 90% |
| Child occupant: | 42.7 | 86% |
| Pedestrian: | 54.4 | 86% |
| Safety assist: | 14.0 | 77% |

ANCAP test results Geely Starray EM-i (2025, aligned with Euro NCAP)
| Test | Points | % |
|---|---|---|
| Overall: | 5 /5 stars | |
| Adult occupant: | 36.23 | 90% |
| Child occupant: | 41.81 | 87% |
| Pedestrian: | 54.44 | 86% |
| Safety assist: | 14.92 | 82% |

== Sales ==
| Year | China | Australia | Mexico | Indonesia |
|---|---|---|---|---|
| 2024 | 20,636 | | — | |
| 2025 | 101,637 | 1,066 | 1,920 | 166 |

== See also ==
- List of Geely vehicles
