= BelGee =

Belarusian and Chinese car manufacturer

CJSC BelGee
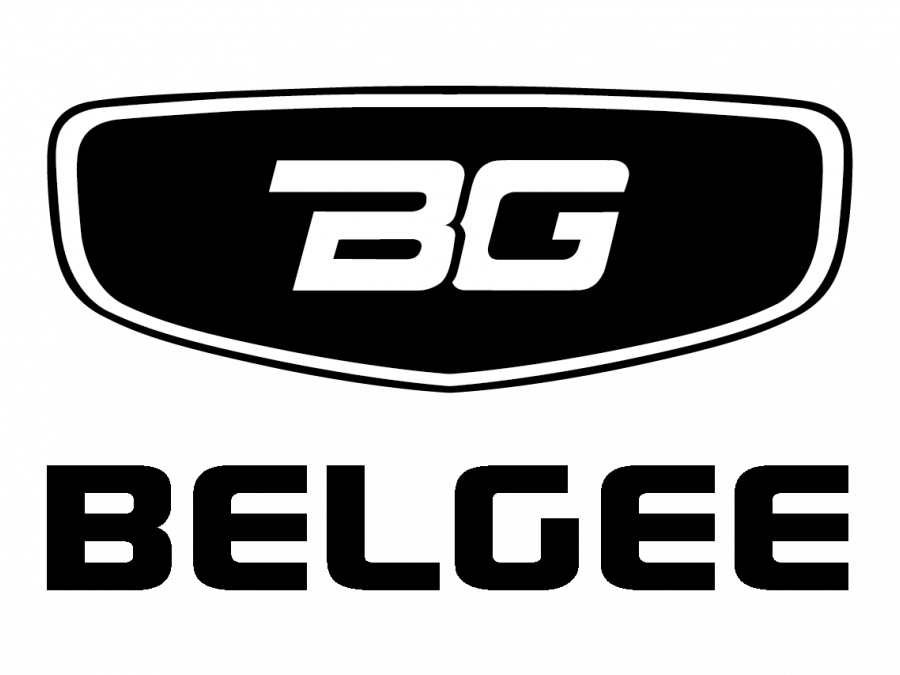
- Native name: СЗАО «Белджи»
- Type: Joint venture
- Industry: Automotive
- Founded: 2011
- Headquarters: Barysaw, Belarus
- Owners: Belarus state (51.49%); Zhejiang Jirun Automobile Company Limited (Geely Auto) (33.47%); Shenzhen Shentou Investment Company Limited (9.01%); CITIC International Investment (6.03%)
- Website: belgee.by

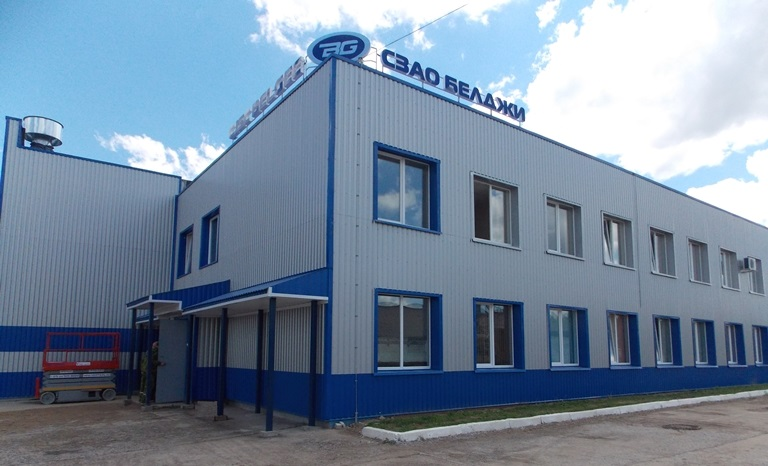
BelGee headquarters in Belarus

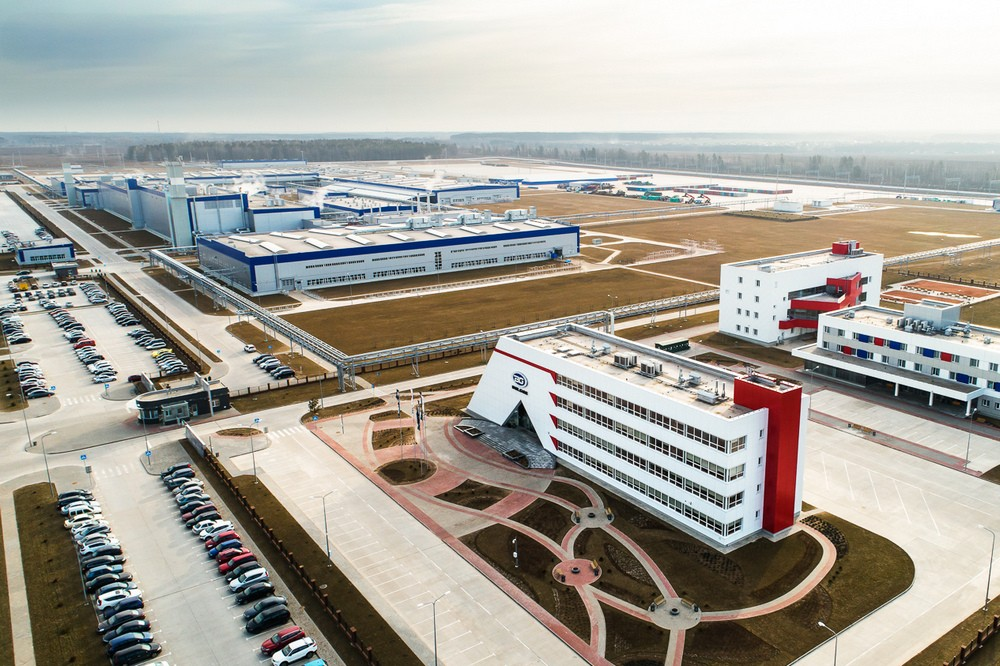
BelGee headquarters in Barysaw, Belarus

BelGee is a Belarusian joint venture mainly controlled by the Belarus state and the Chinese car manufacturer Geely. The venture was established in 2011 and produces Geely and Geely-based cars.

== Company ==
Belgee is a joint venture established by Geely and Belarusian automaker BelAZ. It began line production at its Belarusian plant, which has an initial capacity of 60,000 car bodies per year, with the possibility of expansion. The opening ceremony was attended by high-ranking officials from China and Belarus, indicating the importance of the collaboration. The joint venture is the culmination of thorough preparation, and its opening represents a significant milestone for both companies.

The company assembles Geely designed cars in a new factory located in Barysaw District from a knock-down kit, starting with production of 25,000 cars in 2018, with capacity to grow to 60,000 units a year by 2020, with 90% of production expected to be sold locally. By November 2017, the factory employed 760 staff.

later in November 2017, it inaugurated a complete knock-down (CKD) plant with a yearly production capacity of 60,000 vehicles in the Minsk region, which can be expanded in the future. BelAZ owns 58.162% of the company while China's Zhejang Jirun Automobile Co. Ltd. owns 36.092%.

The Belgee facility, situated in Borisov and spanning across 118 hectares, aims to produce 60,000 automobiles annually with a 50% localization rate. The plant will be responsible for assembling the Atlas and other advanced Geely models of the third generation for the Commonwealth of Independent States (CIS) market, which includes countries such as Belarus, Russia, and Kazakhstan. Since its launch in 2016, the Atlas has garnered sales of more than 330,000 units, with 228,000 units sold in the first ten months of 2017, positioning it as one of the most sought-after sports utility vehicles in China.

By 2021, the company was owned by BelAZ (51.49%), SOYUZ Soyuzavtotekhnologiyi (9.01%), Geely (Zhejiang Jirun Automobile Company Limited, 33.47%) and CITIC International Investment (6.03%). That year, the company transferred the BelAZ shares to the Belarusian state in order to reduce the impact of sanctions from Western countries.

== Products ==
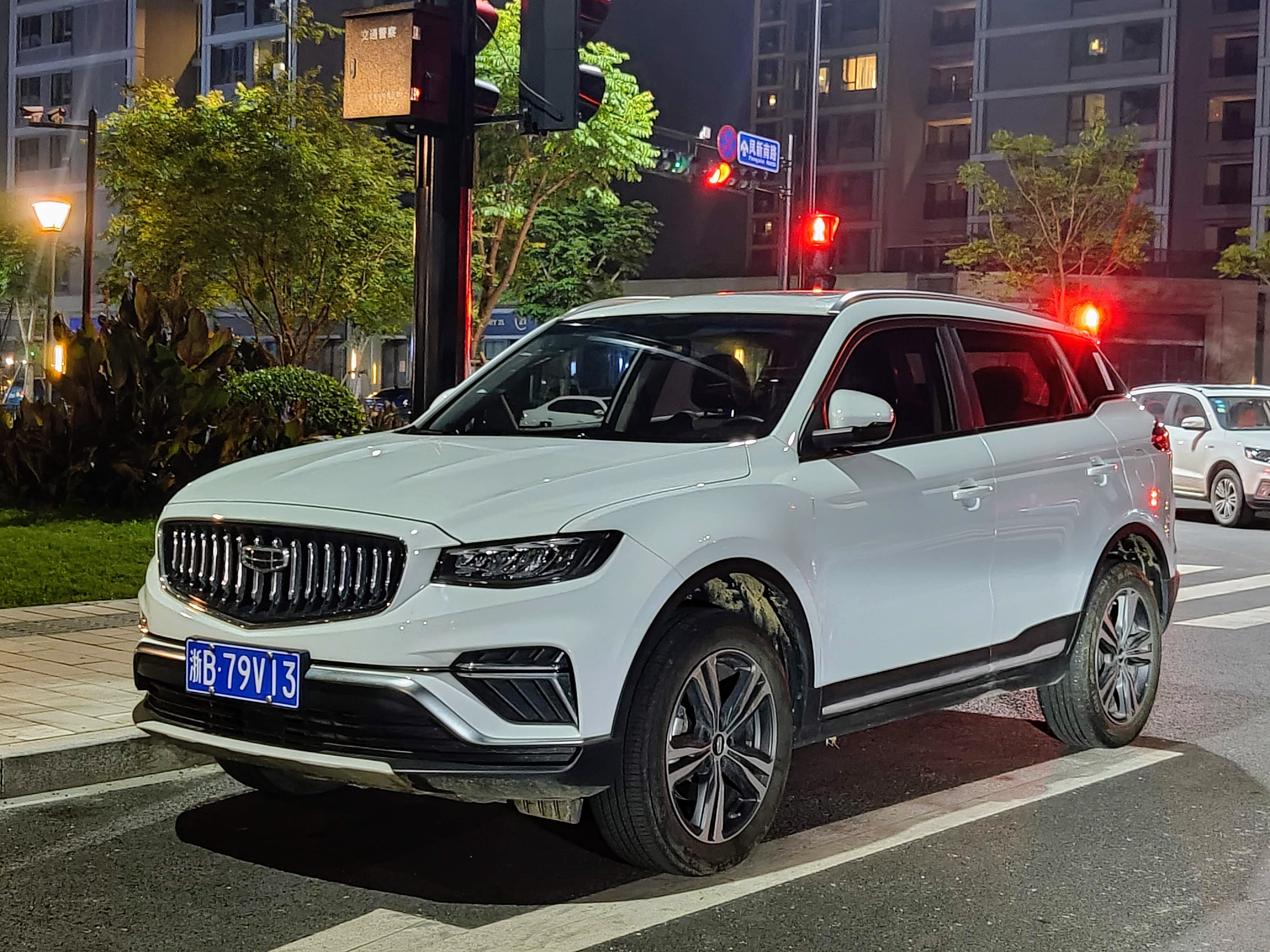
Geely Boyue

The first car of the production line is the Geely Atlas NL3 (also known as Boyue in other markets). Production of the Geely Emgrand 7 commenced in the autumn of 2018.
