= Luxgen URX =

Mid-size crossover SUV

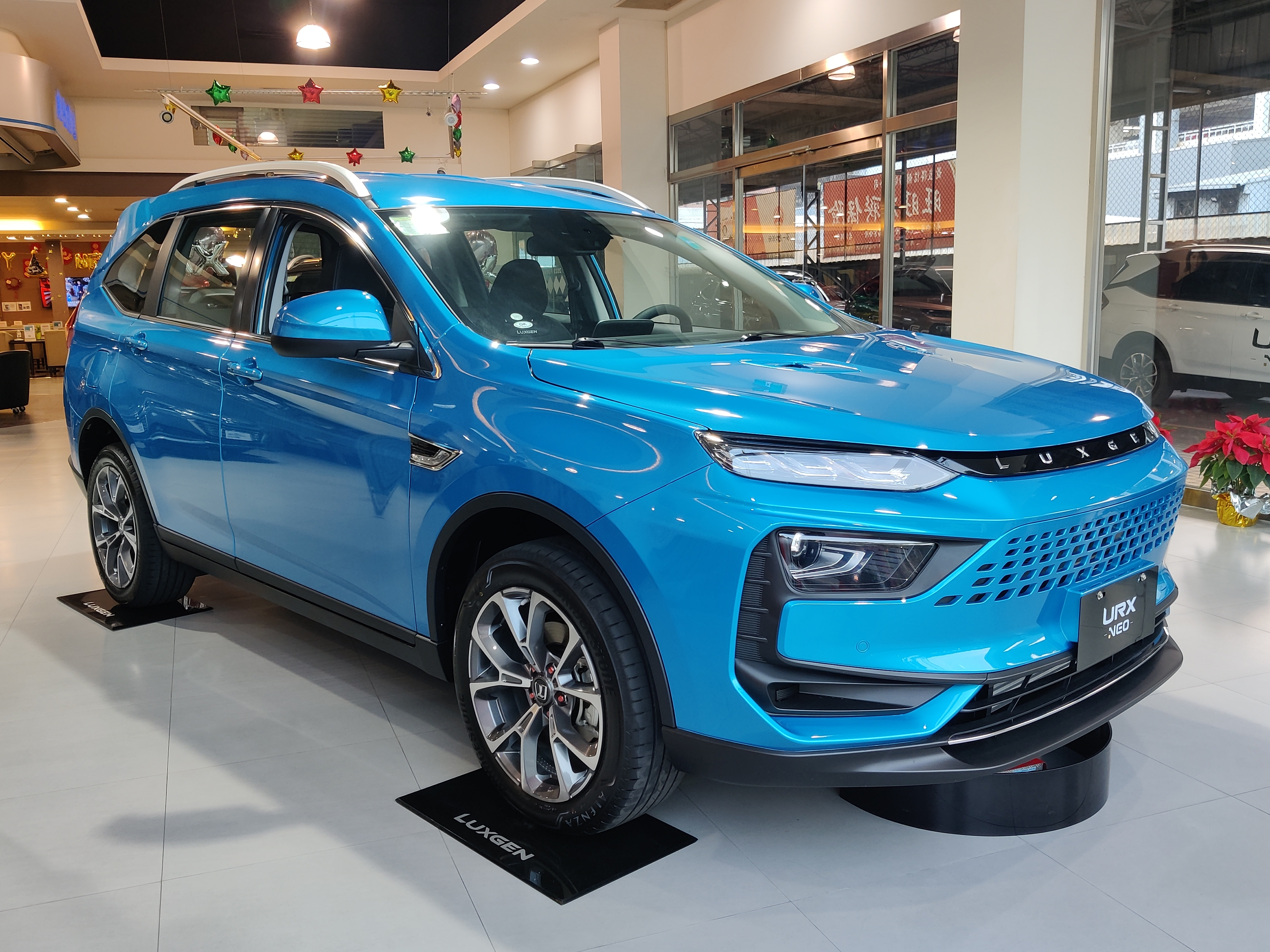
- Luxgen URX Neo

Overview
- Manufacturer: Luxgen
- Also called: Luxgen URX Neo (2022–present)
- Production: 2019–present; 2019–2022 (URX); 2022–present (URX Neo)
- Assembly: Taiwan: Miaoli; China: Hangzhou (Dongfeng Yulon, until 2020)

Body and chassis
- Class: Mid-size crossover SUV
- Body style: 5-door SUV
- Layout: Front-engine, front-wheel-drive
- Related: Luxgen U6

Powertrain
- Engine: Petrol: 1.8 L G18TG I4 turbo
- Power output: 152 kW (204 hp; 207 PS)
- Transmission: 6-speed manumatic

Dimensions
- Wheelbase: 2,720 mm (107.1 in)
- Length: 4,725 mm (186.0 in)
- Width: 1,826 mm (71.9 in)
- Height: 1,765 mm (69.5 in)
- Curb weight: 1,585–1,630 kg (3,494–3,594 lb)

The Luxgen URX is a 7-seater mid-size crossover SUV produced by the Taiwanese car company Luxgen.

== Overview ==
The URX was developed under Yulon's R&D center, HAITEC. Based on the same platform as, but being positioned above the Luxgen U6 compact crossover, the URX crossover can provide up to 7 seats and even a special platform in the luggage area for wheelchair and cargo storage. It was first launched in Taiwan in 2019, and is priced at NT$848,000 to NT$1.12 million (US$28,021 to US$37,009).

The URX is powered by a turbocharged 1.8 liter engine with 204 hp (152 kW) and 300 N⋅m (221 lbf⋅ft). Gearbox is a 6-speed manumatic transmission.

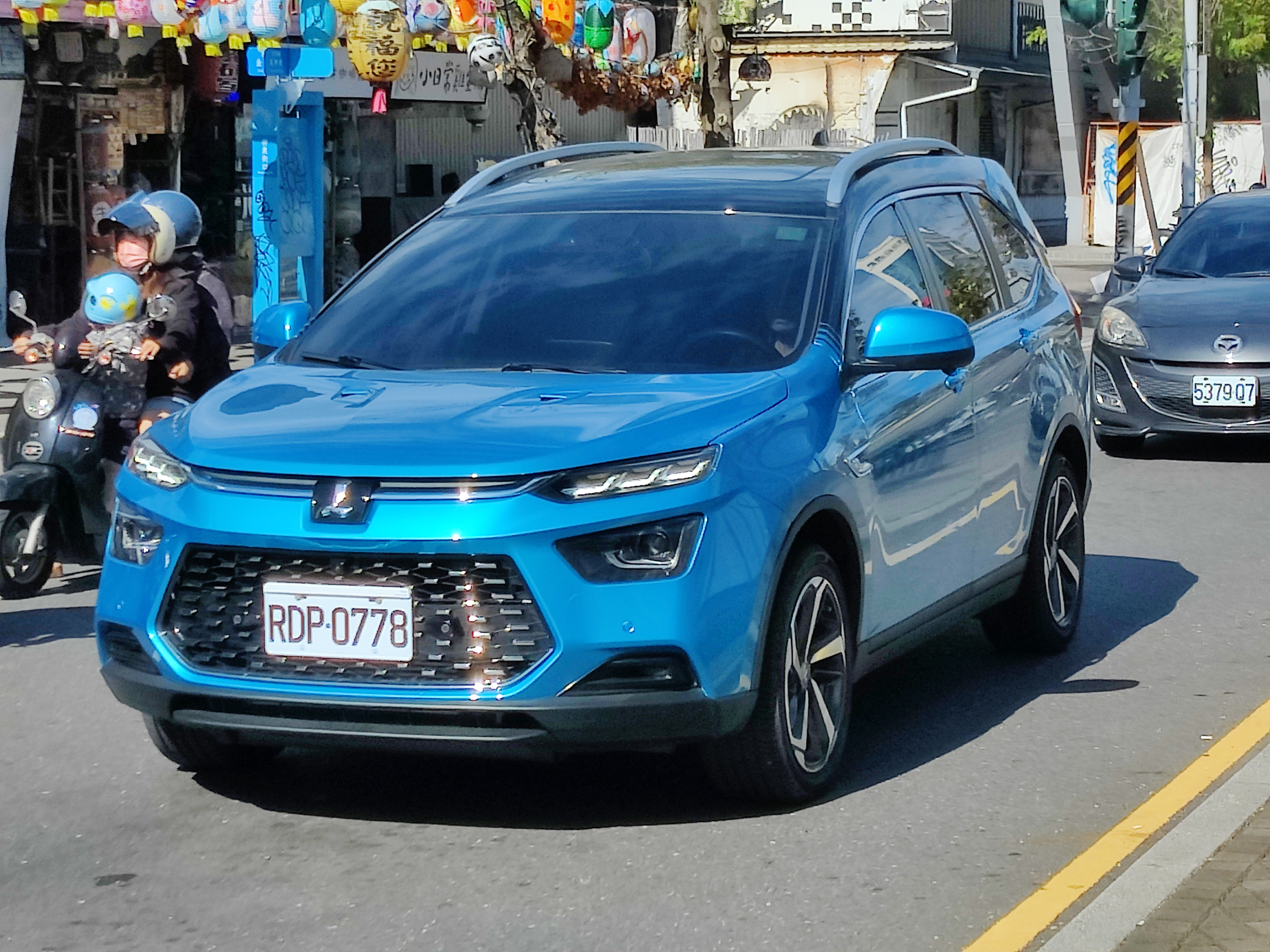
Luxgen URX front quarter

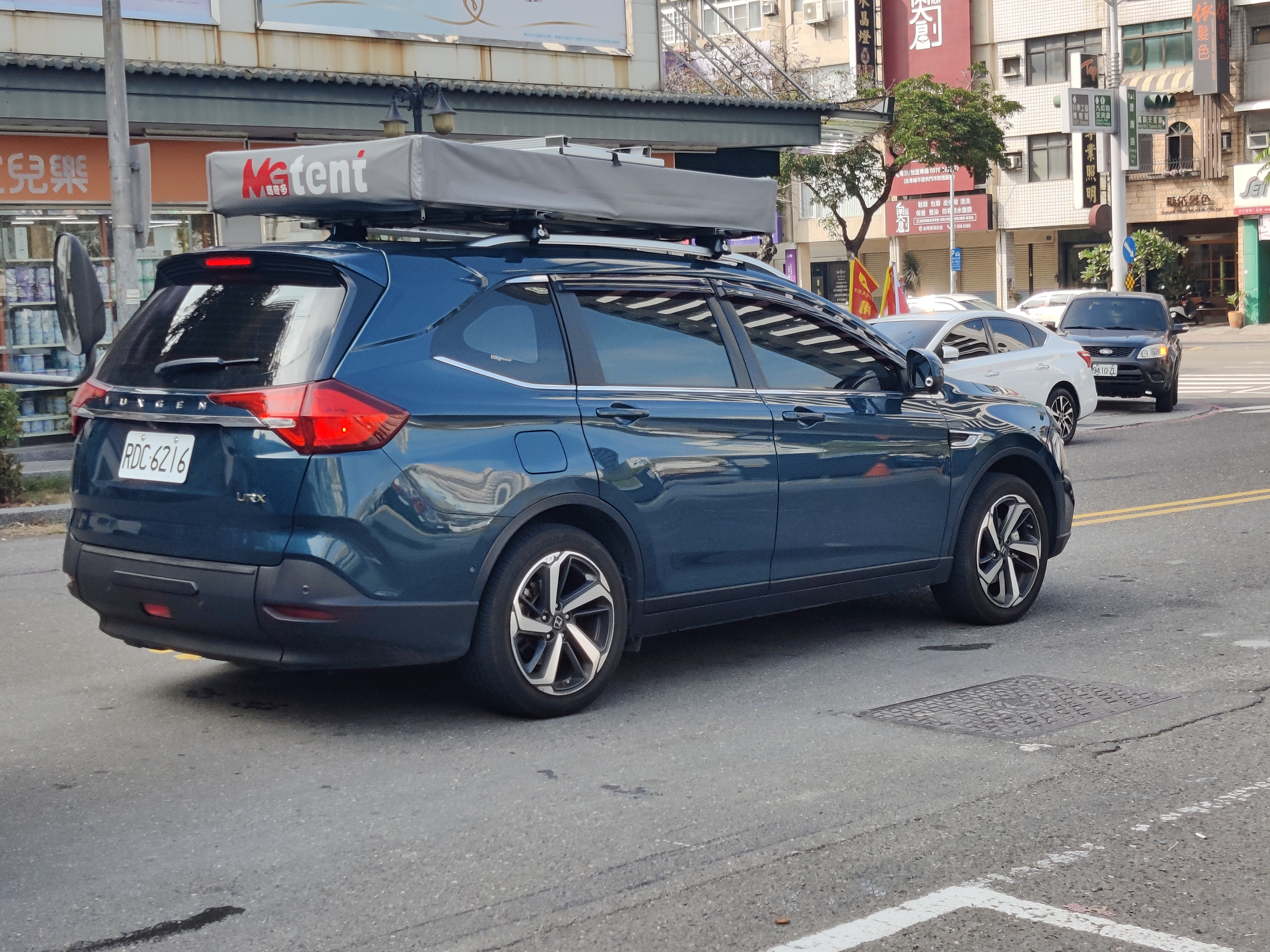
Luxgen URX rear quarter

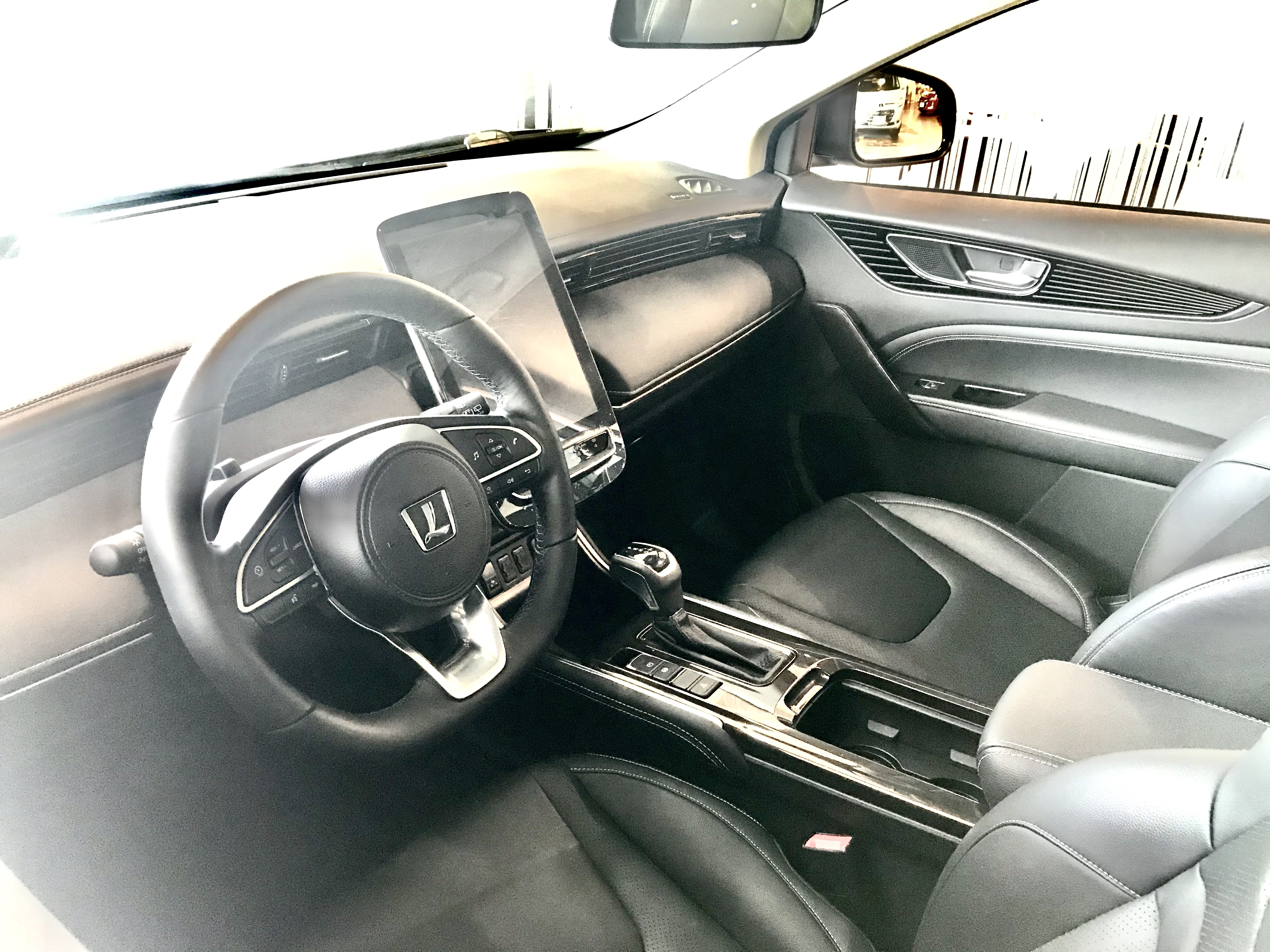
Luxgen URX interior

== URX Neo ==
The URX received a facelift for the 2023 model year called the URX Neo. The URX Neo features a redesigned front fascia and full-width tail lights while powertrain remains unchanged. The redesigned instrument panel information is integrated and projected on the HUD head-up display through AR augmented reality, and a 12-inch HD touch screen is used to display various items of driving information and adjust the settings of various functions of the vehicle. The central control touch screen host has introduced the Luxgen Think+ 5.0 human factor interface, and increased the resolution of the AR view to 1.2 million pixels.

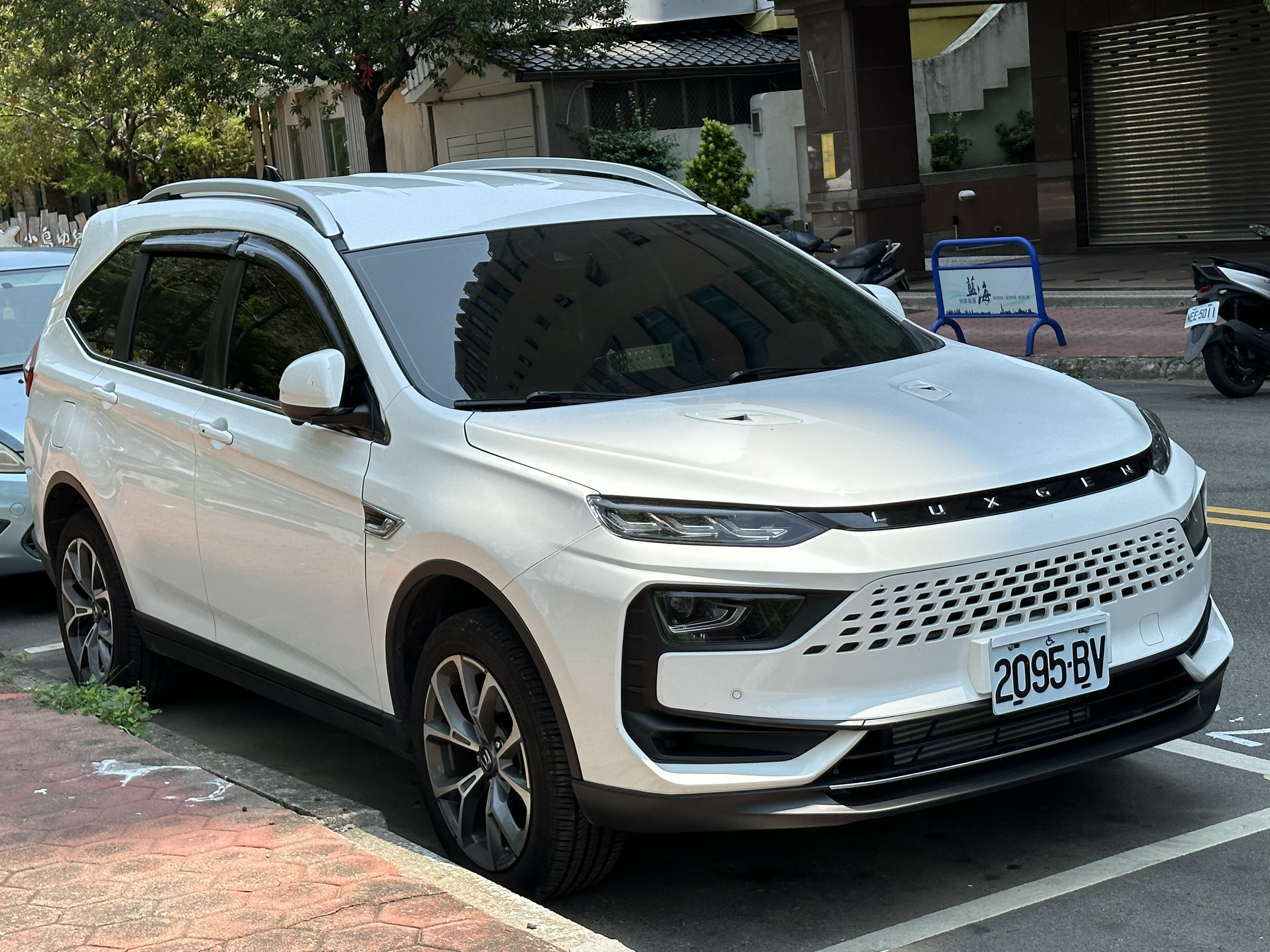
Luxgen URX Neo front quarter

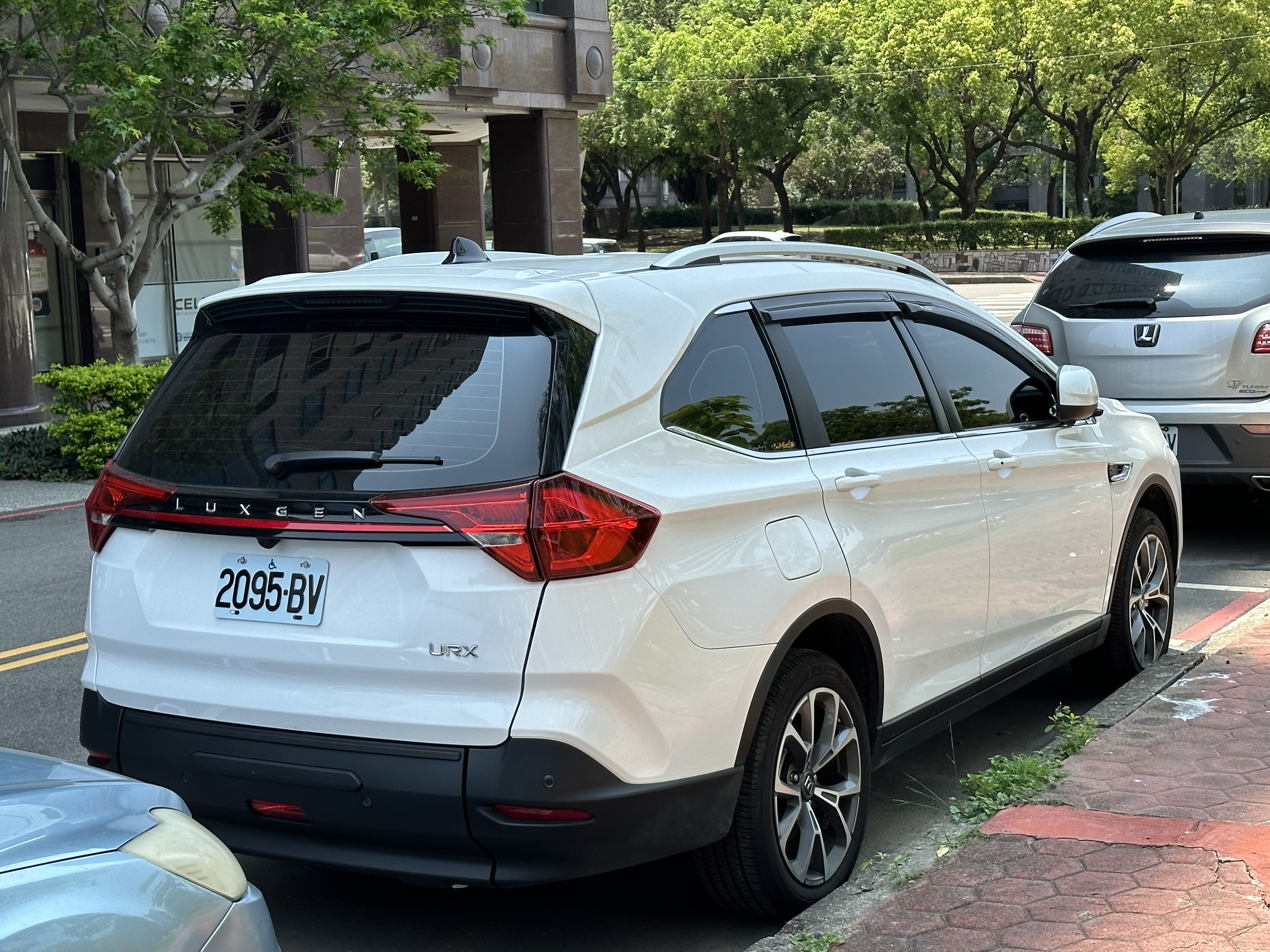
Luxgen URX Neo rear quarter

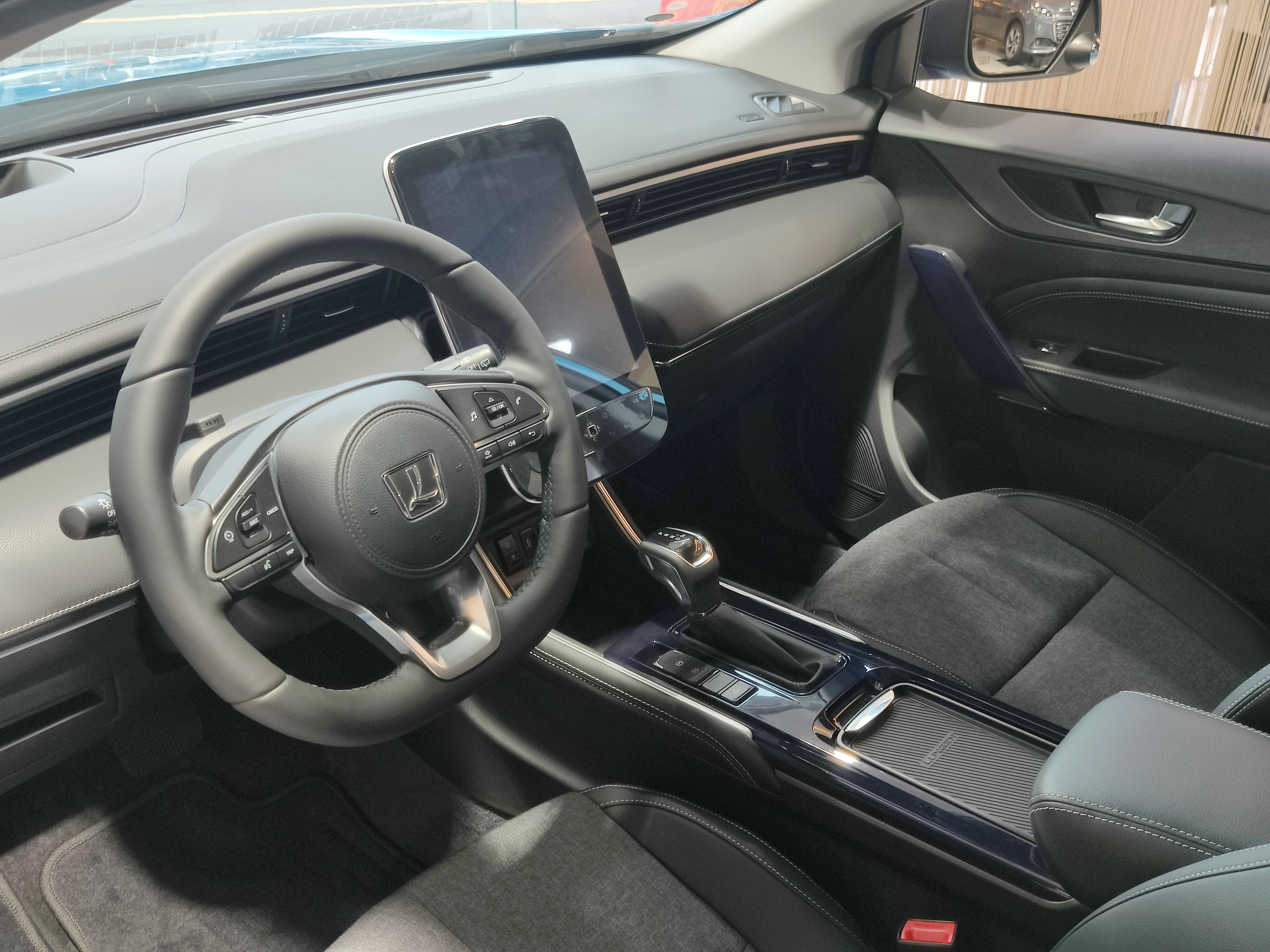
Luxgen URX Neo interior
