= Dongfeng Yulon =

Chinese automobile manufacturing company

Dongfeng Yulon Motor Co., Ltd.
- Native name: 东风裕隆汽车有限公司
- Company type: Joint venture
- Industry: Automotive
- Founded: December 14, 2010; 15 years ago
- Defunct: 2020
- Fate: Bankruptcy
- Successor: Luxgen
- Headquarters: Hangzhou, Zhejiang, China
- Area served: China
- Products: Automobiles
- Owner: Dongfeng Motor Corporation (50%); Yulon Motor (50%)
- Website: www.dfyl-luxgen.com (in Chinese)

Dongfeng Yulon Motor Co., Ltd.
- Simplified Chinese: 东风裕隆汽车有限公司
- Traditional Chinese: 東風裕隆汽車有限公司
Transcriptions
Standard Mandarin
- Hanyu Pinyin: Dōngfēng Yùlóng Qìchē Yǒuxiàn Gōngsī

Dongfeng Yulon
- Simplified Chinese: 东风裕隆
- Traditional Chinese: 東風裕隆
Transcriptions
Standard Mandarin
- Hanyu Pinyin: Dōngfēng Yùlóng

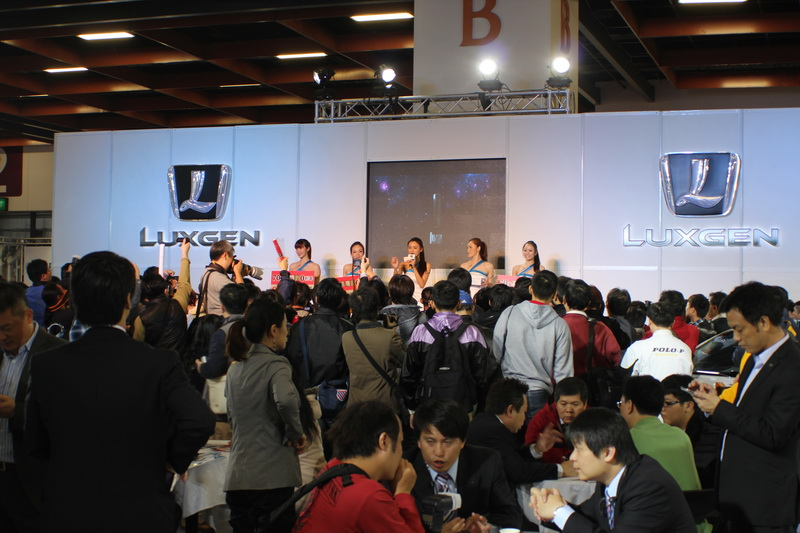
Dongfeng Yulon Booth

Dongfeng Yulon Motor Co., Ltd. (Dongfeng Yulon) was an automobile manufacturing company headquartered in Hangzhou, China and a 50:50 joint venture between the mainland Chinese automaker Dongfeng Motor Corporation and the Taiwanese automaker Yulon Motor. Its principal activity was the production, distribution and sale of Luxgen passenger cars in mainland China.

== History ==
On 29 July 2010, Dongfeng Motor obtained approval from the National Development and Reform Commission of China for the establishment of a joint venture with Yulon Motor.

Dongfeng Yulon was formally established on 14 December 2010, with the two partners agreeing to invest an initial 3.4 billion yuan (US$510 million) in the venture.

Dongfeng Yulon began production of its first model, the Luxgen 7 SUV, on 28 July 2011. Mainland China sales of the Luxgen 7 began in October 2011.

Due to declining sales of the past years, Dongfeng Yulon entered bankruptcy liquidation in November 2020.

== Products ==
Dongfeng Yulon currently produces the following vehicles:

- Luxgen S3 (1.6 litre)
- Luxgen S5 (1.8 and 2.0 litre)
- Luxgen U5
- Luxgen U6 (1.8 and 2.0 litre)
- Luxgen M7 (2.0 litre)
- Luxgen CEO MPV (2.2 litre)
- Luxgen U7 (2.0 and 2.2 litre)
- Luxgen URX
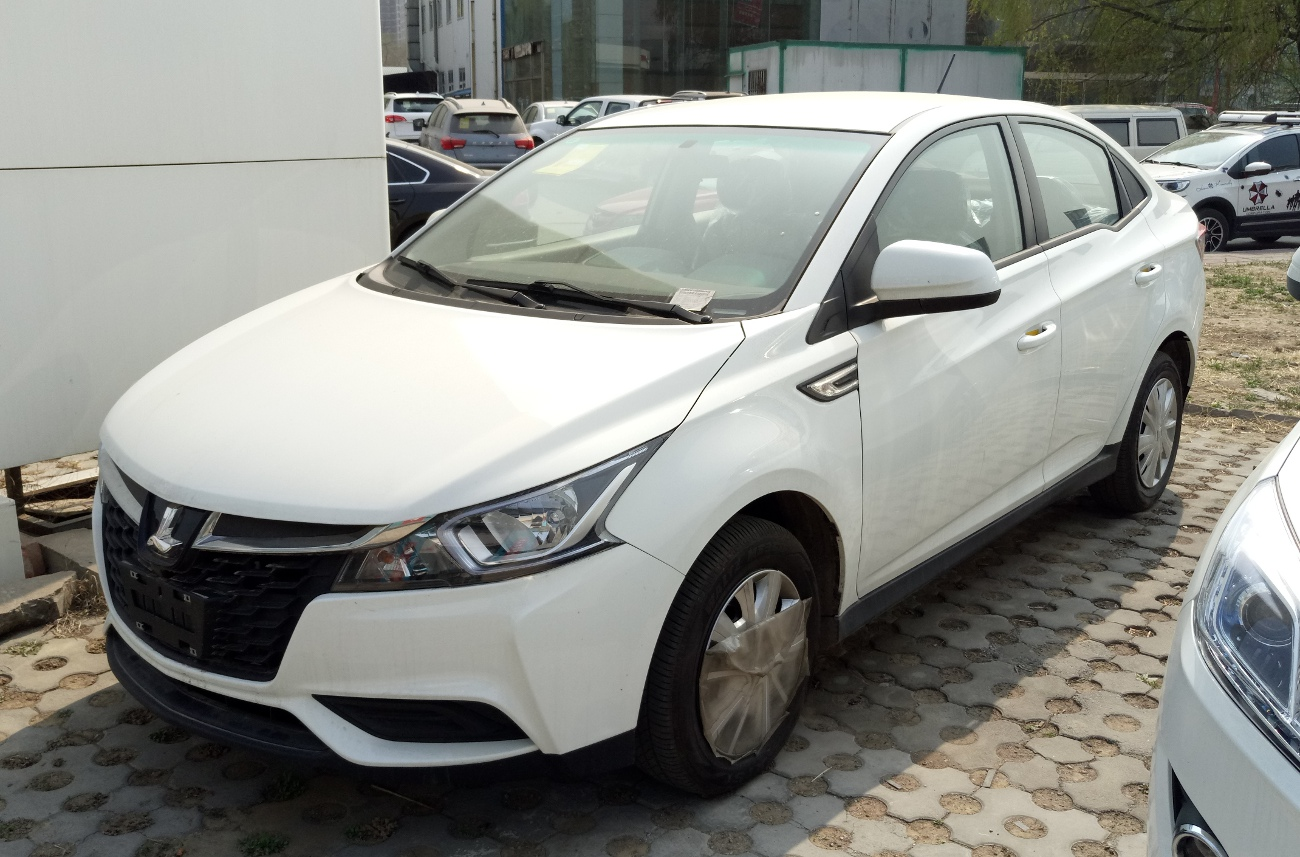
Luxgen S3

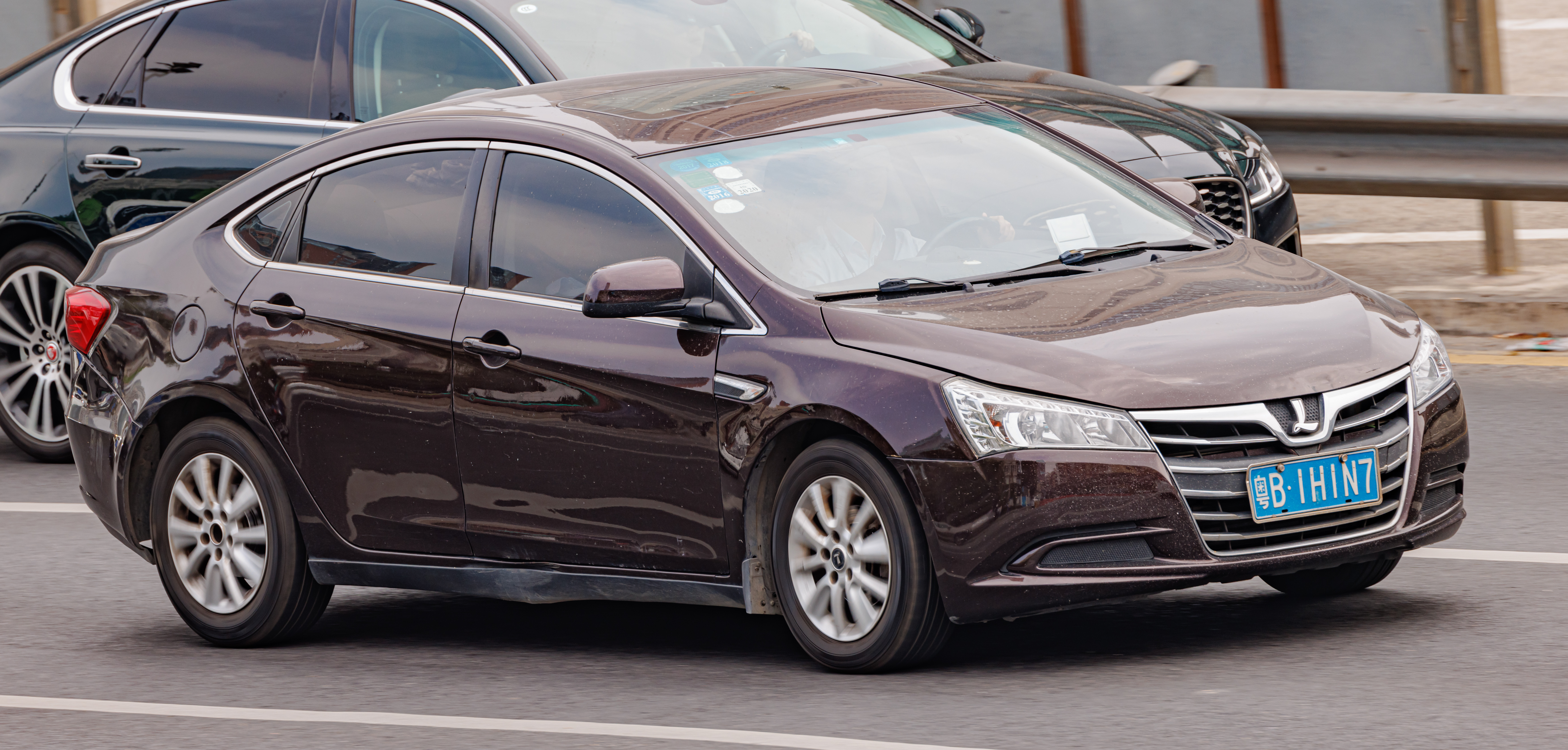
Luxgen S5

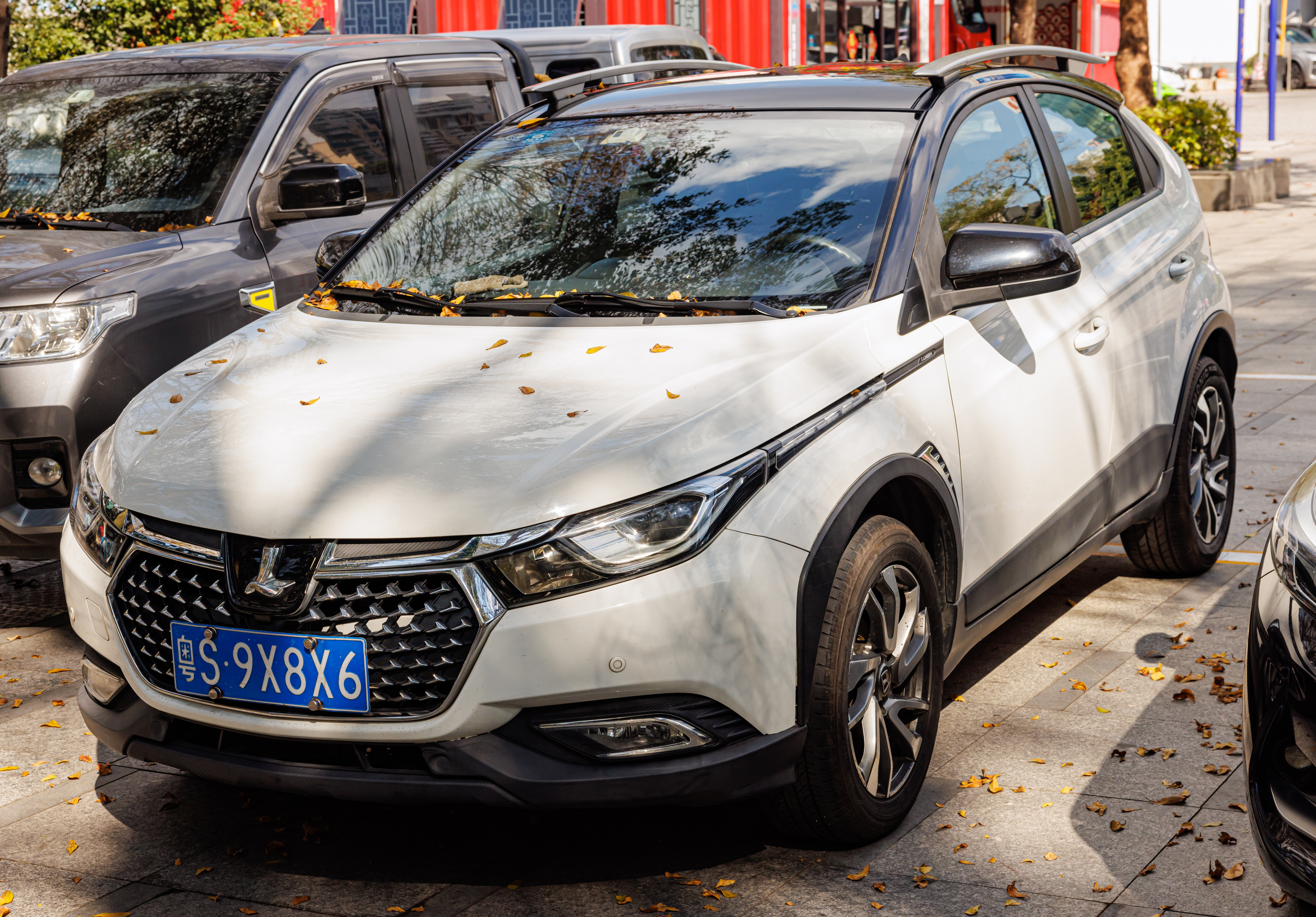
Luxgen U5

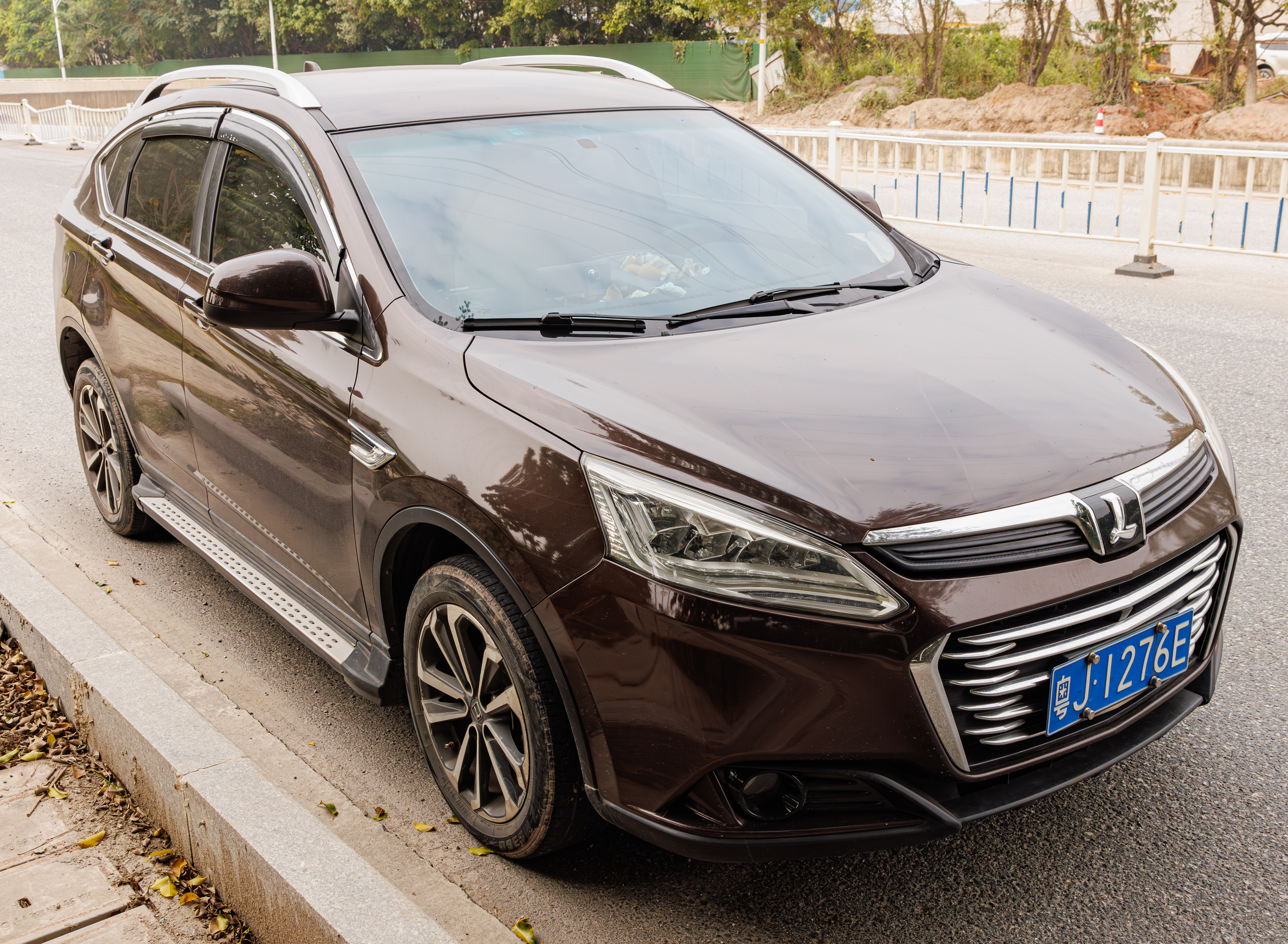
Luxgen U6

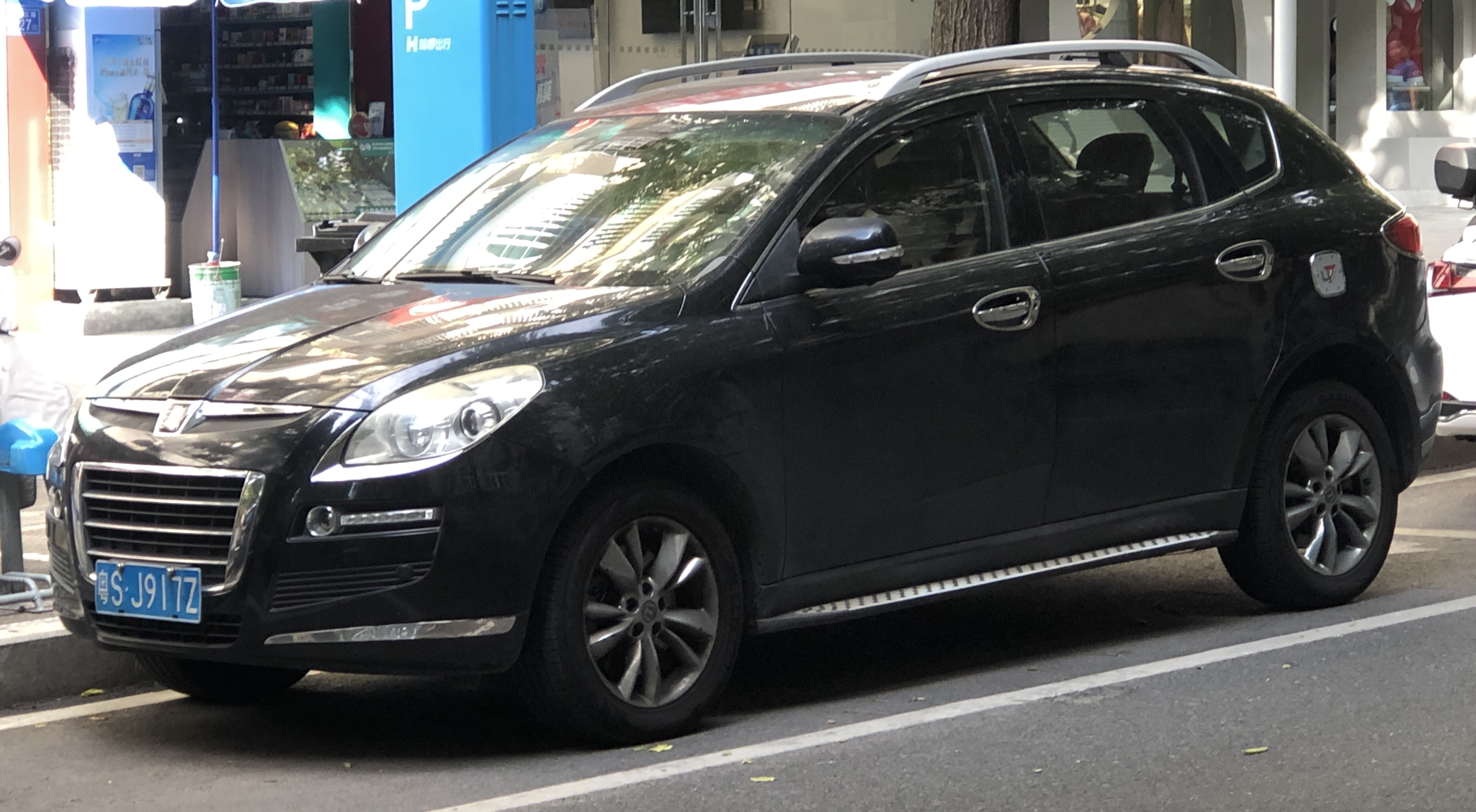
Luxgen U7

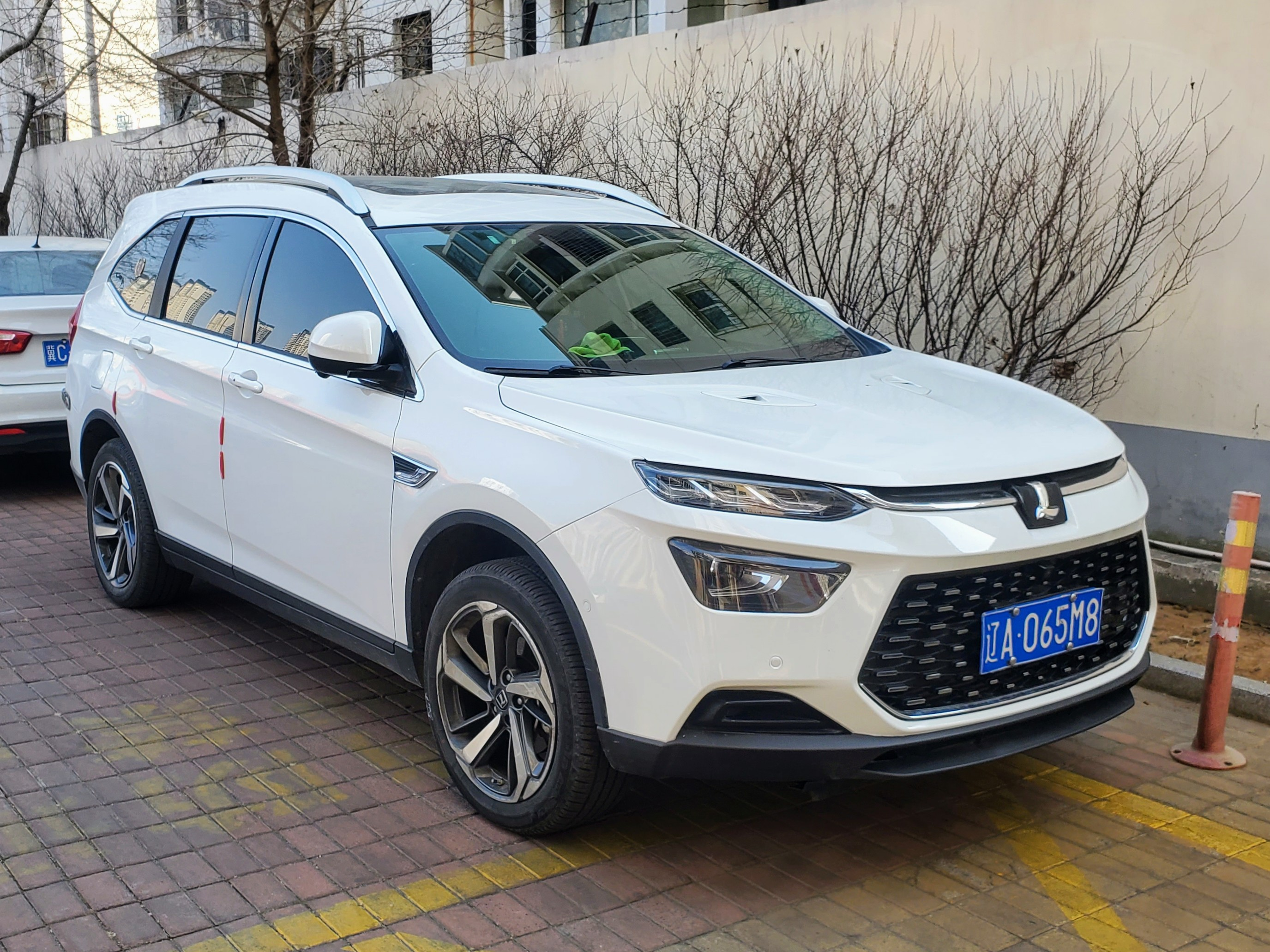
Luxgen URX

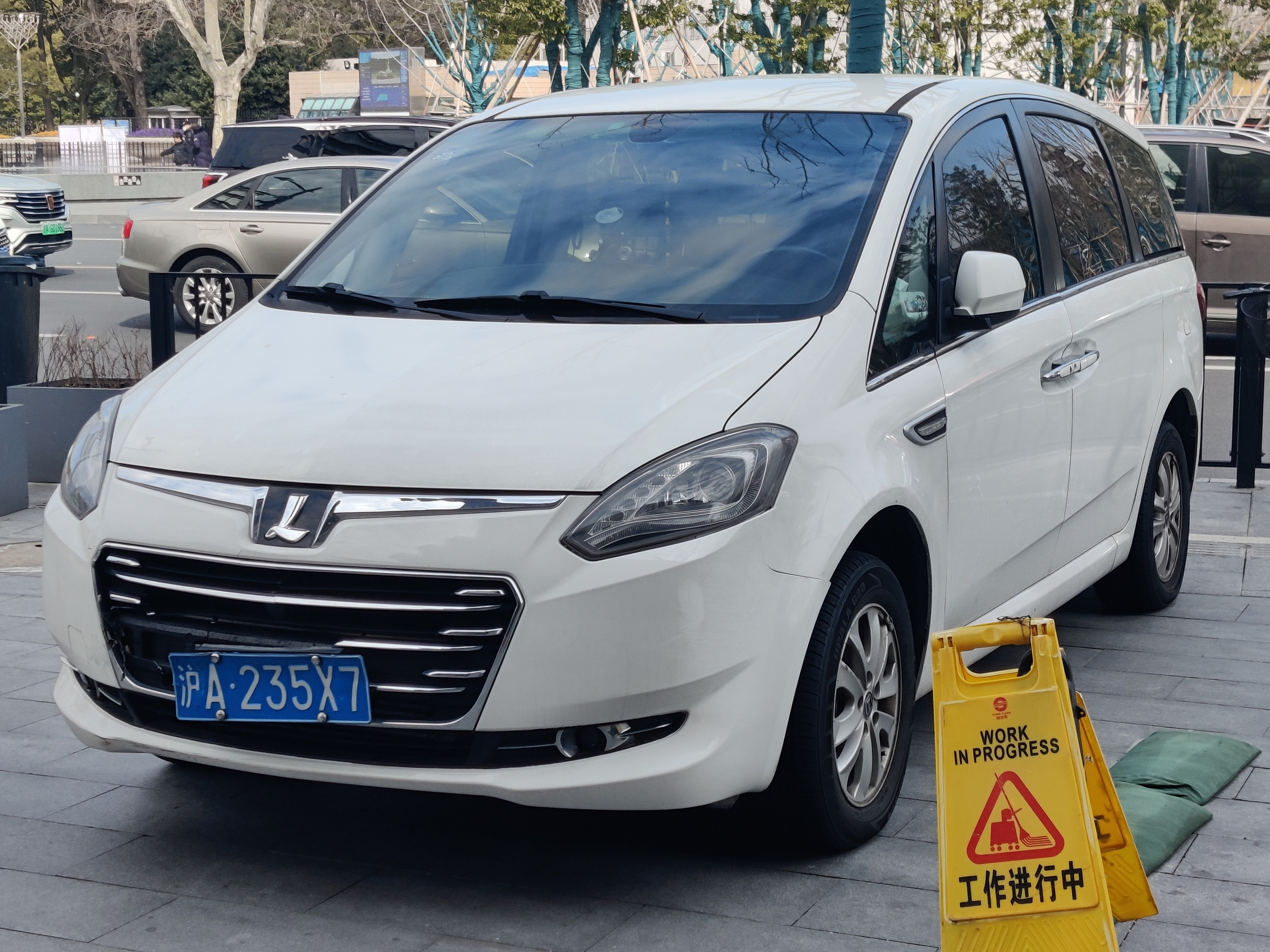
Luxgen M7

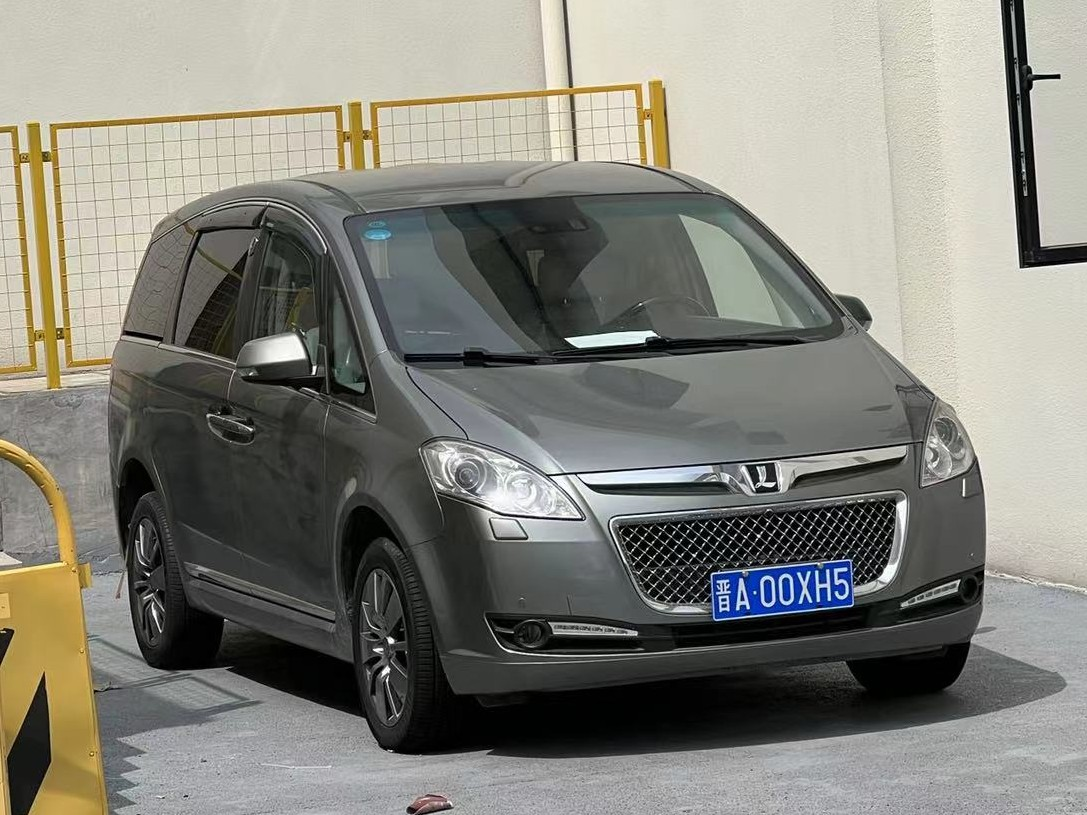
Luxgen Master CEO MPV

== Operations ==
Dongfeng Yulon operates manufacturing facilities in the Linjiang Industrial Zone of Xiaoshan which have an annual production capacity of 120,000 vehicles and 120,000 engines.

== Sales ==
Dongfeng Yulon sold a total of 31,106 vehicles in 2011, the majority of which were Luxgen 7 models.

A total of 31,270 Luxgen brand vehicles were sold in China in 2013, making it the 49th largest-selling car brand in the country in that year.
