= Luxgen =

Taiwanese automotive manufacturer

Luxgen Motor Co., Ltd.
- Native name: 納智捷汽車股份有限公司
- Type: Private
- Industry: Automotive
- Founded: 2009; 17 years ago
- Founder: Kenneth Yen
- Headquarters: Miaoli County, Taiwan
- Area served: Worldwide
- Key people: K.C. Hu and Jack Wu (general manager)
- Products: Cars
- Total assets: $9.8 billion New Taiwan dollars
- Parent: Foxtron
- Website: www.luxgen-motor.com.tw

Luxgen
- Traditional Chinese: 納智捷
- Simplified Chinese: 纳智捷
Transcriptions
Standard Mandarin
- Hanyu Pinyin: Nàzhìjié
- IPA: [nâ.ʈʂî.tɕjě]
Southern Min
- Hokkien POJ: La̍p-tì-chia̍p
- Tâi-lô: La̍p-tì-tsia̍p

Luxgen Motor Co., Ltd. is a Taiwanese automotive manufacturer headquartered in Miaoli County. It is a wholly owned subsidiary of Foxtron.

Luxgen was founded in 2009, and the company's motto is "Think Ahead". From 2010 to 2020, its vehicles were manufactured and marketed in China by Dongfeng Yulon. Currently, Luxgen products are primarily manufactured and marketed in Taiwan.

== History ==
Prior logo, used from 2009 to 2022

Luxgen made its first overseas sale in Oman in 2010, as part of a plan to focus on the Middle East, Latin America, Central America and South America, Russia, China and Southeast Asia car markets. Further sales were made in the Dominican Republic.

In 2011, Luxgen topped the J.D. Power Customer Service Index (CSI) in Taiwan among locally produced car brands. Luxgen repeated as the highest-scoring marque among Mass Market Brands in the J.D. Power 2018 Taiwan CSI Study.

Luxgen entered the Russian market in 2013 followed by the Iranian market in 2017.

In 2020, Luxgen announced that the manufacturer would exit from China market due to low sales. In response to the transformation of electric vehicles in 2022, LUXGEN will change its brand identity and change the L logo to the English letters LUXGEN, The brand slogan was also changed to "Pure Highlights, Infinite Possibilities."

In December 2025, Foxtron Vehicle Technologies agreed to acquire Luxgen for NT$787,600,000 pending Fair Trade Commission approval. The deal is expected to close in the first quarter of 2026. Luxgen will no longer launch new models and will instead operate a dedicated sales system for the Foxtron brand.

== Products ==
=== Current products ===
==== URX ====
The Luxgen URX debuted in 2019. The URX is a midsize crossover based on the U6's platform. It could be the first Luxgen vehicle exported to Europe.

==== n7 ====
The Luxgen n7 debuted in 2023. The n7 is a battery-electric SUV for which preorders opened in September 2022.

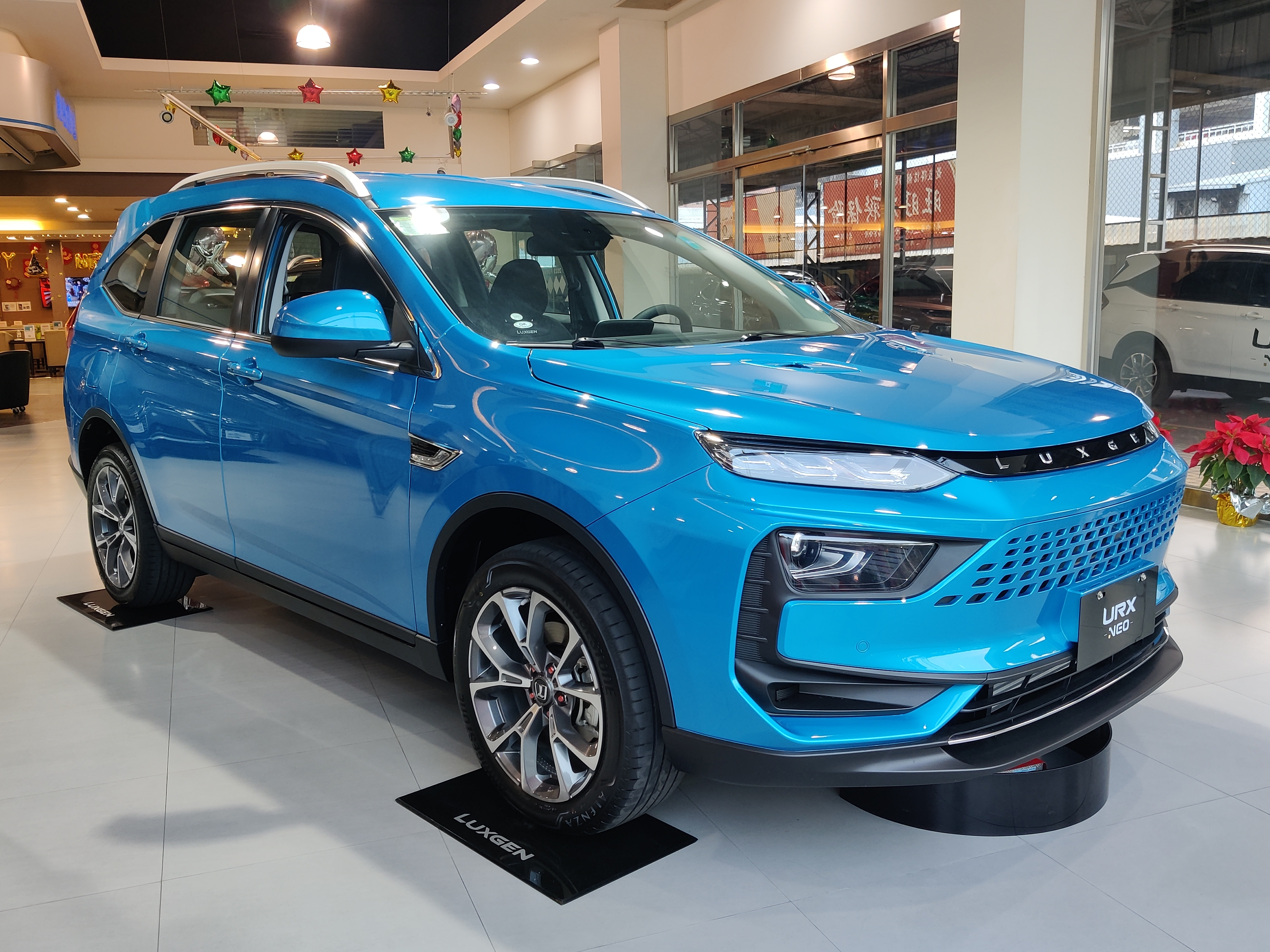
URX (2019–present); Neo model shown

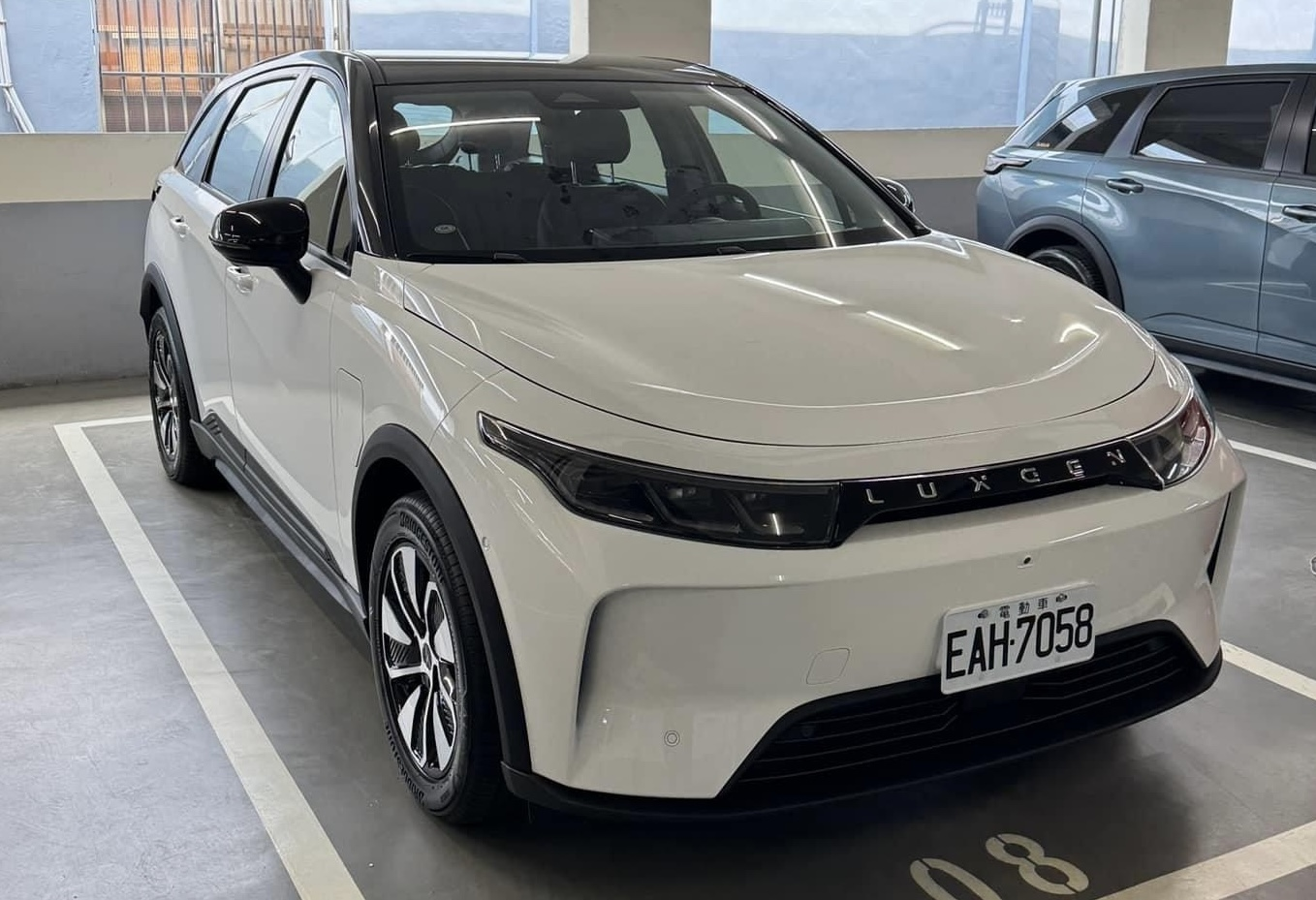
n7 (2023–present)

=== Discontinued products ===
==== M7 ====
Luxgen's first production model was the Luxgen7 MPV minivan. It was officially shown to the public for the first time on August 19, 2009, and went on sale in Taiwan on September 19, 2009. The vehicle was based on the Renault Espace III. In Taiwan, by March 2010, more Luxgen7 MPVs had sold than the entire Hyundai lineup.

In December 2009, luxury CEO (built-to-order) and electric EV+ models were unveiled publicly at the Dubai Motor Show; the EV+ was developed in collaboration with AC Propulsion. When the styling was updated in 2014, the MPV was renamed to Luxgen M7.

Luxgen M7 was discontinued in 2021.

==== U7 ====
The Luxgen U7 is Luxgen's second product. It was unveiled as the Luxgen7 SUV at the Dubai Motor Show in December 2009 and released on June 4, 2010. The name was changed to U7 during the facelift. Both the M7 and U7 are powered by a 2.2 L turbocharged 4-cylinder petrol engine developed in collaboration with Le Moteur Moderne, using turbos manufactured by Garrett, and meeting Euro4 emissions standards.

Luxgen U7 was discontinued in 2020.

==== U6 ====
The Luxgen U6 compact crossover debuted in 2013, using the same platform and 1.8 and 2.0 L VVT turbo engines as the S5. The U6 GT and U6 GT225 models are equipped with the smaller and larger engine, respectively. The U6 was facelifted in 2017, adding a 1.6 L engine from PSA Group.

Luxgen U6 was discontinued in 2026.

==== S5 ====
Originally launched as the Luxgen5 Sedan, the compact sedan was unveiled in November 2011 at the Taipei Auto Show and then officially launched in the second quarter of 2012, followed by a China release in July 2013. It was the first wholly self-developed Taiwanese car. The Neora EV concept, shown at Auto Shanghai in April 2011, was adapted for production as the Luxgen5, equipped with conventional 1.8 L and 2.0 L turbocharged petrol engines with variable valve timing. After a design refresh in 2015, the sedan was renamed to Luxgen S5.

Luxgen S5 was discontinued in 2020.

==== V7 ====
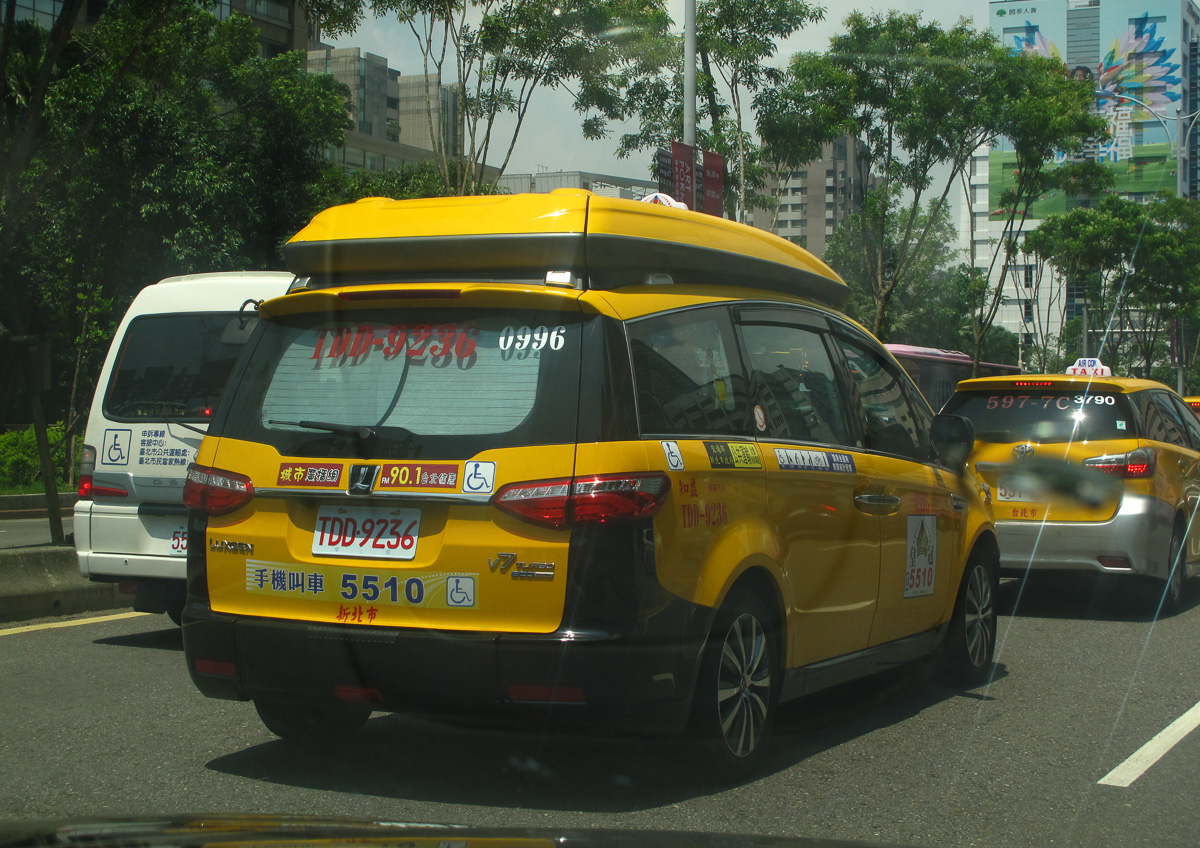
Luxgen V7 Taxi rear view

The Luxgen V7 is basically a wheelchair accessible version of the M7 which has a lower extended tailgate and extended roof. The V7 was later revealed in production version during the 2016 Taipei Auto Show.

Luxgen V7 was discontinued in 2021.

==== S3 ====
Luxgen S3 is a sub-compact sedan which was released in 2016.

Luxgen S3 was discontinued in 2020.

==== U5 ====
The Luxgen U5 debuted in Q3, 2017. The U5 is a subcompact crossover based on the S3's platform.

Luxgen U5 was discontinued in 2020.

==== MBU ====
The Luxgen MBU debuted in 2019. The MBU is a concept performance crossover on a new platform that is intended for future vehicles.

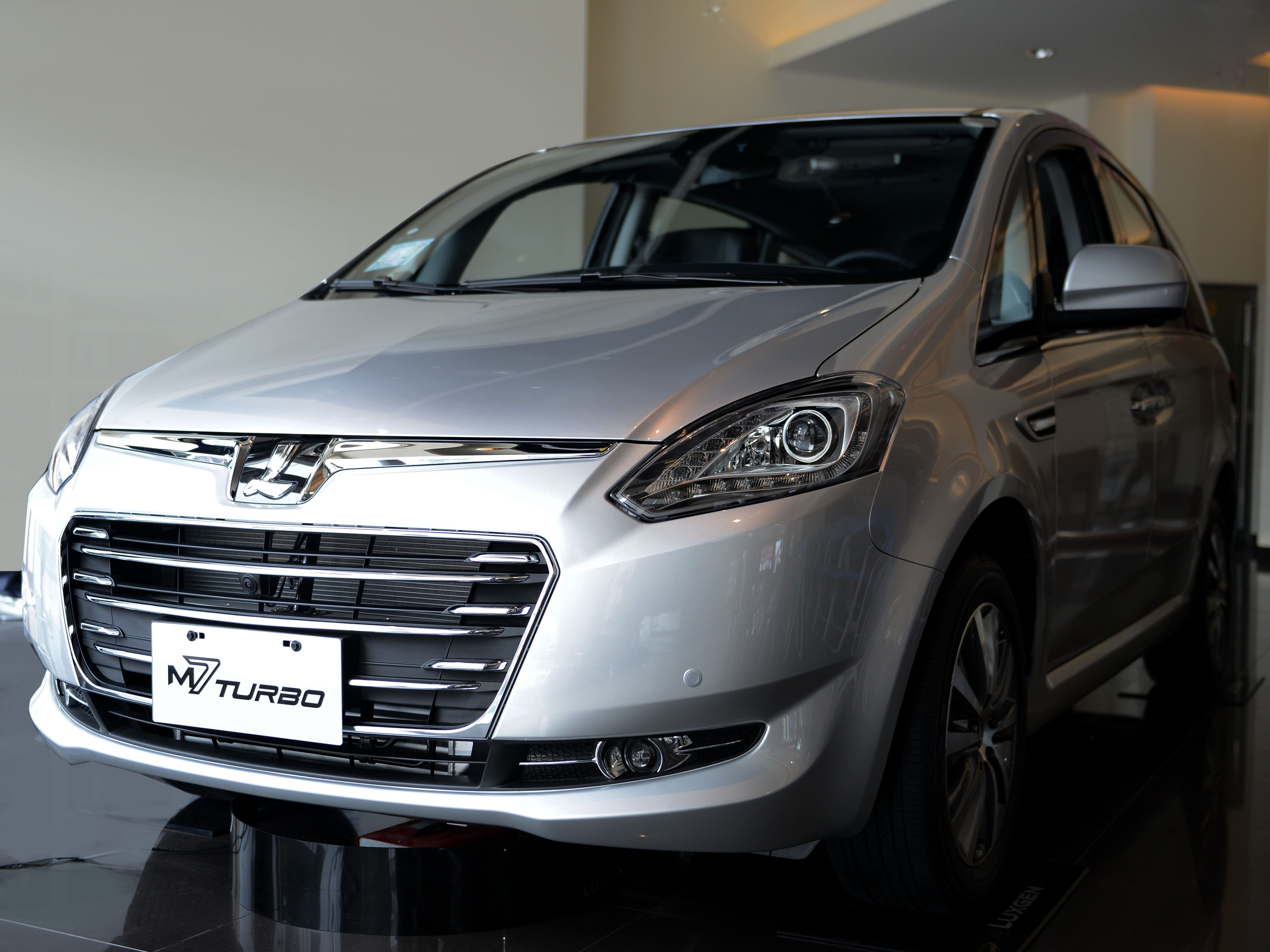
M7 (2009–2021); EcoHyper model shown

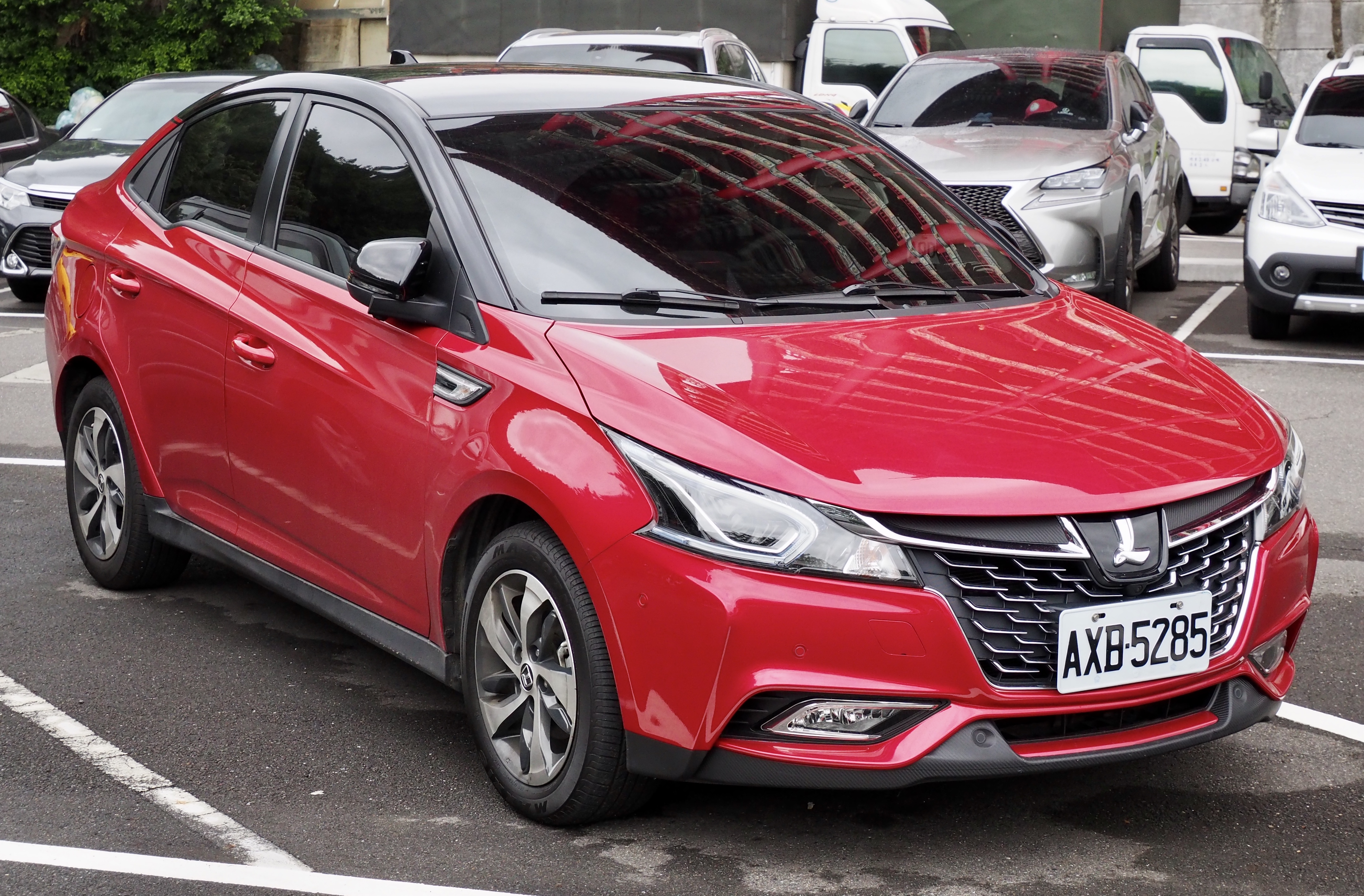
S3 (2016–2020)

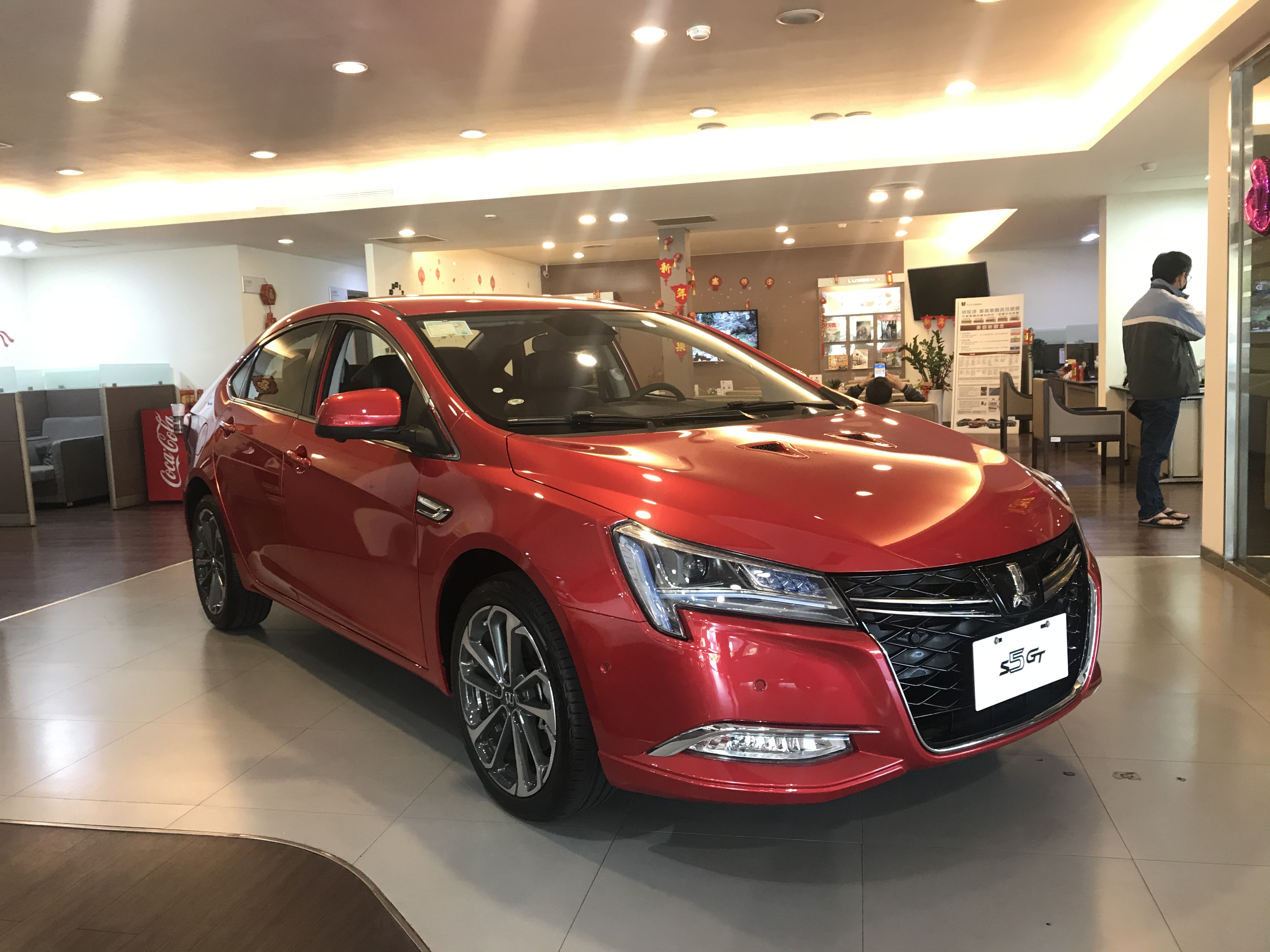
S5 (2012–2020); GT model shown

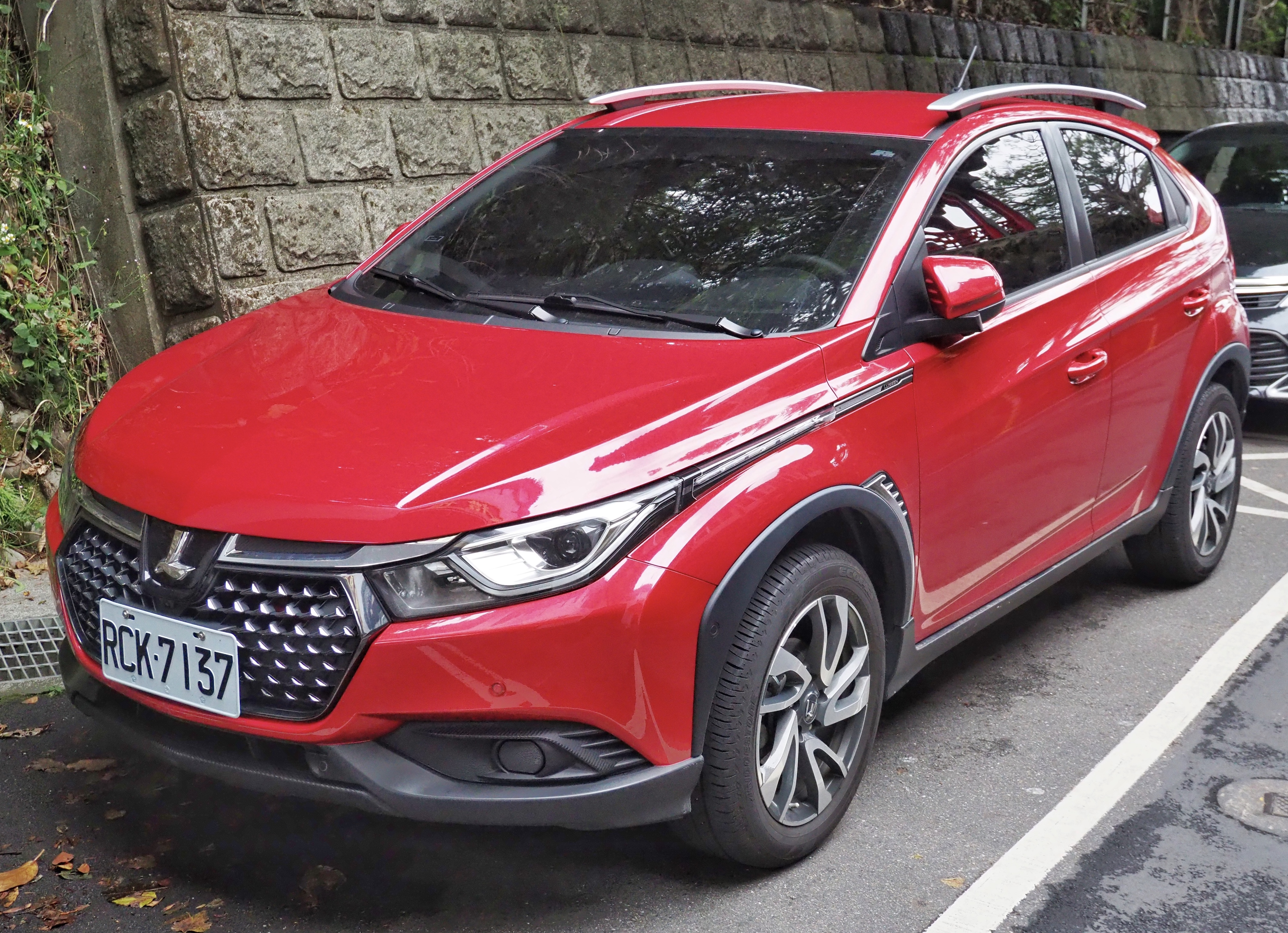
U5 (2016–2020)

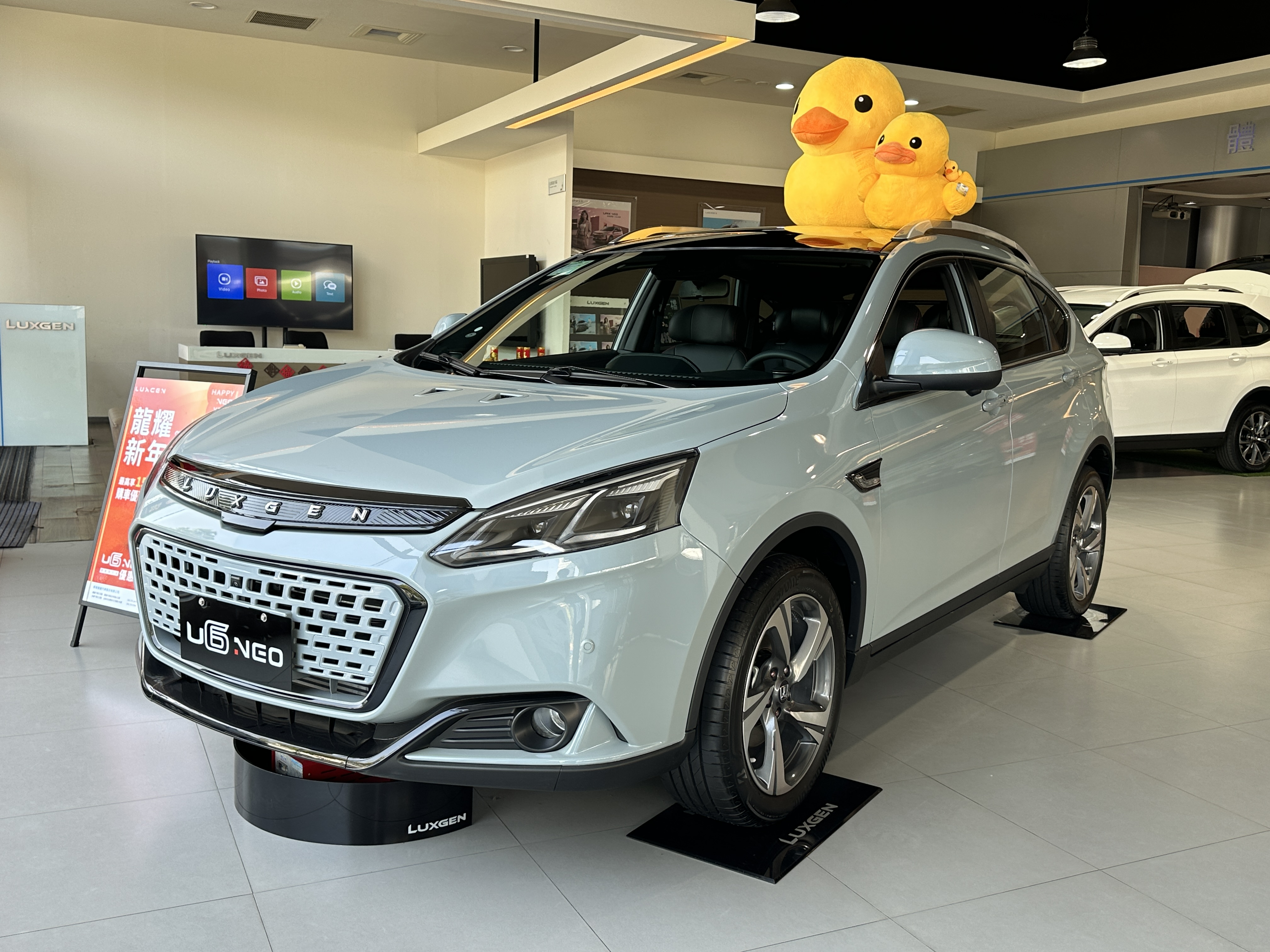
U6 (2013–2026); Neo model shown

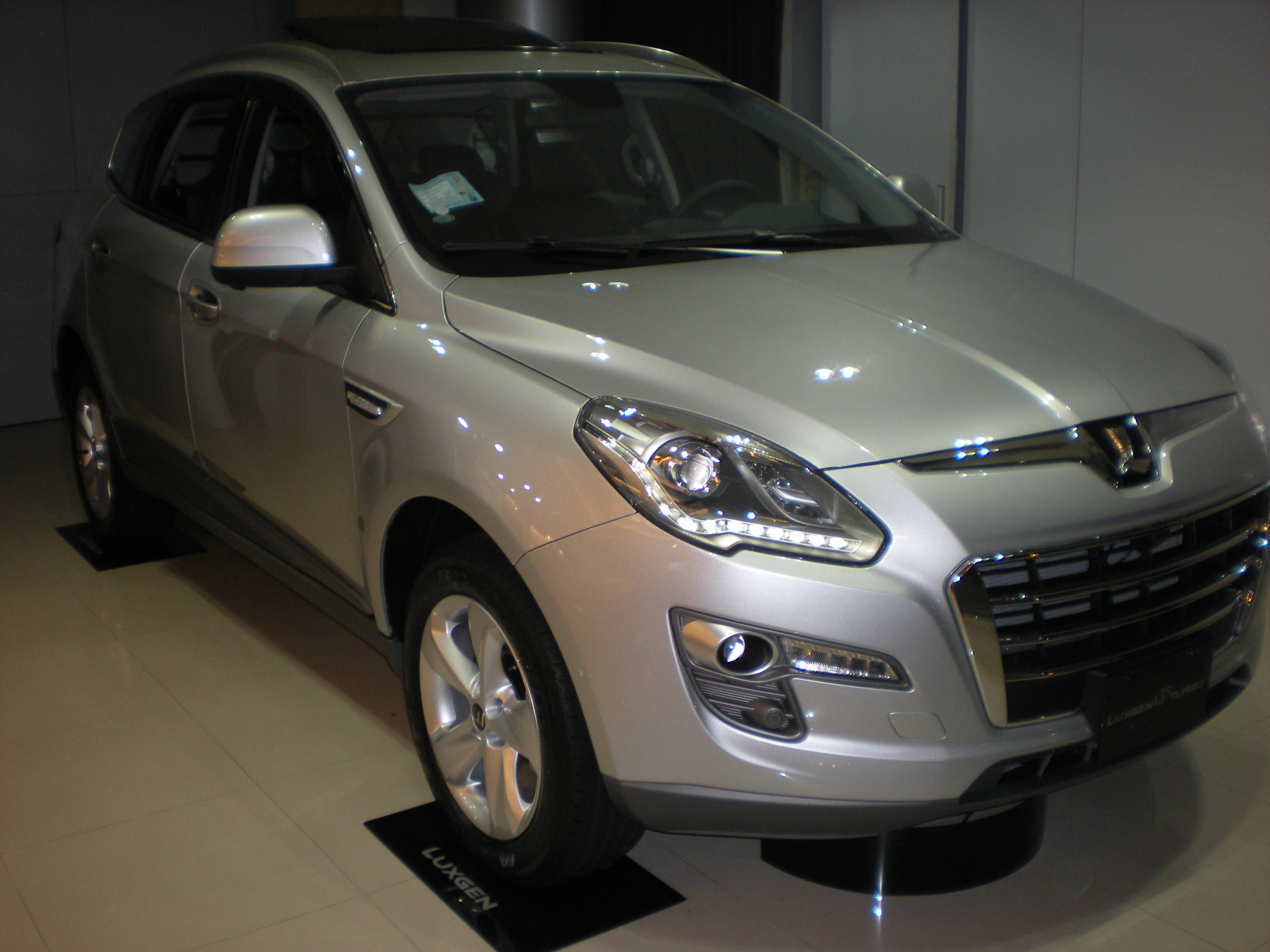
U7 (2010–2020)

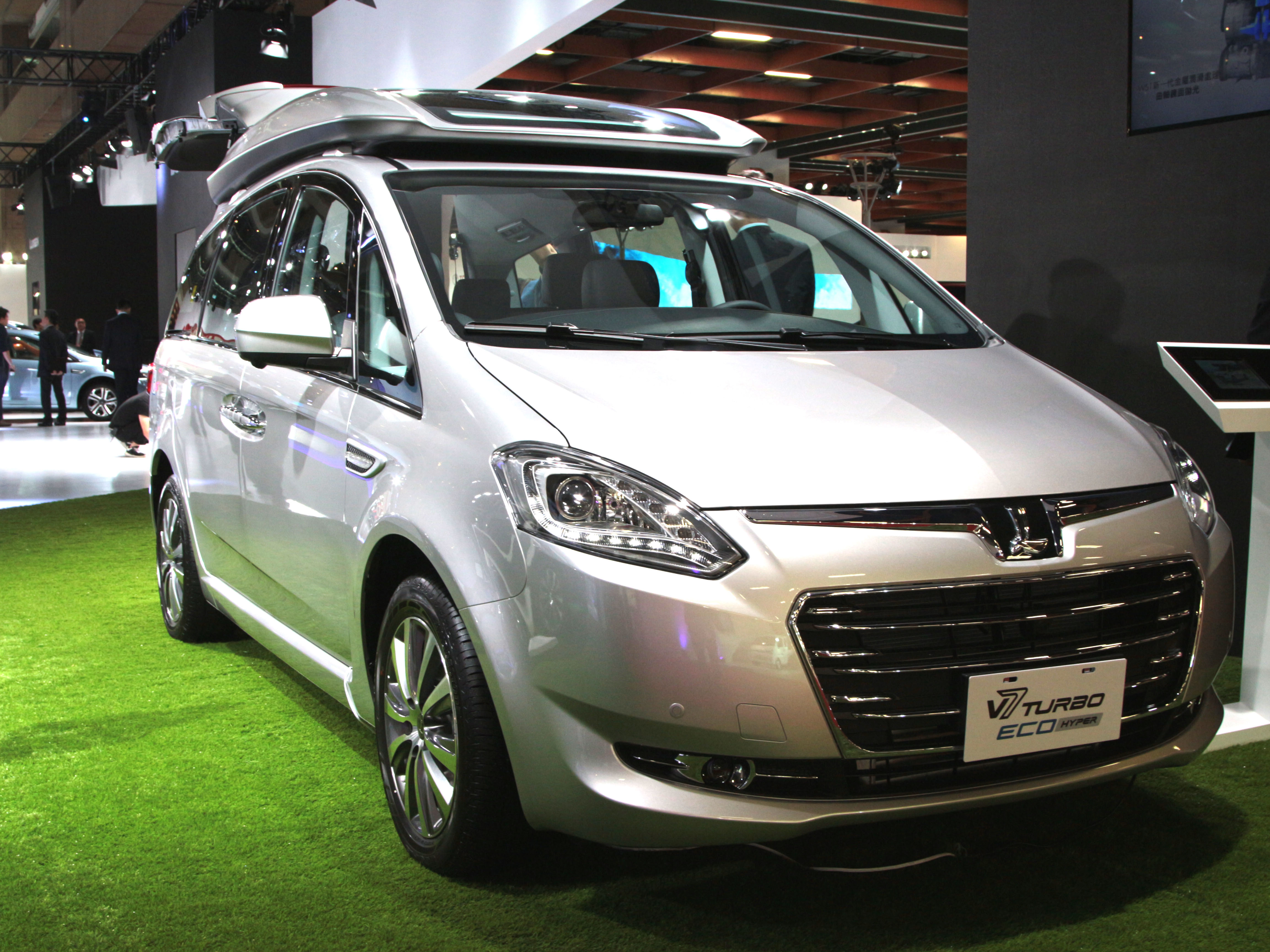
V7 (2016–2021); EcoHyper model shown

== See also ==
- List of companies of Taiwan
- List of Taiwanese automakers
- Dongfeng Yulon (Luxgen Mainland China)
