= Luxgen U6 =

Compact crossover SUV

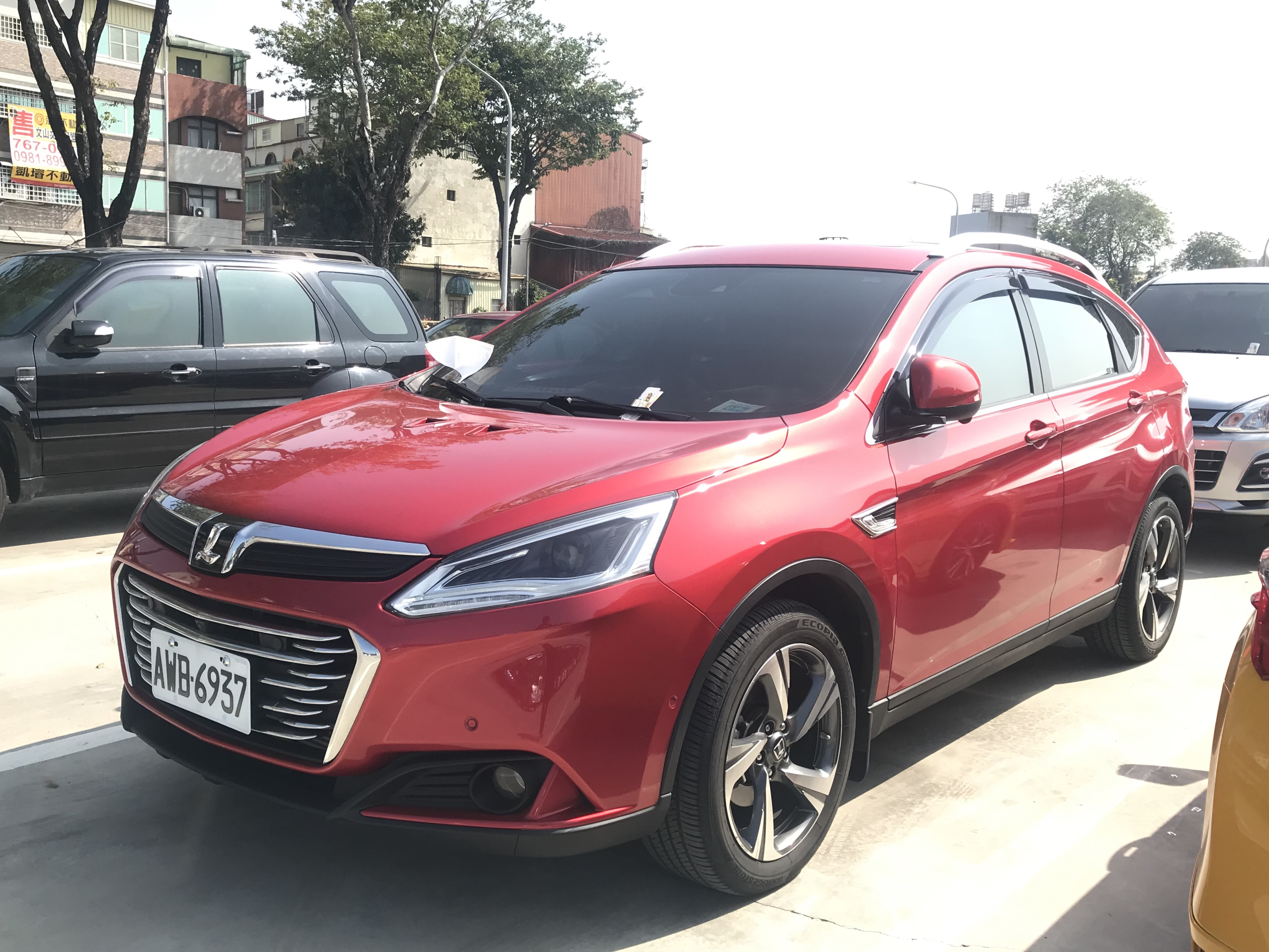

Overview
- Manufacturer: Luxgen
- Also called: Luxgen U6 Turbo Eco Hyper (2013–2017); Luxgen U6 GT/GT220 (2017–2023); Luxgen U6 Neo (2023–2026)
- Production: 2013–2026
- Assembly: Taiwan: Miaoli; China: Hangzhou (Dongfeng Yulon, until 2020); Iran: Mamqan (Azvico)
- Designer: James C. Shyr

Body and chassis
- Class: Compact crossover SUV (C)
- Body style: 5-door SUV
- Layout: Front-engine, front-wheel-drive
- Related: Luxgen S5

Powertrain
- Engine: Petrol: 1.8 L G18TG I4 turbo; 2.0 L G20TG I4 turbo
- Power output: U6 Turbo: 128 kW (171 hp; 173 PS) (1.8 L); 142 kW (191 hp; 194 PS) (2.0 L); U6 GT: 149 kW (199 hp; 202 PS) (1.8 L); U6 GT220: 163 kW (219 hp; 222 PS) (1.8 L)
- Transmission: 5-speed manual; 5-speed automatic; 6-speed manumatic

Dimensions
- Wheelbase: 2,720 mm (107.1 in)
- Length: 4,625 mm (182.1 in)
- Width: 1,825 mm (71.9 in)
- Height: 1,645 mm (64.8 in)
- Curb weight: 1,472–1,505 kg (3,245–3,318 lb)

The Luxgen U6 is a compact crossover SUV produced by the Taiwanese car company Luxgen. The compact crossover was also produced and sold in China by the Dongfeng-Yulon joint venture.

== Overview ==
The Luxgen U6 was developed under Yulon's R&D center, HAITEC. Based on the same platform as the Luxgen S5 compact car, the U6 crossover is Luxgen's first compact crossover positioned under the U7 7 seater SUV. A minor update was done in 2014, featuring the new Eco Hyper engine technology. The U6 Turbo is available with two turbocharged engines: 1.8 turbo with 171 hp (128 kW) and 27.1 kg⋅m (266 N⋅m; 196 lbf⋅ft) or a 2.0 turbo with 191 hp (142 kW) and 28 kg⋅m (275 N⋅m; 203 lbf⋅ft). Gearbox: 5-speed automatic or 5-speed manual for the 1.8 turbo, and a 6-speed automatic for the 2.0 turbo.

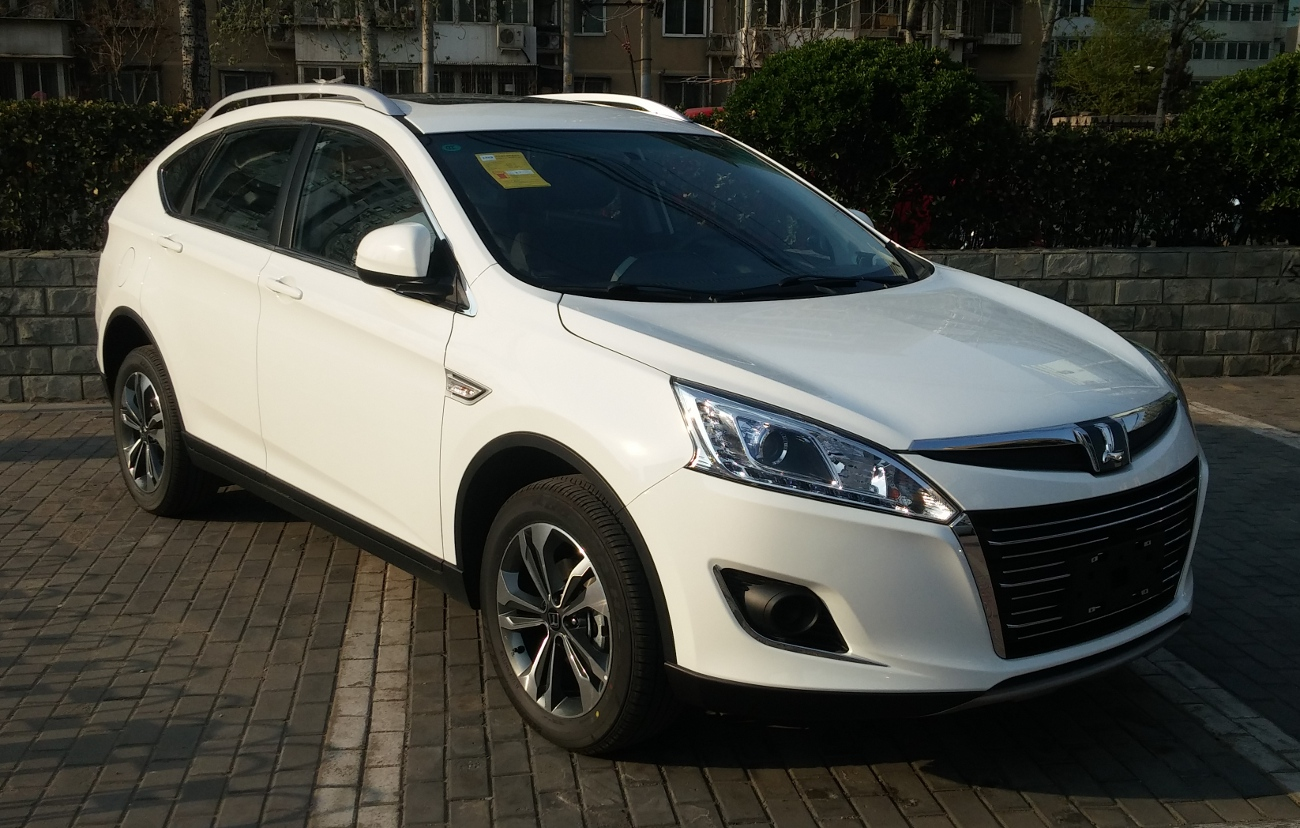
Luxgen U6 front

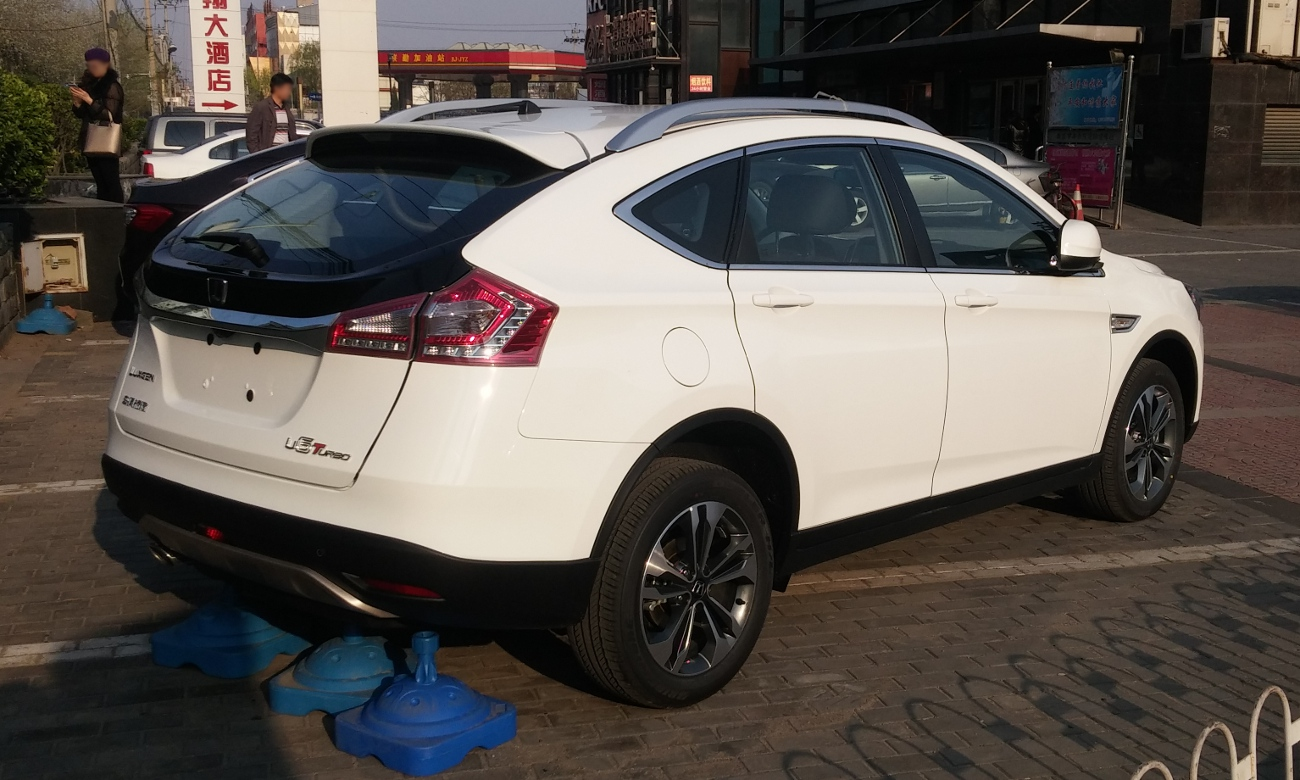
Luxgen U6 rear

=== U6 GT ===
A facelift model was launched in 2017 Shanghai Motor Show called the U6 GT. It went on sale in November, 2017 in Taiwan. The U6 GT is powered by a 1.8L petrol engine with 202 PS (149 kW; 199 hp) and 32.6 kg⋅m (320 N⋅m; 236 lbf⋅ft), and the U6 GT220 is powered by a 1.8L petrol engine with 222 PS (163 kW; 219 hp) and 33.6 kg⋅m (330 N⋅m; 243 lbf⋅ft), both with 6-speed manumatic transmissions. A U6 GT Rays Edition model was also offered with a set of Rays performance wheels developed by Luxgen and Rays exclusively for the U6 GT.

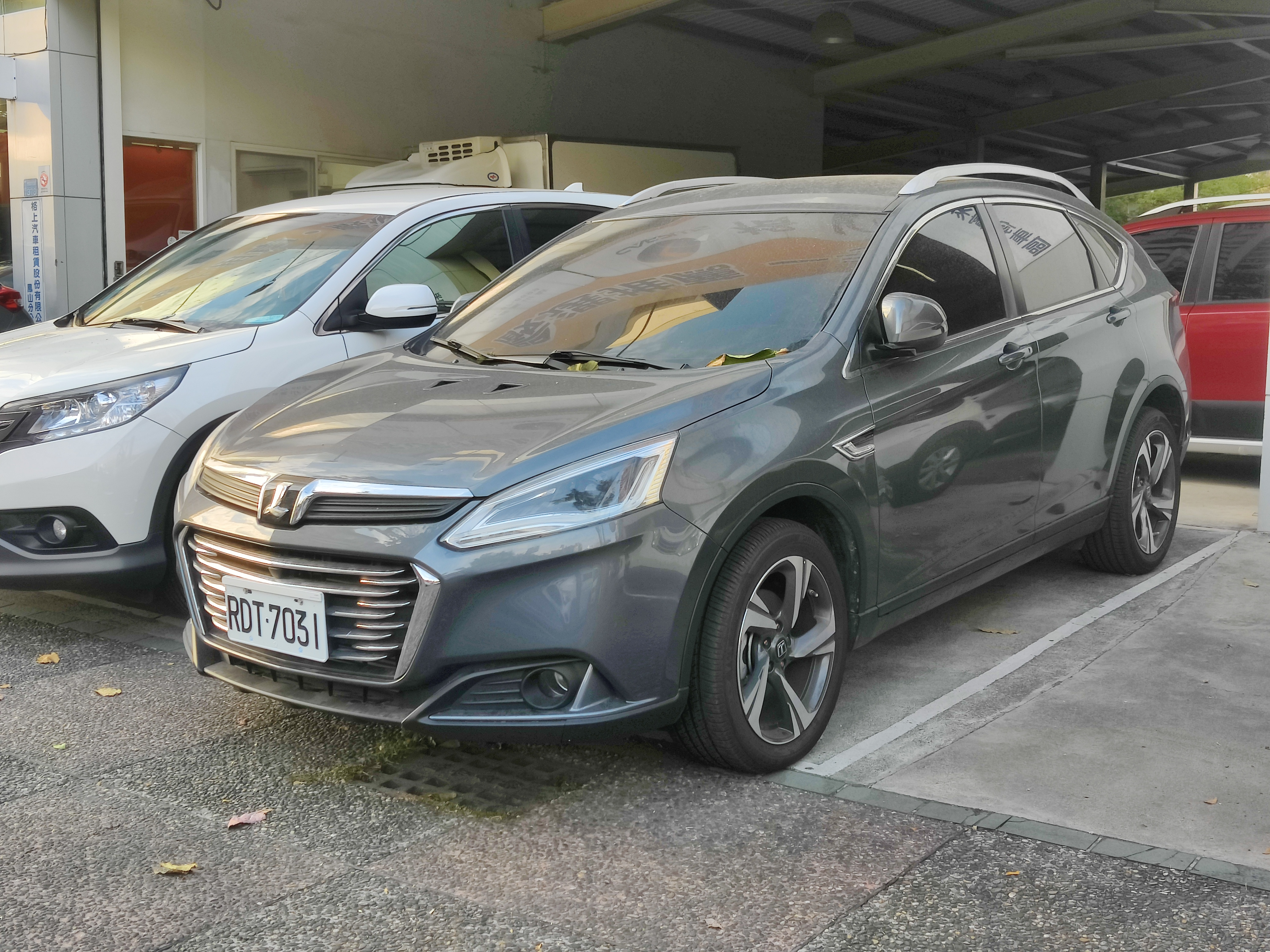
Luxgen U6 facelift (U6 GT) front

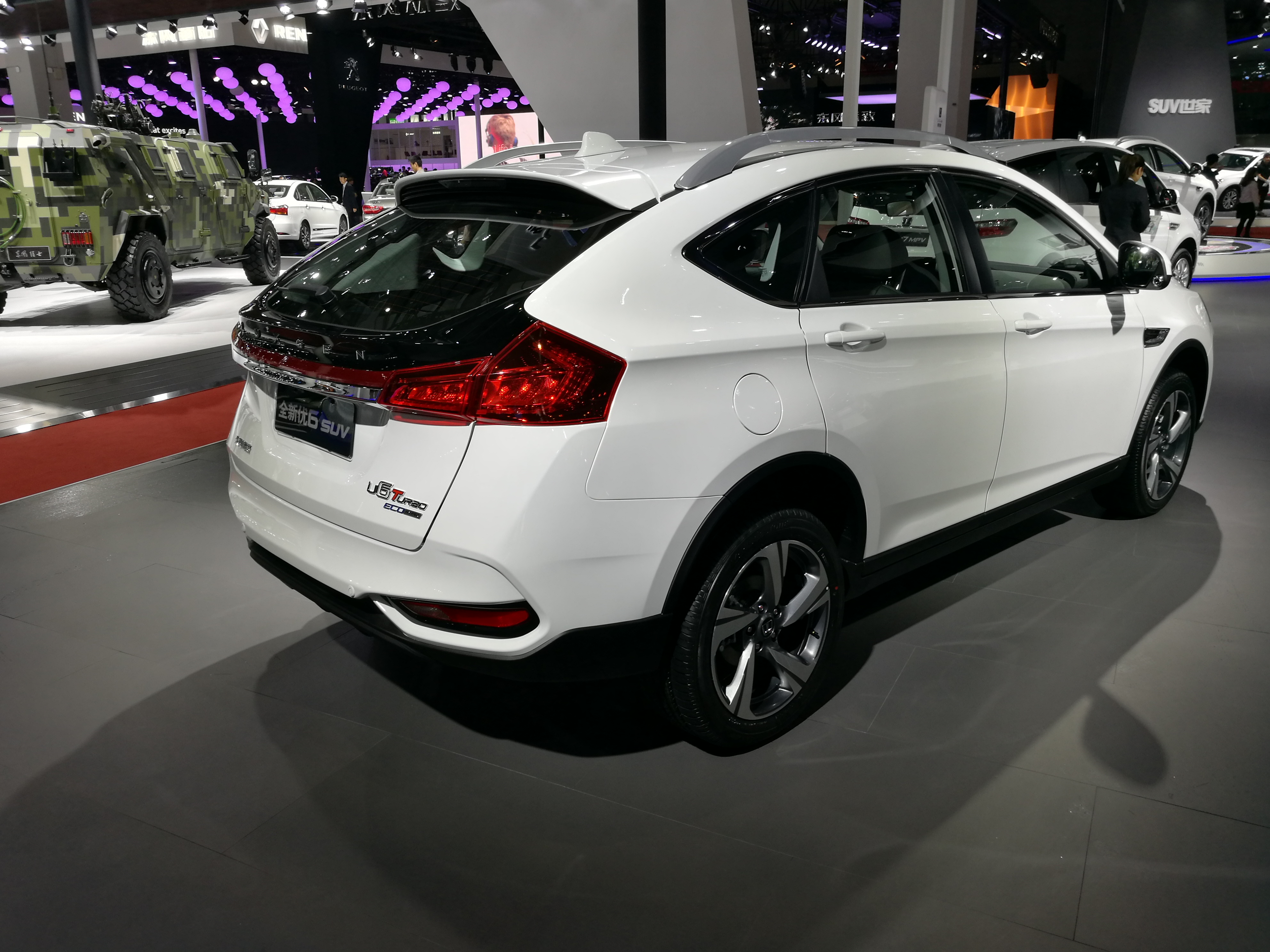
Luxgen U6 facelift (U6 GT) rear

=== U6 Neo ===
A second facelift was launched in 2023 called the U6 Neo. The powertrain of the U6 Neo remains to be the 1.8L petrol engine with 202 PS (149 kW; 199 hp) while featuring a restyled front end that fits with the URX Neo and the Luxgen N7 electric crossover SUV that comes after. A U6 Neo Rays Edition model was also offered with a limited run of 100. The Rays Edition features the same Rays performance wheels from the U6 GT Rays Edition.

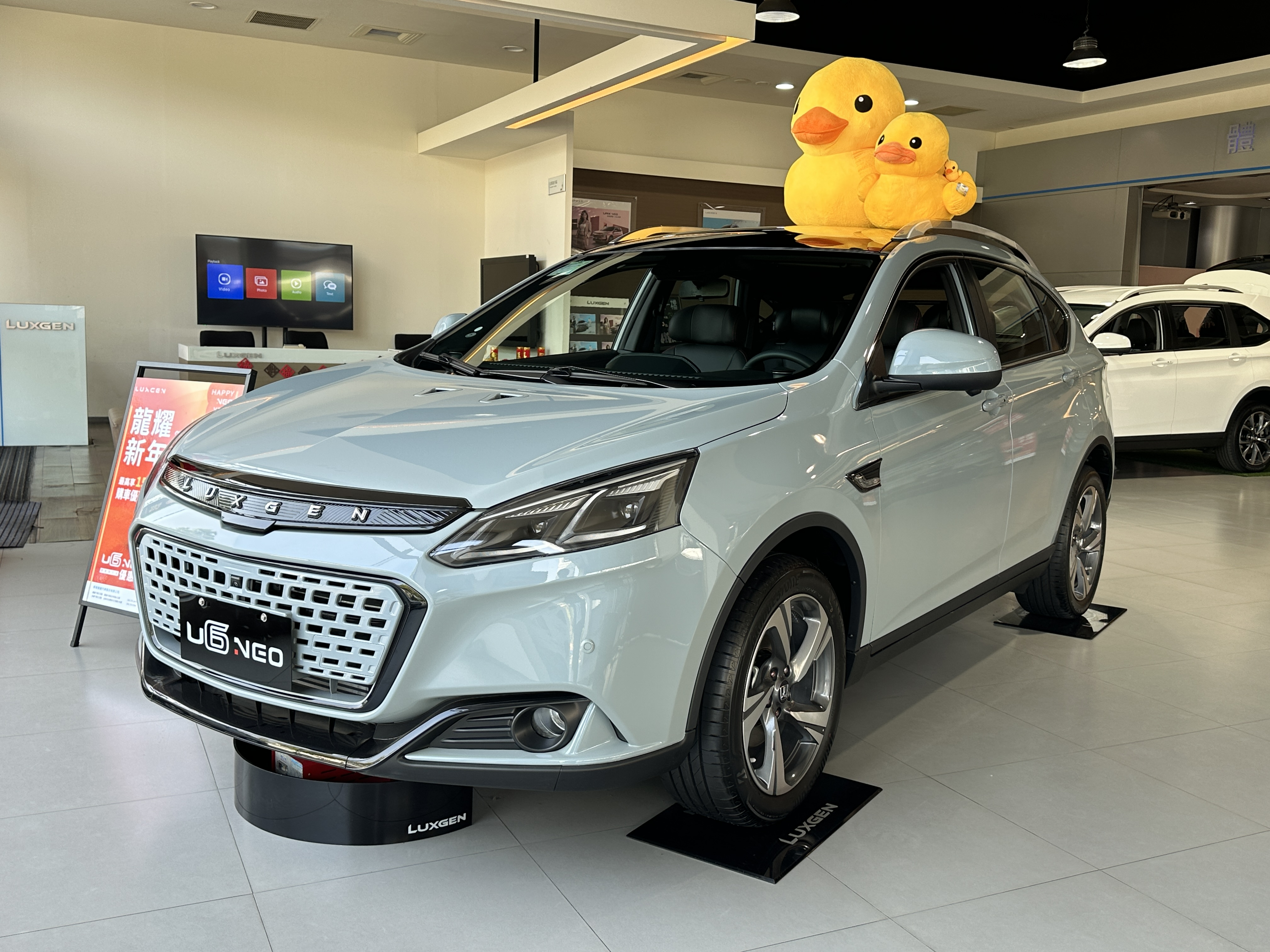
Luxgen U6 2023 facelift (U6 Neo) front

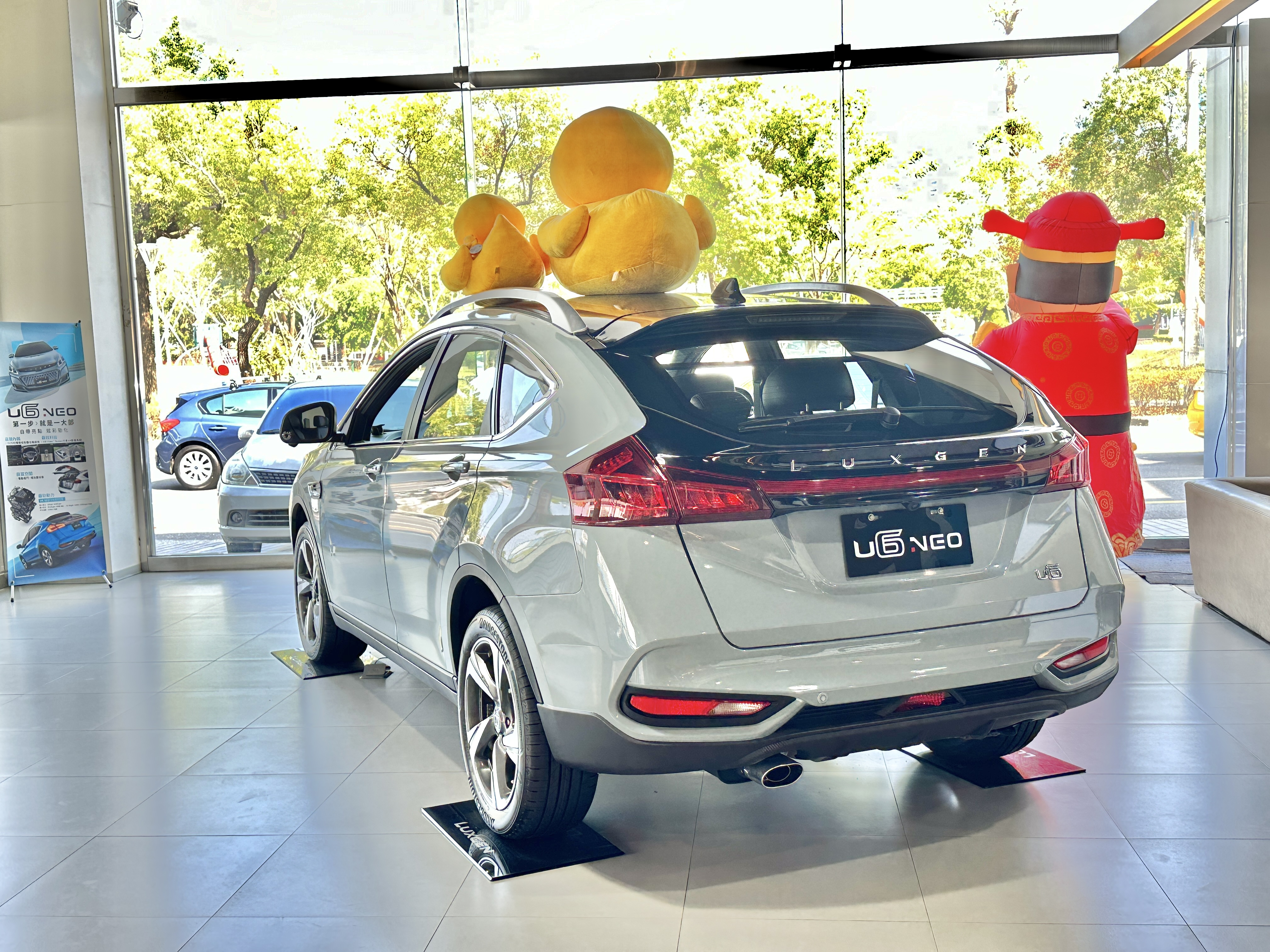
Luxgen U6 2023 facelift (U6 Neo) rear

In 2026, Luxgen confirmed that U6 end production.
