= Luxgen U7 =

Mid-size SUV

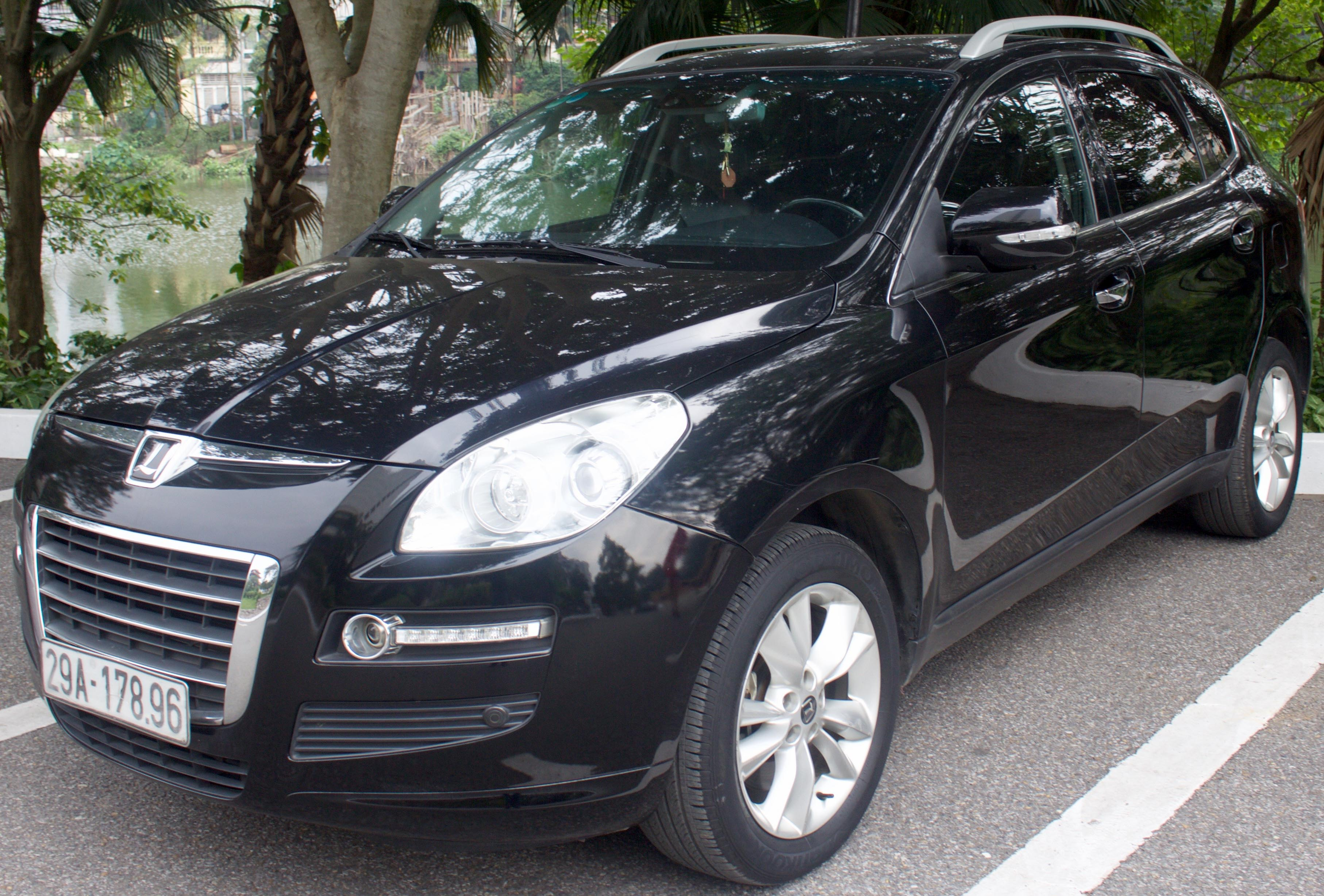

Overview
- Manufacturer: Luxgen
- Also called: Luxgen7 SUV (2010–2013)
- Production: 2010–2020
- Assembly: China: Hangzhou, Zhejiang (Dongfeng Yulon; until 2018); Taiwan: Miaoli County (Luxgen Motor Co., Ltd.); Russia: Cherkessk (Derways Automobile Company)

Body and chassis
- Class: Mid-size crossover SUV
- Body style: 5-door SUV
- Layout: Front-engine, front-wheel-drive, 4WD
- Platform: L7 platform
- Related: Luxgen M7

Powertrain
- Engine: 2.0L Luxgen G20TG Turbocharged I-4 (China); 2.2L Luxgen MEFI (G22TG) Turbocharged I-4
- Power output: 120 kW (163.2 PS; 160.9 hp) (2.0L); 131 kW (178.1 PS; 175.7 hp) (2.2L); 148 kW (201.2 PS; 198.5 hp) (ECO HYPER)
- Transmission: 5-speed manumatic 6-speed Aisin manumatic

Dimensions
- Length: 4,800 mm (189.0 in)
- Width: 1,930 mm (76.0 in)
- Height: 1,720–1,760 mm (67.7–69.3 in)
- Curb weight: 1,860–1,960 kg (4,100–4,320 lb)

The Luxgen U7, previously known as the Luxgen7 SUV, is a 7-seater mid-size crossover SUV produced by the Taiwanese manufacturer Luxgen. The car won two Taiwan Excellence Awards.

== Gallery ==
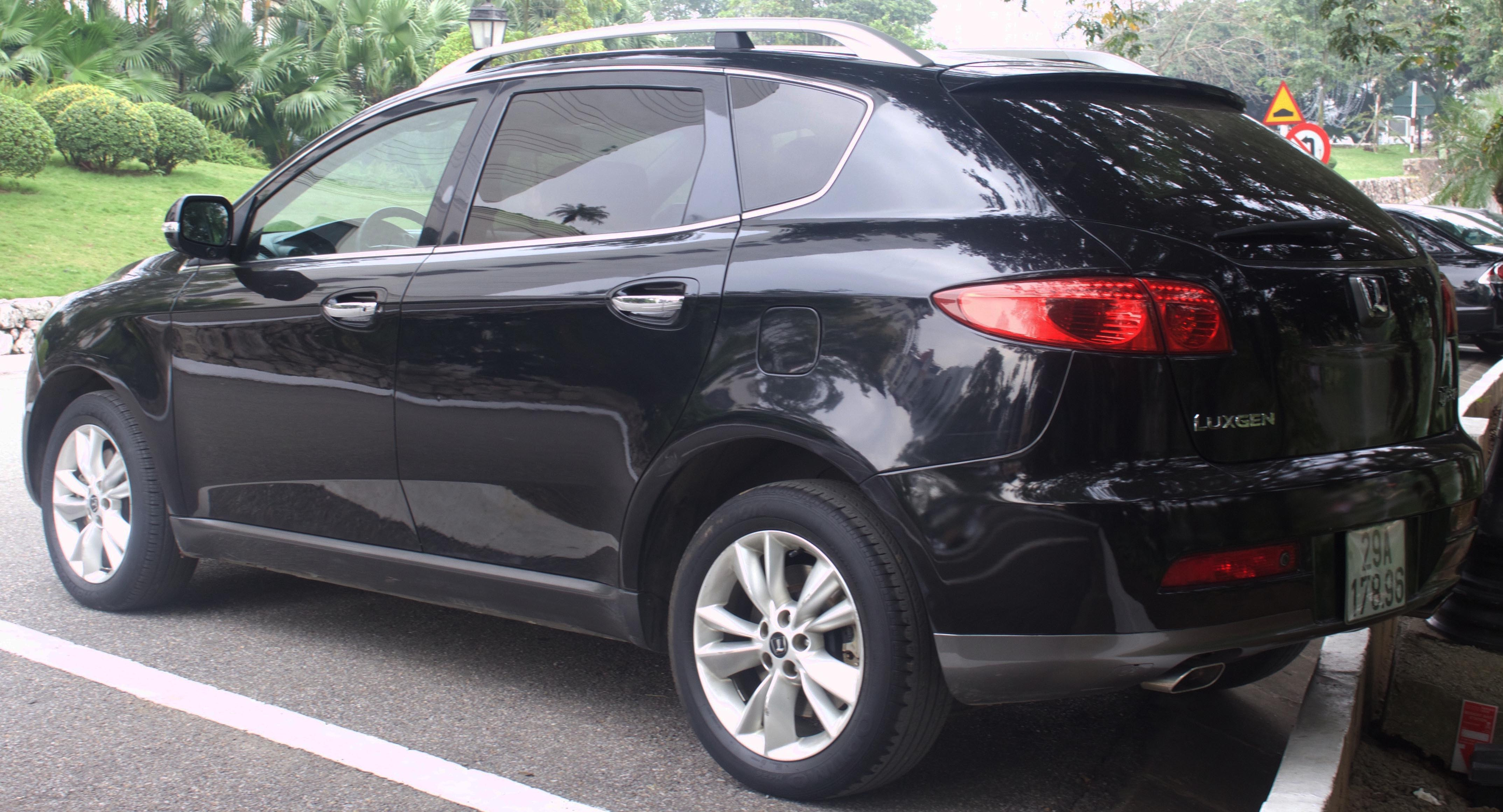
Luxgen7 SUV (pre-facelift)

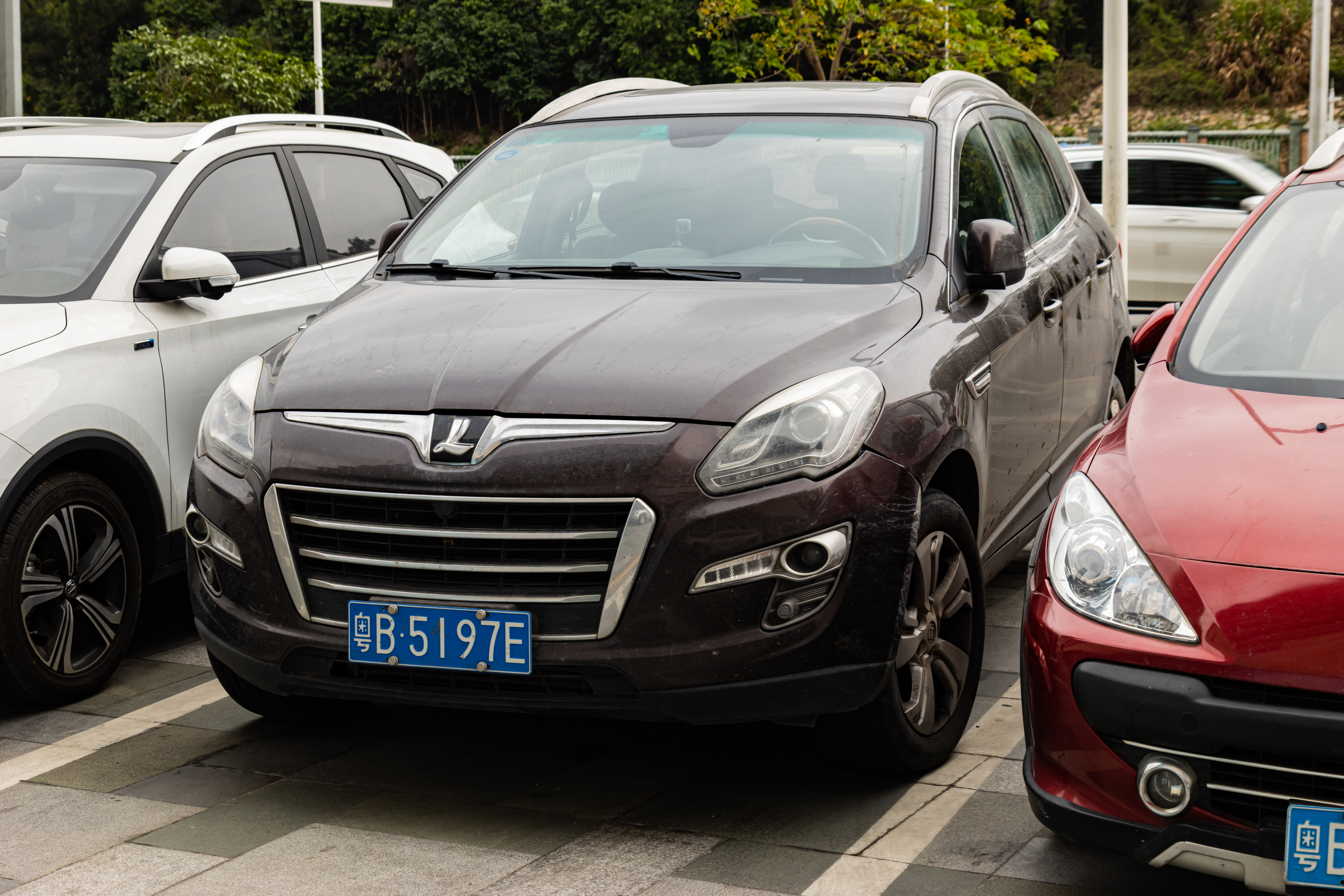
Luxgen U7 front view (facelift)

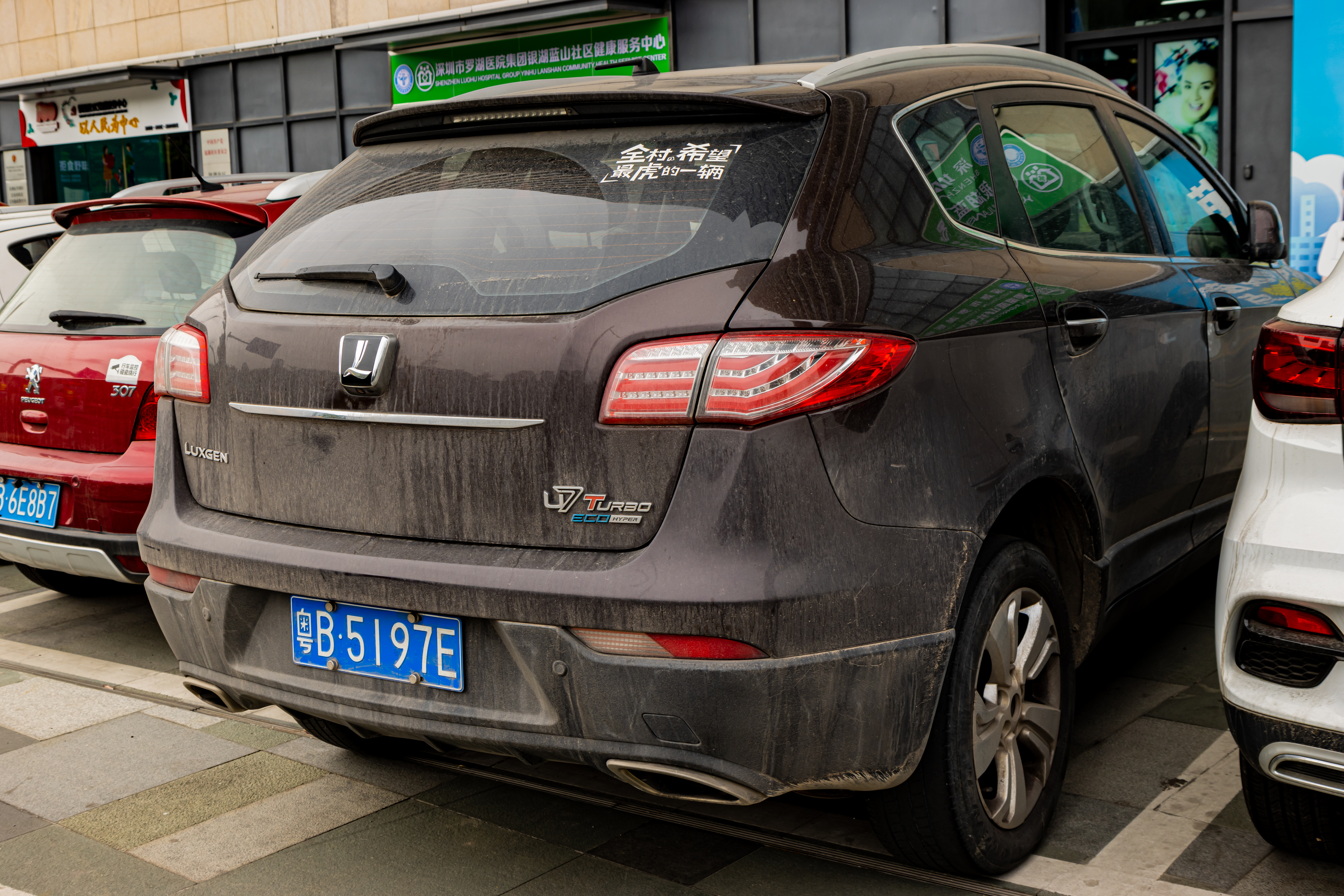
Luxgen U7 rear view (facelift)
