= Carbide chloride =

Class of chemical compounds

Carbide chlorides are mixed anion compounds containing chloride anions and anions consisting entirely of carbon. In these compounds there is no bond between chlorine and carbon. But there is a bond between a metal and carbon. Many of these compounds are cluster compounds, in which metal atoms encase a carbon core, with chlorine atoms surrounding the cluster. The chlorine may be shared between clusters to form polymers or layers. Most carbide chloride compounds contain rare earth elements. Some are known from group 4 elements. The hexatungsten carbon cluster can be oxidised and reduced, and so have different numbers of chlorine atoms included.

The carbide chlorides are a subset of the halide carbides, with related compounds including the carbide bromides, and carbide iodides. Cluster compounds similar to these carbides, may instead replace carbon with boron, hydrogen, nitrogen or phosphorus.

== List ==
formula	system	space group	unit cell	volume	density	comment	reference
Ca_{3}C_{3}Cl_{2}	orthorhombic	Cmcm	a=3.876, b=13.524, c=11.653		2.47	red	
Sc_{2}CCl_{2}		P3̅m1	a=3.39977 c=8.858		3.24	black	
Sc_{5}CCl_{8}	monoclinic	C12/m1	a=17.8 b=3.5259 c=12.052 β=130.11		2.99		
Sc_{7}C_{2}Cl_{10}	monoclinic	C12/m1	a=18.62 b=11.81 β=99.81		3.04	ruby red; moisture sensitive	
Ti_{6}CCl_{14}	orthorhombic	Cmce	a=12.4592 b=12.2458 c=10.9576		2.93	black	
YCCl		C12/m1	a=6.82 b=3.713 c=9.327 β=94.75		3.85		
Y_{2}C_{0.7}Cl_{2}		P3̅m1	a=3.7022 c=9.195		3.91	silvery grey	
Zr_{6}CCl_{14}	orthorhombic	Cmce	a=14.091 b=12.595 c=11.506		3.43	brown red	
KZr_{6}CCl_{15}	orthorhombic	Pnma	a=18.489 b=13.909 c=9.690 Z=4	2492		dark red; Zr_{6}C clusters	
Rb_{4}Zr_{6}CCl_{18}		C2/m	a=10.460 b=17.239 c=9.721 β=115.05 Z=2				
Rb[(Zr_{6}C)Cl_{15}]	orthorhombic	Pnma	a=18.484,b= 18.962,c=9.708 Z= 4	2505.4	3.12	dark red-brown	
Cs_{4}[Sc_{6}C]Cl_{13}	tetragonal	I4_{1}/amd	a = 15.405, c = 10.179 Z=4			green black	
Cs[(Zr_{6}C)Cl_{15}]	orthorhombic	Pnma	a = 18.513 b = 13.916 c = 9.6383 Z=4	2483.1		dark red	
La_{2}CCl		R3̅m	a=3.878 c=16.91		5.74	coppery red	
La_{2}C_{2}Cl	monoclinic	C12/c1	a=14.77 b=4.187 c=6.802 β=101.5		5.44	gold	
La_{3}C_{3}Cl_{2}	monoclinic	C12/c1	a=7.771 b=12.962 c=6.91 β=104.3		5.16	gold	
La_{4}C_{2}Cl_{5}	orthorhombic	Immm	a=3.92 b=7.945 c=19.297		4.67	black	
La_{4}C_{5}Cl_{2}	monoclinic	C12/m1	a=22.57 b=3.91 c=1.019 β=95.69		5.07	gold	
La_{5}C_{2}Cl_{9}	triclinic	P1̅	a=8.645 b=8.706 c=11.925 α=84.97° β=85.78° γ=61.31°		4.40	red	
La_{6}(C_{2})_{3}Cl_{4}	monoclinic	P2_{1}/c	a = 7.770, b = 12.962, c = 6.910 and β = 104.30° Z=2	674.4	5.158	gold; sheets of octahedra	
La_{8}C_{8}Cl_{5}	monoclinic	P12_{1}/c1	a=7.756 b=16.951 c=6.878 β=104.2		5.24	gold	
La_{8}(C_{2})_{5}Cl_{4}	monoclinic	C2/m	a = 22.570, b = 3.9300, c = 10.190 β = 95.69° Z=2	899.4	5.071	gold	
La_{11}C_{11}Cl_{7}	monoclinic	P12_{1}/c1	a=7.77 b=47.038 c=6.901 β=104.28		5.19	gold	
La_{14}C_{14}Cl_{9}	monoclinic	P1C1	a=7.775 b=2.9963 c=6.895 β=104.21		5.19	gold	
La_{20}C_{20}Cl_{13}	monoclinic	P12_{1}/c1	a=7.762 b=42.941 c=6.903 β=104.26		5.18	black	
La_{36}C_{36}Cl_{23}	monoclinic	P12_{1}/c1	a=7.764 b=77.055 c=6.897 β=104.26		5.18	grey	
K[La_{5}(C_{2})]Cl_{10}	monoclinic	P2_{1}/c	a=8.5632, b=15.074, 17.115 β=119.74 Z=4	1918.3	3.85	light red	
Ce_{2}C_{2}Cl	monoclinic	C12/c1	a=14.573, b=4.129, c=6.696, β=101.37		5.71	gold	
Ce_{2}(C_{2})_{2}Cl	monoclinic	C2/c	a = 14.573, b = 4.129, c = 6.696, β = 101.37 °				
Ce_{3}CCl_{5}	monoclinic	C12/c1	a=13.899, b=8.71, c=15.765, β=98.22		4.29	orange	
Ce_{4}CCl_{8}	monoclinic	P1C1	a=13.538, b=10.487, c=22.845, β=126.31		4.35	black	
Ce_{5}C_{2}Cl_{9}	triclinic	P1̅	a=8.57, b=8.627, c=11.869, α=84.8, β=85.5, γ=61.29			red	
Ce_{6}Cl_{10}C_{2}	monoclinic	C12/c1	a= 13.899,b= 8.710,c= 15.765,β= 98.22° Z=4	1888.9			
Ce_{8}C_{8}Cl_{5}	monoclinic	P12_{1}/c1	a=7.669, b=16.784, c=6.798, β=104.05		5.46	gold	
Ce_{18}(C_{2})_{9}Cl_{11}	triclinic	P1̅	a = 6.771, b = 7.657, c = 18.98,α = 88.90 °, β = 80.32 °, γ = 76.09 °				
Ce_{26}(C_{2})_{13}Cl_{16}	monoclinic	P2_{1}/c	a = 7.664, b = 54.25, c = 6.796, β = 103.98 °				
K[Ce_{5}(C_{2})]Cl_{10}	monoclinic	P2_{1}/c	a=8.4739, b=15.017, c=1639 β=119.76 Z=4	1871.2	3.97	red	
Pr_{3}CCl_{5}	monoclinic	C12/c1	a=13.867 b=8.638 c=15.69 β=97.67		4.37	yellow	
Pr_{4}C_{2}Cl_{5}	orthorhombic	Immm	a=3.848 b=7.759 c=17.01		5.00	black	
Pr_{5}C_{2}Cl_{9}	triclinic	P1̅	a=8.526 b=8.592 c=11.821 α=84.77 β=85.42 γ=61.26		4.61	brown red	
Pr_{6}C_{2}Cl_{10}	monoclinic	C2/c	a = 13.687, b = 8.638, c = 15.690, β = 97.67°			yellow to green	
Pr_{8}C_{8}Cl_{5}	monoclinic	C12_{1}/c1	a=7.617 b=16.689 c=6.769 β=103.94		5.57	gold	
Pr_{11}C_{11}Cl_{7}	monoclinic	P12_{1}/c1	a=7.612 b=6.127 c=6.761 β=103.92		5.56	gold	
Pr_{14}C_{14}Cl_{9}	monoclinic	P1c1	a=7.611 b=29.392 c=6.764 β=103.9		5.56	gold	
K{Pr_{5}(C_{2})}Cl_{10}	hexagonal	P6_{3}/m	a=8.426 c=14.894 Z=2	915.9		dark red	
Rb{Pr_{5}(C_{2})}Cl_{10}	hexagonal	P6_{3}/m	a=8.4499, c=14.976 Z=2	926	4.19	red; trigonal bipyrmamid of Pr containing a C_{2} unit	
Rb[Nd_{5}(C_{2})]Cl_{10}	hexagonal		a=08.398, c=14.88		4.33	dark red	
Gd_{2}C_{2}Cl		P3̅m	a=3.6902, c=20.308				
Gd_{2}C_{2}Cl_{2}	monoclinic	P3̅m1	a=3.7633, c=9.4593		5.69	black; contains C_{2}^{4−}	
Gd_{3}CCl_{3}	cubic	I4_{1}32	a=10.734		6.34		
Gd_{4}C_{2}Cl_{3}	orthorhombic	Pnma	a=10.596, b=3.684, c=19.627		6.58	bronze	
Gd_{5}C_{2}Cl_{9}	monoclinic	P12_{1}/c1	a=9.182, b=16.12, c=12.886, β=119.86		4.54	black	
Gd_{5}C_{6}Cl_{3}	monoclinic	C12/m1	2.1507,0.37193,1.5331,90,123.34		6.25	bronze	
Gd_{6}C_{3}Cl_{5}	monoclinic	C12/m1	a=16.688,b=3.6969,c=12.824, β=128.26		6.18	grey	
Gd_{10}C_{4}Cl_{17}	triclinic	P1̅	a=8.498, b=9.174, c=11.462, α=104.56, β=95.98, γ=111.35		4.70	black; contains C_{2}^{4−}	
Gd_{10}C_{4}Cl_{18}	triclinic	P1̅	a = 8.498, b = 9.174, c = 11.462, α = 104.56°, β = 95.98°, γ = 111.35°, Z = 1			contains C_{2}^{4−}	
[Gd_{4}(C_{2})](Cl, I)_{6}	tetragonal	P4/mbm	a = 13.475, c = 12.125, Z = 2			black	
Rb_{2}[Gd_{10}(C_{2})_{2}]Cl_{19}	orthorhombic		a=1.2228, b=2.2347, c=1.3896		4.31	black	
Cs_{2}[Gd_{10}(C_{2})_{2}]Cl_{19}	orthorhombic		a=1.2344, b=2.2434, c=1.3924		4.41	black	
Cs_{3}[Tb_{10}(C_{2})_{2}]Cl_{21}	monoclinic	C2/c	Z = 4; a = 23.187; b = 12.458; c = 15.02; β = 98.13°			black	
Lu_{2}CCl_{2}		R3̅m	a=3.6017, c=27.16		7.07	brown	
Lu_{2}CCl_{2}		P3̅m1	a= 3.5972, c=9.0925		7.05		
Cs_{2}Lu[Lu_{6}C]Cl_{18}		R3̅	a = 9.817, c = 27.232, Z = 3				
Hf_{6}CCl_{14}	orthorhombic	Cmce	a=13.938, b=12.498, c=11.399		5.28		
W_{2}CCl_{8}	orthorhombic	Pbca	a=11.96 b=12.156 c=10.9576		2.83	black	
W_{6}CCl_{15}	monoclinic	C12_{1}/c1	a=9.8831 b=11.8945 c=17.867 β =107.883		5.47	black	
W_{6}CCl_{16}	orthorhombic	Pnma	a=16.637 b=12.958 c=9.797		5.29	black	
W_{6}CCl_{18}		P6̅2c	a=8.923 c=17.503		4.82	black	
W_{30}C_{2}(Cl,Br)_{68}	triclinic	P1̅	a = 12.003, b = 14.862, c = 15.792, α = 88.75°, β = 68.85°, γ = 71.19° Z=1	2472.9		black	
Li[W_{6}CCl_{18}]	hexagonal	P6_{3}/m	a = 8.8648, c = 17.490 Z=2	1188.2		black	
(Bu_{4}N)[W_{6}CCl_{18}]							
(Me_{4}N)_{2}[W_{6}CCl_{18}]							
(Bu_{4}N)_{2}[W_{6}CCl_{18}]							
(Bu_{4}N)_{3}[W_{6}CCl_{18}]							
Na[W_{6}CCl_{18}]	hexagonal	P6_{3}/m	a=8.9592 c=17.5226 Z=2	1188.2			
Ca[W_{6}CCl_{18}]	hexagonal	P6_{3}/m	a=8.9384 c=17.6526 Z=2	1220.4			
Cu[W_{6}CCl_{18}]	triclinic	P1̅	a=8.89 b=8.929 c=17.669 α=81.85 β=80.78 γ=60.39 Z=2	1200.7	5.025	black	
Cu(C_{2}H_{6}OS)_{6}[W_{6}CCl_{18}]	monoclinic	C2/c	a=17.333 b=16.011 c=18.082 β=94.61 Z=4	5001.7	3.035	dark brown	
Cu(C_{2}H_{6}OS)_{4}[W_{6}CCl_{18}]_{2}	triclinic	P1̅	a=9.47 b=12.630 c=13.634 α=104.69° β=90.16° γ=92.99° Z=1	1575.2	4.095	dark violet	
Ag[W_{6}CCl_{18}]	hexagonal	P6_{3}/m	a=8.874 c=17.58 Z=2	1199			
Cs[W_{6}CCl_{18}]·CH_{3}OH	orthorhombic	P2_{1}2_{1}2_{1}	a = 9.6957, b = 14.046, c = 20.238 Z=4		4.623	black; W in trigonal prism around C	
