= S3 =

S3, S-3, S03, S III or similar may refer to:

== Science and technology ==
=== Computing ===
- Amazon S3, also known as Amazon Simple Storage Service, an online data-storage service
- S3 Graphics, a computer-hardware company
- S3 Group, an Irish software company
- S3 Texture Compression, a group of lossy texture compression algorithms
- S3 (programming language), a language used to write the VME operating system and much other system software on the ICL 2900 Series
- S3, a standby mode in the Advanced Configuration and Power Interface (ACPI) specification
- S3, a file extension type for the Motorola S-record file format
- Snapdragon S3, a Qualcomm ARM system-on-a-chip; see List of Qualcomm Snapdragon systems-on-chip

=== Electronics ===
==== Cameras ====
- Canon PowerShot S3 IS, a 2006 digital camera; see Canon PowerShot S
- FinePix S3 Pro, a 2004 interchangeable lens digital single-lens reflex camera by Fujifilm
- Nikon S3, a 1958 35 mm rangefinder film camera
- Nikon Coolpix S3, a digital camera

==== Cellphones ====
- Infinix Hot S3, a smartphone released in 2018
- Samsung Galaxy S III, or Samsung Galaxy S3, a smartphone: the successor to the Samsung Galaxy S II
  - Samsung Galaxy S III Mini, or Samsung Galaxy S3 Mini, the mini version of the Samsung Galaxy S III
- Siemens S3, a Siemens Mobile phone

==== Other electronics ====
- Samsung Galaxy Tab S3, an Android tablet
- Samsung Gear S3, a 2016 smartwatch
- Samsung YP-S3, often referred to as the Samsung S3, an MP3 Player

=== Mathematics ===
- S_{3}, the symmetric group of degree 3, which is identical to the Dihedral group of order 6
- S^{3}, the 3-sphere (a 3-manifold in four-dimensional space)

=== Medicine, anatomy, and botany ===
- Sacral spinal nerve 3, a spinal nerve of the sacral segment
- Third heart sound, or S_{3}, a rare extra heart sound
- ATC code S03, Ophthalmological and otological preparations, a subgroup of the Anatomical Therapeutic Chemical Classification System
- British NVC community S3, Carex paniculata swamp; see Swamps and tall-herb fens in the British National Vegetation Classification system

=== Chemistry ===
- Trisulfur, chemical formula (S_{3}), an allotrope of sulfur
- S-phrase 3, also referred to as S3, "Keep in a cool place", a safety phrase in chemistry; see List of S-phrases

== Entertainment ==
=== Gaming ===
- Expedition to the Barrier Peaks, code S3, a 1980 Dungeons & Dragons adventure module
- S3 Plan, a fictitious program in the Metal Gear Solid 2: Sons of Liberty video game
- Silent Storm: Sentinels, a 2004 video game also known as S3: Silent Storm: Sentinels
- Splatoon 3, a 2022 video game for the Nintendo Switch

=== Other entertainment ===
- Si3 (film), originally titled S III and also known as Singam 3, the third film in the Singam franchise
- SABC 3, South African public television channel, stylised as S3

== Transportation ==
=== Airlines ===
- Ashland Municipal Airport, FAA Location identifier S03, in Oregon, US
- SBA Airlines, IATA code S3, based in Caracas, Venezuela

=== Locomotives ===
- ALCO S-3, an American diesel switching (shunting) locomotive; see ALCO S-1 and S-3
- NER Class S3, a North Eastern Railway steam locomotive class
- Prussian S 3, a steam locomotive

=== Rail lines ===
==== Austria only ====
- S3, a Carinthia S-Bahn line
- S3, a Styria S-Bahn line
- S3, an Upper Austria S-Bahn line
- S3, a Vienna S-Bahn line

==== Germany only ====
- S3 (Berlin), an S-Bahn line
- S3 (Munich), an S-Bahn line in Bavaria
- S3 (Nuremberg), an S-Bahn line in Bavaria
- S3 (Rhine-Main S-Bahn), Frankfurt Rhine-Main
- S3 (Rhine-Ruhr S-Bahn), North Rhine-Westphalia
- S3, a Breisgau S-Bahn line
- S3, a Dresden S-Bahn line
- S3, a Hamburg S-Bahn line
- S3, a Hanover S-Bahn line
- S3, a Rhein-Neckar S-Bahn line
- S3, a Rostock S-Bahn line
- S3, a Stuttgart S-Bahn line

==== Italy only ====
- Line S3 (Milan suburban railway service), commuter rail route in Italy

==== Switzerland only ====
- S3 (RER Vaud), an S-Bahn line
- S3 (St. Gallen S-Bahn), a former S-Bahn line
- S3 (ZVV), a line of the Zurich S-Bahn
- S3, a Basel S-Bahn line
- S3, a Lucerne S-Bahn line

==== International rail lines ====
- S3, a Salzburg S-Bahn line, Austria and Germany
- S3, a Tyrol S-Bahn line, Austria and Italy (South Tyrol)
- S3, a Vorarlberg S-Bahn line, Austria and Switzerland

==== Other ====
- Line S3 (Chengdu Metro), China
- Line S3 (Nanjing Metro), China

=== Cars ===
- Audi S3, released 1999, a version of the Audi A3 small family car
- Bentley S3, a four-door luxury car produced by Bentley from late 1962 until 1965
- Luxgen S3, a sedan produced by Taiwanese-based manufacturer Luxgen starting from 2016
- S3 Roadster, a car produced by South African-based manufacturer Birkin Cars, which was formed in 1982

=== Roads ===
- S3 Shanghai–Fengxian Highway, a planned expressway in Shanghai, China
- S-3 Strategic Highway, operated by the Pakistan Ministry of Defence; see National Highways of Pakistan (even though it is not actually a National Highway)
- Expressway S3 (Poland), a major road in Poland
- California County Route S3, from State Route 78 to Borrego Springs over the Yaqui Pass; see California county routes in zone S
- S3, a British term for a road with a suicide lane

=== Other transportation ===
- Stagecoach Gold bus route S3, a bus route in Oxfordshire, England
- AJS S3 V-twin, a British motorcycle
- Swiss Space Systems (S-3), an aerospace company in Switzerland

== Military ==
- S3 (missile), a French nuclear missile now out of commission
- Lockheed S-3 Viking, an American anti-submarine aircraft developed in the 1970s
- S.3 Springbok, a British aerial reconnaissance aircraft of the 1920s; see Short Springbok
- USS S-3 (SS-107), a U.S. Navy submarine
- Norrland Signal Battalion, designation S 3, a Swedish signal unit
- S3, the operations officer in military units; see Staff (military)

== Business and education ==
- Form S-3, a registration form used by the U.S. Securities and Exchange Commission
- SThree, a British recruitment agency
- S3 Safe Sex Store, an assumed name of Michigan corporation BAK
- S3 Asia MBA, a selective dual-degree, tri-city, tri-university global MBA program
- Third year, also known as S3, Scottish secondary education for pupils aged about 14

== Other uses ==
- S3 (classification), a classification for swimmers based on their level of disability
- Postcode district S3, part of the S postcode area of the UK, covering part of Sheffield

== See also ==
- 3S (disambiguation)
- SSS (disambiguation)
- Schedule 3 (disambiguation)
