= Carbide iodide =

Class of chemical compounds

Carbide iodides are mixed anion compounds containing iodide and carbide anions. Many carbide iodides are cluster compounds, containing one, two or more carbon atoms in a core, surrounded by a layer of metal atoms, and encased in a shell of iodide ions. These ions may be shared between clusters to form chains, double chains or layers.

The metal in carbide iodides is most often a rare earth element. Similar formulas tend to have similar structures. Where R is a rare earth element: R_{12}C_{6}I_{17} contains chains of R_{6} octahedra with a C_{2}^{6−} core and a shell of iodide. R_{4}I_{5}C contains similar chains, but with a single C_{4}^{−} carbide atom. Double chain structures with single carbon atom cores include R_{6}I_{7}C_{2} and R_{3}I_{3}C. Layers of joined octahedra include R_{2}I_{2}C_{2} with an ethanide C_{2}^{4−} core; R_{2}I_{2}C and R_{2}IC with one carbide per octahedron.

Related compounds include carbide chlorides, and carbide bromides. Carbon may be substituted by hydrogen, boron or nitrogen in the core of cluster compounds.

This list does not include cyanides, carbonyls, cyanamides or carbido borates, where carbon has bonds to other non-metals. However, there are carbide iodides that also contain nitride, oxide or other halides.

== List ==
Do not confuse Cl for chlorine, and CI for carbon and iodine.

| formula | system | space group | unit cell | volume | density | comment | reference |
|---|---|---|---|---|---|---|---|
| Sc_{2}I_{3}C | triclinic | P1̅ | a=10.793, b=10.803, c=13.959, α=87.8, β=73.04, γ=60.8 | | 4,76 | black | |
| Sc_{4}C_{2}I_{6} | triclinic | P1̅ | a=10.803 b=13.959 c=10.793 α=106.96° β=119.20° γ=87.80° Z=4 | | | linear chains | |
| Sc_{6}C_{2}I_{11} | triclinic | P1̅ | a=10.046 b=14.152 c=9.030 α=104.36° β=110.45° γ=89.27° Z=2 | | 4.83 | black | |
| Sc_{7}CI_{12} | trigonal | R3 | a=14.717 c=9.847 Z=3 | | 4.99 | dark purple; dissolves in N,N-dimethylacetamide | |
| Sc_{24}C_{10}I_{30} | trigonal | Pa3̅ | a=25.5182, c=25.5182 | | 4.00 | black; supertetrahedron of C_{10} | |
| Y_{2}C_{2}I_{2} | monoclinic | C12/m1 | a=7174, b=3.866, c=10.412 β=92.98, | | 5.25 | bronze; superconductor Tc=9.97K | |
| Y_{2}I_{2}C | trigonal | P3̅m1 | a=3.922 c=10.404 | | 5.32 | olive green | |
| Y_{4}I_{5}C | monoclinc | C2/m | a=18.479 b=3.947 c=8.472 β=103.22° | | 5.53 | dark red; chains | |
| Y_{5}C_{2}I_{9} | monoclinic | C12/c1 | a=18.479, b=3947, c=8472, β=103.22° | | 4.97 | black | |
| Y_{6}C_{2}I_{7} | monoclinc | C2/m | a=21.557 b=3.909 c=12.374 β=123.55° | | 5.53 | black; twin chain | |
| Y_{10}C_{2}I_{13} | monoclinc | C2/m | a=21.317 b=3.95 c=19.889 β=97.40° Z=2 | | | black | |
| Y_{19}C_{6}I_{34} | triclinic | P1̅ | a=9.3683, b=10.341, c=22.173, α=79.104, β=88.175, γ=69.277 Z=1 | 1970.8 | 5.12 | black | |
| Y_{10}C_{2}I_{13} | monoclinic | C12/m1 | a=21.317, b=3.957, c19.899, β=97.4° | | 5.11 | black | |
| Y_{19}C_{6}I_{34} | triclinic | P1̅ | a=93683, b=10.341, c=22.173, α=79.104°, β=88.175°, γ=69.277° | | 5.12 | black | |
| Y_{16}B_{4}C_{8}I_{19} | triclinic | P1̅ | a=12.311, b=13.996, c=19.695, α=74.96, β=89.51, γ=67.03 | | 4.40 | blue | |
| Y_{21}B_{7}C_{14}I_{18} | triclinic | P1̅ | a=10.66, b=15.546, c=18.416, α=82.49, β=85.01, γ=82.92 Z=2 | 2995 | 4.87 | | |
| Y_{6}C_{2}I_{9}N | hexagonal | P6 | a=20.275, c=13.025 | | 4.91 | brown | |
| Y_{7}C_{2}I_{12}N | triclinic | P1̅ | a=9.7124, b=10.3038, c=16.7358, α=101.366, β=92.758, γ=112.799 | | 4.84 | olive green | |
| Y_{7}C_{3}I_{6}O | orthorhombic | Pmma | a=22.494, b=3.837, c=10.791 | | 5.12 | bronze | |
| [Y_{9}C_{4}O]I_{8} | orthorhombic | Pmmn | a = 29.127, b = 3.8417, c = 10.80.29, Z = 2 | | 5.16 | black | |
| Y_{16}C_{7}I_{14}O_{2} | monoclinic | C2/m | a=51.6, b=3.84, c=10.8, β=93 | | 5.15 | | |
| YCI_{0.75}l_{0.25}C | monoclinic | C2/m | a=7.127, b=3.839, c=10.441, β=93.84 | | 4.78 | | |
| YI_{0.75}CBr_{0.25} | monoclinic | C2/m | a=7.131, b=3.847, c=10.358, β=93.73 | | 5.06 | | |
| Zr_{6}CI_{12} | trigonal | R3̅ | a=14.508, c=10.007 | | 5.69 | | |
| Zr_{6}CI_{14} | orthorhombic | Cmce | a=15.69, b=14.218, c=12.808 | | 5.43 | | |
| K_{0.58}Zr_{6}CI_{14} | orthorhombic | Cmca | a=15.727, b=14.278, c=12798 | | 5.54 | | |
| RbZr_{6}I_{14}C | orthorhombic | Cmca | a=15.768, b=14.296, c=12.849 | | 5.55 | | |
| CsY_{10}C_{4}I_{18} | triclinic | P1̅ | a=11.138, b=11.201, c=11.325, α=66.92, β=87.26, γ=60.87 Z=1 | 1117.2 | 4.99 | black | |
| Cs_{2}Zr_{7}I_{18}C | trigonal | R3̅c | a=10.744, c=29.409 | | 5.42 | | |
| CsZr_{6}I_{14}C | orthorhombic | Cmca | a=15.803, b=14.305, c=12.934 | | 5.61 | | |
| Cs_{2}Zr_{7}I_{18}C | trigonal | R3̅ | a = 10.744, c = 29.409 Z=3 | | 4.99 | black | |
| LaIC | monoclinic | C12/m1 | a=7.619, b=4.1252, c=10.7513, β=93.143 | | 5.47 | bronze | |
| LaIC | monoclinic | C12/m1 | a=7.6132, b=4.1324, c=10.859, β=100.835 | | 5.50 | bronze | |
| La_{3}I_{5}C | triclinic | P1̅ | a=7.955, b=9.687, c=9.728, α=107.81, β=97.34, γ=105.56 | | 5.28 | violet | |
| La_{3}C2I_{3} | orthorhombic | C222_{1} | a=12.026 b=17.739 c=17.735 | | 5.77 | black | |
| La_{4}C_{1.5}I_{5} | monoclinic | C2/m | a = 19.849, b = 4.1410, c = 8.956, β = 103.86° | | 5.62 | metallic grey | |
| La_{4}C_{2}I_{5} | orthorhombic | Immm | a = 19.907, b = 4.1482, c = 8.963, β = 104.36° | | | | |
| La_{5}C_{2}I_{9} | orthorhombic | Pbca | a = 8.025, b = 16.887, c = 35.886 Z=8 | 4863 | 5.08 | >850° metallic green | |
| La_{5}C_{2}I_{9} | triclinic | P1̅ | a = 8.006, b = 10.088, c = 14.383, α = 79.34°, β = 80.75° and γ = 85.07° Z=2 | 1124.9 | 5.494 | <800 °C; dark red; air sensitive | |
| La_{6}I_{10}(C_{2}) | triclinic | P1̅ | a = 9.687, b = 9.728, c = 7.955, α = 97.34°, β = 105.56° and γ = 107.81° Z=1 | 699.33 | 5.276 | violet; air sensitive | |
| La_{7}C_{3}I_{10} | triclinic | P1̅ | a=9.761, b=11.79, c=14.055, α=79.6, β=71.49, γ=65.79 | | 5.42 | greenish black | |
| La_{10}C_{4}I_{15} | triclinic | P1̅ | a=9.747, b=10.655, c=11.736, α=93.68, β=114.44, γ=109.28 | | 5.45 | dark red | |
| La_{10}I_{15}(C_{2})_{2} | triclinic | P1̅ | a = 9.747, b = 10.655, c = 11.736, α = 93.68°, β = 114.44° and γ = 109.28° Z=1 | 1018.39 | 5.447 | dark red; air sensitive | |
| La_{12}I_{17}(C_{2})_{3} | monoclinic | C12/c1 | a= 19.927, b= 12.636, c = 19.399, β = 90.24(1)°, Ζ = 4 | 4884.6 | 5.30 | black | |
| La_{14}(C_{2})_{3}I_{20} | triclinic | P1̅ | a = 9.761, b = 11.790, c = 14.055, α = 79.60°, β = 71.49°, γ = 65.79° | | | greenish black | |
| La_{4}B_{2}I_{5}C | monoclinic | | a=23.303, b=4.299, c=18.991, β=126.22 | | 5.30 | black | |
| La_{9}B_{3}C_{6}I_{5} | orthorhombic | | a=3.9481, b=33.857, c=8.218 | | 6.01 | | |
| La_{4}I_{6}CN | tetragonal | | a=13.953 c=9.811 | | 4.67 | olive green | |
| LaCI_{0.75}l_{0.25}C | monoclinic | C2/m | a=7.5764, b=4.0758, c=10.7266, β=93.384 | | 5.12 | bronze | |
| LaI_{0.75}CBr_{0.25} | monoclinic | C2/m | a=75857, b=4.0981, c=10.6782, β=93.272 | | 5.33 | bronze | |
| Ce_{3}I_{5}C | triclinic | P1̅ | a=7.875, b=9.588, c=9.648, α=107.69, β=97.24, γ=105.32 | | 5.43 | violet | |
| Ce_{5}C_{2}I_{9} | orthorhombic | Pbca | a = 7.9284, b = 16.714, c = 35.530 | | 5.27 | red | |
| Ce_{6}I_{10}C_{2} | triclinic | P1̅ | a=9.588 b=9.648 c=7.875 α = 97.24°, β = 105.32° and γ = 107.69 Z=1 | 652.3 | 5.432 | violet | |
| Ce_{7}C_{3}I_{10} | triclinic | P1̅ | a=9.688, b=11.67, c=13.932, α=80.16, β=71.81, γ=65.88 | | 5.57 | greenish black | |
| Ce_{12}C_{6}I_{17} | monoclinic | C12/c1 | a=19.731, b=12.495, c=19.182, β=90.36 | | 5.49 | black; chains | |
| Ce_{14}(C_{2})_{3}I_{20} | triclinic | P1̅ | a = 9.688, b = 11.670, c = 13.932, α = 80.16°, β = 71.81°, γ = 65.88° | | | greenish back; semiconductor | |
| Ce_{4}B_{2}I_{5}C | monoclinic | | a=23.194, b=4.29, c=18.822, β=126.5 | | 5.42 | black | |
| Ce_{8}I_{6}(C_{2})(N)_{2} | | | | | | | |
| Ce_{4}I_{6}CN | tetragonal | P4_{2}/mnm | a = 13.877, c = 9.665 Z=4 | 1861.3 | 4.810 | brown | |
| Ce_{6}I_{9}C_{2}N | hexagonal | P6/m | a = 41.774, c = 13.719 Z=32 | 20734 | 5.179 | black; moisture sensitive | |
| Ce_{6}I_{9}C_{2}N | hexagonal | P6/m | a = 20.958, c = 13.793 Z=8 | 5246 | 5.117 | black | |
| Pr{Pr_{6}C}I_{12} | | | | | | black | |
| Pr_{7}C_{3}I_{10} | triclinic | P1̅ | a=9663, b=11.619, c=13.866, α=80.31, β=71.79, γ=65.9 | | 5.64 | black | |
| Pr_{12}(C_{2})_{3}I_{17} | monoclinic | C2/c | a=19.610, b=12.406, c=19.062, β=90.45° | | 5.62 | metallic grey | |
| Nd_{2}C_{2}I_{2} | monoclinic | C2/m | | | | layered | |
| Nd_{12}(C_{2})_{3}I_{17} | monoclinic | C2/c | a=19.574, b=112.393, c=19.003, β=90.41° | | 5.71 | black | |
| Rb{Pr_{6}C_{2}}I_{12} | triclinic | P1̅ | a = 9.601, b = 9.570, c = 10.034, α = 71.74, β = 70.69, γ = 72.38°, Z = 1 | 805.6 | 5.11 | black | |
| Cs_{2}[Pr_{6}(C_{2})]I_{12} | triclinic | P1̅ | a=9.481, b=9.536, c=10.052; α=71.01; β=84,68, γ=89.37°; Z=1 | 515.3 | 5.16 | black | |
| Cs_{4}[Pr_{6}(C_{2})]I_{13} | tetragonal | I4_{1}/amd | a = 18.049; c = 12.595 | | 4.94 | blue-black with brassy lustre | |
| Gd_{2}IC | hexagonal | P6_{3}/mmc | a=3.801, c=14.792 | | 8.14 | | |
| Gd_{3}I_{3}C | monoclinic | P12_{1}/m1 | a=8.658, b=3.926, c=11.735, β=92.26 | | 7.20 | bronze; twin chains | |
| Gd_{4}I_{5}C | monoclinic | C2/m | a=18.587 b=3.978 c=8.561 β=103.3 | | | chains | |
| Gd_{6}C_{2}I_{7} | monoclinic | C2/m | a=21.767 b=3.947 c=12.459 β=123.6 | | | twin chains | |
| Gd_{7}I_{12}C | trigonal | R3̅ | a=15.288 c=10.291 | | | | |
| Gd_{10}C_{4}I_{16} | triclinic | P1̅ | a=10.463 b=16.945 c=11.220 α=99.16 β=92.68 γ=88.06 | | 6.18 | black | |
| Gd_{12}(C_{2})_{3}I_{17} | monoclinic | C2/c | a = 19.297, b = 12.201, c = 18.635, β = 90.37° | | 6.13 | black; Gd_{6} octahedra containing C_{2} | |
| Gd_{4}I_{6}CN | tetragonal | | a=13.578 c=9.313 | | 5.48 | brown red; air sensitive | |
| Gd_{4}I_{6}CN | hexagonal | | a=40.806 c=9.232 | | 5.65 | brown red | |
| Gd_{19}(C_{2})_{3}I_{34} | triclinic | P1̅ | a = 9.4172, b = 10.339, c = 22.371, α = 79.00°, β = 88.32°, γ = 69.25° Z=1 | 2007.6 | 6.10 | black; air sensitive | |
| [Gd_{4}(C_{2})](Cl, I)_{6} | tetragonal | P4/mbm | a = 13.475, c = 12.125, Z = 2 | | | black | |
| Gd_{6}C_{3}I_{4.56}Cl_{4.44} | tetragonal | P4/mbm | a=13.475, c=12.125 | | 5.18 | black | |
| Tb_{2}IC | hexagonal | P6_{3}/mmc | a=3.7707, c=14.66 | | 8.40 | | |
| Tb_{2}C_{2}I_{2} | monoclinic | C2/m | | | | layered | |
| Dy_{2}I_{3}C | orthorhombic | Pnnm | a=13.622, b=14.335, c=8.396 | | 5.82 | | |
| Dy_{5}C_{2}I_{9} | monoclinic | P12_{1}/c1 | a=10.47, b=17.152, c=13.983, β=121.14 | | 6.12 | black | |
| Dy_{7}C_{2}I_{12} | trigonal | R3̅ | a=15.233, c=10.649 | | 6.25 | black | |
| Dy_{12}(C_{2})_{3}I_{17} | monoclinic | C2/c | a=19.149, b=12.069, c=18.595, β=90.54 | | 6.46 | black | |
| {(C_{2})_{2}O_{2}Dy_{12}}I_{18} | hexagonal | P6/m | a = 20.2418, c = 12.9921, Z = 8 | 4610.1 | 6.22 | black | |
| {(C_{2})_{2}O_{2}Dy_{14}}I_{24} | triclinic | P1̅ | a = 9.730, b = 10.330, c = 16.770, α = 101.42°, β = 92.72°, γ = 112.75°, Z = 2 | 1509.3 | 5.94 | black | |
| Ho_{7}C_{2}I_{12}N | triclinic | P1̅ | a=9.688, b=10.287, c=16.678, α=101.31, β=92.78, γ=112.8 | | 6.06 | brown red | |
| [Ho_{9}C_{4}O]I_{8} | orthorhombic | Pmmn | a=3.8157, b=28.867, c=10.748 | | 7.19 | | |
| Er_{4}I_{5}C | monoclinic | C2m | a=18.521 b=4.015 c=8.478 β=103.07 | | | | |
| Er_{6}C_{2}I_{7} | monoclinic | C2/m | a=21.375 b=3.869 c=12.319 β=123.50 | | | twin chains | |
| [Er_{9}C_{4}O]I_{8} | orthorhombic | Pmmn | a=3.8037, b=28.818, c=10.7381 | | 7.29 | | |
| Cs[Er_{6}C]I_{12} | trigonal | R3̅ | a=11.120 c=20.638 Z=3 | 443.71 | 6.02 | black | |
| [Er_{14}(C_{2})_{2}(N)_{2}]l_{24} | triclinic | P1̅ | a = 9.663, b = 10.276, c = 16.634, α =101.374°, β = 92.85°, γ = 112.83°, Z =2 | 1477.8 | 6.14 | red brown | |
| CsEr_{10}(C_{2})_{2}I_{18} | triclinic | P1̅ | a=11.052 b=11.120 c=11.229 α=66.01° β=87.14° γ=60.80° Z=1 | 656.6 | 6.29 | black | |
| [Lu_{9}C_{4}O]I_{8} | orthorhombic | Pmmn | a=3.7575, b=28.333, c=10.6377 | | 7.78 | | |
