= 3S =

3S may refer to:

- 3S, for single, seventies/1970s, stuck, a slang form of sheng nu, a derogatory Chinese term referring to unmarried women in their mid to late twenties
- 3S gondola lift
- 3-S treatment, a method for dealing with unwanted or unwelcome animals in rural areas
- 3S, a series of Toyota S engines
- Air Antilles Express IATA airline designator
- 3S Supersonic gas separation, a brand name for a gas processing technology
- The S line of the Mazda3 automobile
- Threes (video game)
- In Geoinformatics, 3S means the combination of~
  - Geographic information system
  - Global Positioning System
  - Remote sensing

== See also ==
- SSS (disambiguation)
- S3 (disambiguation)
- Three (disambiguation)
