= Elisabeth Gwinn =

American physicist

- Education: Swarthmore, Harvard University
- Known for: Nanoscience, Nanoclusters
- Awards: Lifetime Mentor Award American Association for the Advancement of Science
- Scientific career
- Fields: Physics, Nanoscience
- Workplaces: University of California, Santa Barbara
- Doctoral advisor: Robert Westervelt

Elisabeth (Beth) Gwinn is a professor in the Department of Physics at the University of California, Santa Barbara (UCSB). Gwinn was the first woman to join the Physics faculty at UCSB. Gwinn's research team explores topics at the intersection of nanoscience, biology, and optics. She is particularly well known for her work on silver nanoclusters and bimolecular-stabilized derivatives thereof. Gwinn is a prominent advocate for boosting diverse representation in the field of physics. She has been an advocate for increasing accessibility to STEM careers more generally through mentorship opportunities for public school students in the United States at the elementary and high-school levels.

== Education, career, and research ==
Gwinn received her B.A. from Swarthmore (1982). She went on to receive her Ph.D. in Physics Harvard University in 1987 with Robert Westervelt where her thesis was on "Quasiperiodicity and Frequency Locking in Electrical Conduction in Germanium". Her graduate studies were distinguished by her investigations of electronic transport in germanium. She then continued to execute studies in the areas of experimental condensed matter physics, however switched focus and expanded in diversity with respect to her choice of experimental system. Her post-graduate research topics included contributions to the study of complex heterostructures and interfaces with a focus on the study of 2D electron gases.

Around 2008, Gwinn switched the focus of her research to the study and preparation of solution-phase colloidal nanosystems in aqueous environments and passivated by biomolecules. This was also a particularly drastic shift with respect to the nature of her experiment which became predominantly focused on spectroscopy and the study of optical phenomena in nanosystems. Despite the seemingly significant shift in her main research area and nature of her measurement, Gwinn's work has continued to be distinguished by a high degree of innovation and contributions to scientific community. She is an expert on the preparation and study of silver nanoclusters and photo physical properties thereof. In this space, she was one of the earliest advocate machine learning as a strategy to improve and increase throughput for new the discovery of new materials in the field of nanoscience. For these efforts, she was recently awarded a grant from the National Science Foundation under the Computational & Data Driven Materials Research Program.

== Service to the scientific community ==
In the area of service to the broader scientific community. In 2002, Gwinn initiated and served as the director of the National Science Foundation (NSF) Let's Explore Applied Physical Science (LEAPS) program. LEAPS was structured to award fellowships to graduate and undergraduate students at UCSB to serve as mentors for students in local public elementary and junior high schools. After 12 years of continuous funding support from the NSF and direction under Gwinn's leadership, the LEAPS program evolved into the School of Scientific Thought, also based at UCSB. The School of Scientific Thought (SST) is currently organized as a Saturday morning program for local high school students in which UCSB researchers introduce students to scientific concepts via real-world examples in nanotechnology and other related fields.

During her time as independent research group leader, Gwinn has also supported underrepresented groups in STEM through her direct mentorship as a principal investigator. Approximately half of Gwinn's Ph.D. students have been women. Her undergraduate researchers have also been distinguished by diversity with nearly 20% identifying as underrepresented minorities and 30% being women. At UCSB, Gwinn has been a long-term advisor to the UCSB Women in Physics student group. She was also the leader of a federal financial assistance program for high-performing students at UCSB, the Graduate Assistance in Areas of National Need program in physics. For her mentorship and scientific service, in 2019 Gwinn was awarded the Lifetime Mentor Award of the American Association for the Advancement of Science.

== Selected publications ==
In the area of silver nanoclusters:

- Gwinn E, Schultz D, Copp SM, Swasey S (February 2015). "DNA-Protected Silver Clusters for Nanophotonics". Nanomaterials. 5 (1): 180–207. doi:10.3390/nano5010180. PMC 5312861. PMID 28347005.
- Afonin KA, Schultz D, Jaeger L, Gwinn E, Shapiro BA (2015). "Silver nanoclusters for RNA nanotechnology: steps towards visualization and tracking of RNA nanoparticle assemblies". In Guo P, Haque F (eds.). RNA Nanotechnology and Therapeutics. Methods in Molecular Biology. Vol. 1297. Springer New York. pp. 59–66. doi:10.1007/978-1-4939-2562-9_4. ISBN 978-1-4939-2561-2. PMC 6345514. PMID 25895995.
- Schultz D, Gwinn E (April 2011). "Stabilization of fluorescent silver clusters by RNA homopolymers and their DNA analogs: C,G versus A,T(U) dichotomy". Chemical Communications. 47 (16): 4715–7. doi:10.1039/c0cc05061j. PMID 21412565.
- Copp SM, Bogdanov P, Debord M, Singh A, Gwinn E (September 2014). "Base motif recognition and design of DNA templates for fluorescent silver clusters by machine learning". Advanced Materials. 26 (33): 5839–45. Bibcode:2014AdM....26.5839C. doi:10.1002/adma.201401402. PMID 25043854. S2CID 45959824.
- Gwinn, Elisabeth G.; Pavlovich, James; Lopez-Acevedo, Olga; Leal, Leonardo Espinosa; Swasey, Steven M. (2015-05-14). "Silver (I) as DNA glue: Ag+-mediated guanine pairing revealed by removing Watson-Crick constraints". Scientific Reports. 5 10163. Bibcode:2015NatSR...510163S. doi:10.1038/srep10163. ISSN 2045-2322. PMC 4431418. PMID 25973536.

Prior research endeavors:

- Carmeli I, Bloom F, Gwinn EG, Kreutz TC, Scoby C, Gossard AC, Ray SG, Naaman R (2006-09-11). "Molecular enhancement of ferromagnetism in GaAs/GaMnAs heterostructures". Applied Physics Letters. 89 (11) 112508. Bibcode:2006ApPhL..89k2508C. doi:10.1063/1.2236935.
- Asmar NG, Gwinn EG (August 1992). "Jellium surfaces in AlxGa1-xAs heterostructures". Physical Review B. 46 (8): 4752–4756. Bibcode:1992PhRvB..46.4752A. doi:10.1103/PhysRevB.46.4752. PMID 10004234.
- Gwinn EG, Hopkins PF, Rimberg AJ, Westervelt RM, Sundaram M, Gossard AC (May 1990). "Characterization of the electron gas in wide parabolic GaAs/AlxGa1-xAs quantum wells". Physical Review B. 41 (15): 10700–10705. Bibcode:1990PhRvB..4110700G. doi:10.1103/PhysRevB.41.10700. PMID 9993478.

== Awards ==
- Lifetime Mentor Award of the American Association for the Advancement of Science, 2019
