= Luxgen U5 =

Subcompact crossover SUV

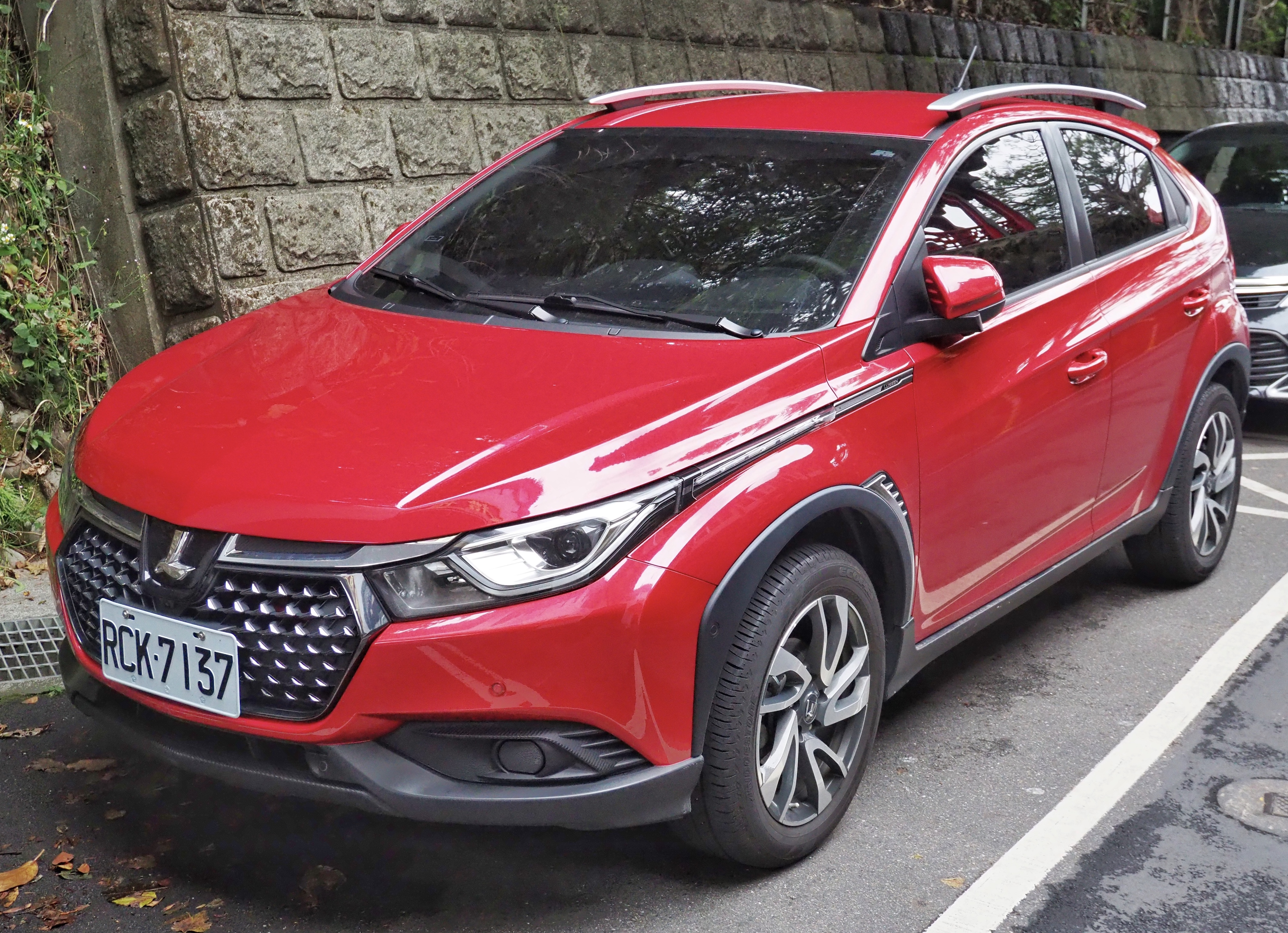

Overview
- Manufacturer: Luxgen
- Production: 2017–2020
- Assembly: Taiwan: Miaoli; China: Hangzhou (Dongfeng Yulon)
- Designer: James C. Shyr

Body and chassis
- Class: Subcompact crossover SUV (B)
- Body style: 5-door SUV
- Layout: Front engine, front wheel drive
- Related: Luxgen S3

Powertrain
- Engine: Petrol: 1.6 L Dongfeng DFMA16 I4
- Transmission: CVT

Dimensions
- Wheelbase: 2,620 mm (103.1 in)
- Length: 4,395 mm (173.0 in)
- Width: 1,783 mm (70.2 in)
- Height: 1,607 mm (63.3 in)

The Luxgen U5 is a 5-seater subcompact crossover SUV produced by the Taiwanese car company Luxgen.

== Overview ==
The U5 crossover is based on the Luxgen S3 subcompact sedan and is positioned under the Luxgen U6 compact crossover. It is powered by the DFMA16 1.6 L (1,600 cc) petrol engine supplied by Dongfeng Motor Corporation with 120 hp (89 kW) and 15.3 kg⋅m (150 N⋅m; 111 lbf⋅ft).

The Luxgen U5 went on sale in Taiwan in September, 2017. There are five trims in Taiwan, which are Big Screen, APA, AR, Hi-Fi, and Vogue+. The base trim has 17-inch alloy wheels, cruise control, climate control, 12-inch display, ESC, TCS, HSA and dual airbags. APA comes in 6 airbags and front radar. AR adds power fold side mirrors, and AR Around View+. Hi-Fi adds front fog lamp and base speaker. Vogue+ comes in two-tone exterior and sunroof.

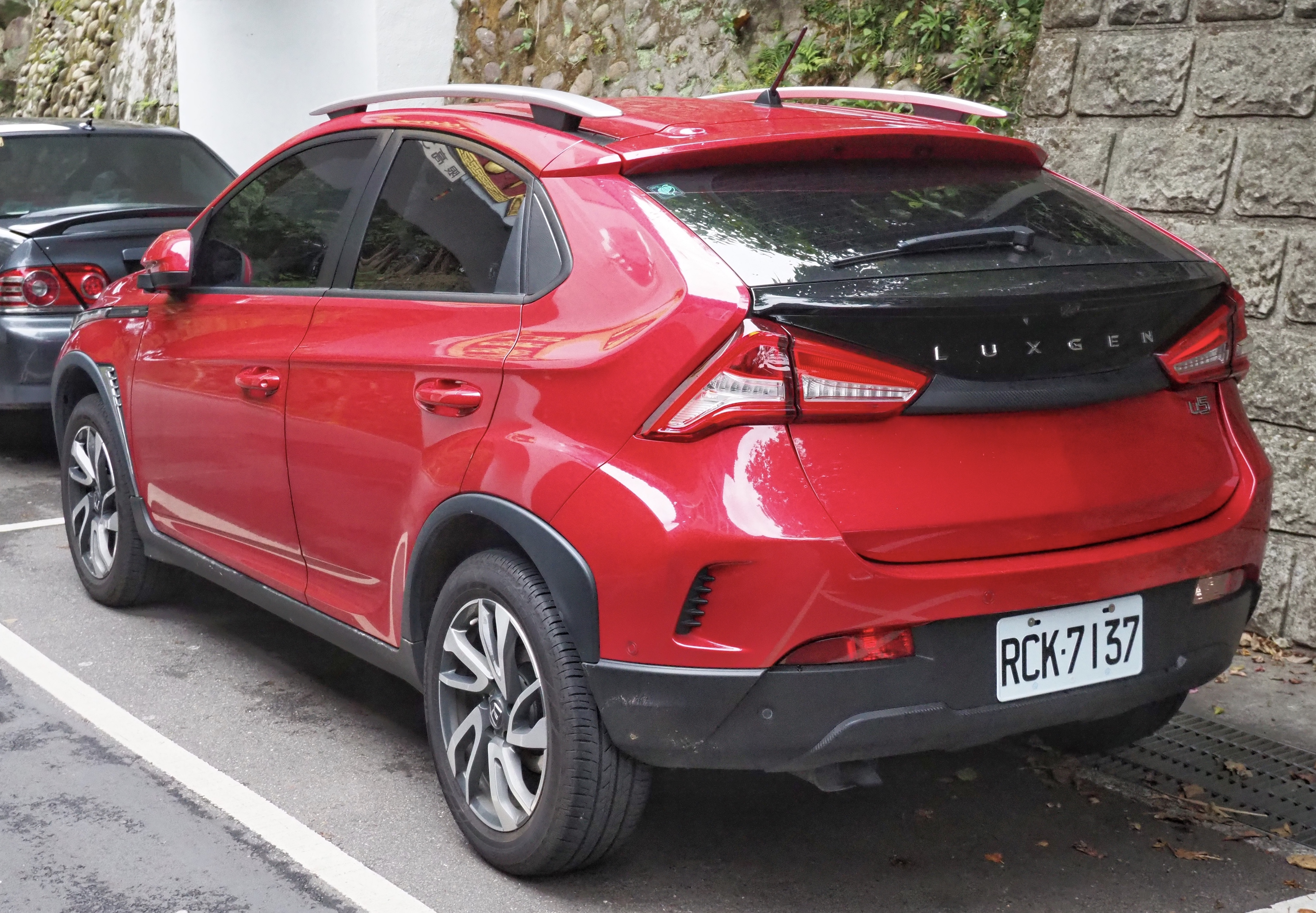
Luxgen U5 rear view

The interior of a Luxgen U5

== Discontinuation ==
In 2020, Luxgen confirmed that both S3 and U5 would cease production and would be relaunched as electric model.
