= James C. Shyr =

Chinese-American automotive designer

James C. Shyr (石志傑/杰) is a Chinese-American automotive designer widely known for his design contributions to the first and second generation Buick LaCrosse (2005-2009 and 2010-2016).

From 2018, he has been the Chief Design Officer and founding partner of Human Horizons, where he is responsible for presiding over the design studio and overseeing the product strategies.

In 2001, he became the first expatriate of General Motors (GM) to be dispatched to China from North America. He was responsible for directing the creation of design strategies exclusive to China, and contributing to global design strategies and developing mid- and long-term design concepts and products for the Greater China Region.

== Background ==
Born in Tokyo, Japan, where his father Richard Jung Hsien Shyr was earning his doctoral degree at the University of Tokyo, the young Shyr developed an early interest in automobiles from being driven in family cars and the thriving Japanese automotive environment at the time. Shyr later moved to Taiwan with his family and attended elementary school and junior high school there.

The family moved to the United States in 1977, where Shyr attended San Gorgonio High School in San Bernardino, California. Upon graduation, he enrolled in several colleges in an attempt to get into the automotive industry. In 1987, at the advice of his high school drafting teacher, Mr. Uhl and his friend, Robert Gibson, Shyr enrolled at the Art Center College of Design in Pasadena, California, graduating in 1991 with a Bachelor of Science degree in Transportation Design.

Shyr began his career in France with Automobile Citroën (later known as PSA Peugeot Citroën) and moved on to Toyota North America, followed by Shanghai General Motors (SGM) then Nissan in Taiwan.

== Career ==
At General Motors (GM), Shyr was deeply involved in brand character management and product strategies of the company, where he penned such designs as the original first-gen Buick LaCrosse in 2005, Cadillac SLS in 2007 and second-gen Buick LaCrosse in 2010, among various other brands and models within GM. He was instrumental to the design of the two generations of LaCrosse which helped establish Buick’s design language from 2008 and beyond. He would later oversee the key styling element of the signature “double sweep spear” body side that every Buick still follows to date, and laid the foundation for the second-gen GL8, also known as the “executive carrier” in China. He also oversaw the sporty Buick Riviera concept which greatly influenced Buick’s design language.

In 2000, Shyr was elected into the Nissan Design Strategy Board, representing the ASEAN in Nissan Global Design.

He became the longest serving Director of Design at Pan Asia Technical Automotive Center (PATAC) of General Motors China based in Shanghai. As well as being one of the eight members of the “GM Global Design Leadership Team”, from 2001 until 2007.

In 2001 from Warren, Michigan, GM Global Design Center, Mr. Shyr was appointed and expatriated as the Director of Design at GM China-PATAC Design Center to Shanghai, China, under GM Asia Pacific Operations, where he was solely and directly responsible for all designs of General Motors vehicles branded under Buick, Chevrolet, and Cadillac within the Greater China Region. Shyr’s directorship influenced all GM vehicles from 2002 to 2011 model years mainly in China, although some were for North America, and other parts of the world, with a total of more than 10 million cars on the road today.

During 2003 to 2007, Shyr was also one of the seven key members of GM’s Global Design Leadership Team (GDLT), the highest design decision committee worldwide within General Motors Corporation. As the longest serving Director of Design in the history of GM China-PATAC Design Center to date (from 2001 to 2007, during the GM’s up-starting years in China), Shyr played a key role in laying down the product and design capability foundations that GM is enjoying today in China, the world’s largest automotive market and one of the most important overseas revenue sources for General Motors worldwide.

At PATAC, Shyr led several unique concept vehicles, notably, the Kunpeng CAV, which became the first concept car designed in China to be shown at the Shanghai Auto Show and the North American International Auto Show in Detroit in 2003. The Buick Riviera concept car exhibited at the Shanghai, Detroit, Chicago Auto Shows bears its “legendary” name and was a show car with North American heritage that was designed from scratch in China for the first time in history. It was voted as one of the "Ten Most Significant Design in China's Automotive History."

From 2008 to 2017, Shyr served as Vice President of Design for the Luxgen brand under the Yulon Group.

Starting from 2018, Shyr was Chief Design Officer and founding partner of Human Horizons, and was in charge of the design of the HiPhi NEV brand.

=== Production Vehicles ===
Human Horizons - HiPhi

- HiPhi X Production Prototype (2019) - (proportion, exterior, interior, color & trim influence)

Luxgen

- Luxgen U5 (2017 - present and derived models) - (architecture, proportion, exterior, interior, color & trim, derivatives influence)
- Luxgen S3 (2016 - present and derived models) - (architecture, proportion, exterior, interior, color & trim, MCE, derivatives influence)
- Luxgen U6 (2014 - present and derived models) - (architecture, proportion, exterior, interior, color & trim, MCE, derivatives influence)
- Luxgen S5 (2012 - present and derived models) - (architecture, proportion, exterior, interior, color & trim, MCE influence)

Buick

- Buick GL8 (2011) - (architecture/proportion) - (architecture, proportion influence)
- Buick Excelle GT/Buick Verano (2010/2011) - (exterior)**
- New Buick Lacrosse (2010/2011) - (interior/exterior)*/**
- Buick Regal (2003/2009/2010) - (exterior)
- Buick Park Avenue (2007) - (interior)*
- Buick Lacrosse (2006/2007) - (interior/exterior)*/**
- Buick GL-8 Firstland (2005) - (interior/exterior)*

Cadillac

- Cadillac SLS (2007/2010) - (interior)*

Chevrolet

- Chevrolet New Sail (2010/2011) - (interior/exterior)*/**
- Wuling N200 (2006/2007) - (interior/exterior)*/**
- Chevrolet Lova/Aveo/Daewoo Gentra (2006) - (exterior)**
- Chevrolet Sail (2003) - (interior/exterior)*

=== Concept Vehicles ===
- Human Horizons Concept U - Ultimate Mobility (2019) - (proportion, exterior, interior, color & trim influence)
- Human Horizons Concept H - Hyper-velocity (2018) - (proportion, exterior, interior, color & trim influence)
- Human Horizons Concept A - Active Agility (2018) - Active Agility (2018) - (proportion, exterior, interior, color & trim influence)
- Luxgen S3 EV+ (2016 Beijing Auto Show)
- Luxgen Neora (2011 Shanghai Auto Show) - (proportion, exterior, interior, color & trim influence)
- Buick Riviera (2007 Shanghai Auto Show, 2008 Detroit and Chicago Auto Show)
- GM-PATAC ALA.s (2005 Shanghai Auto Show)
- GM-PATAC Kun Peng (2003 Shanghai and Detroit Auto Show Michelin Challenge

Legend:

  - Influence on architecture and proportion
- Influence on color and trim

Minor influence if not starred

== Personal ==
Shyr is married to Vicky Chuan-Chuan Wu. He has two sons, from his previous marriage, Michael (born 1983) and Alexander (born 1988).
