= Luxgen S3 =

Subcompact sedan

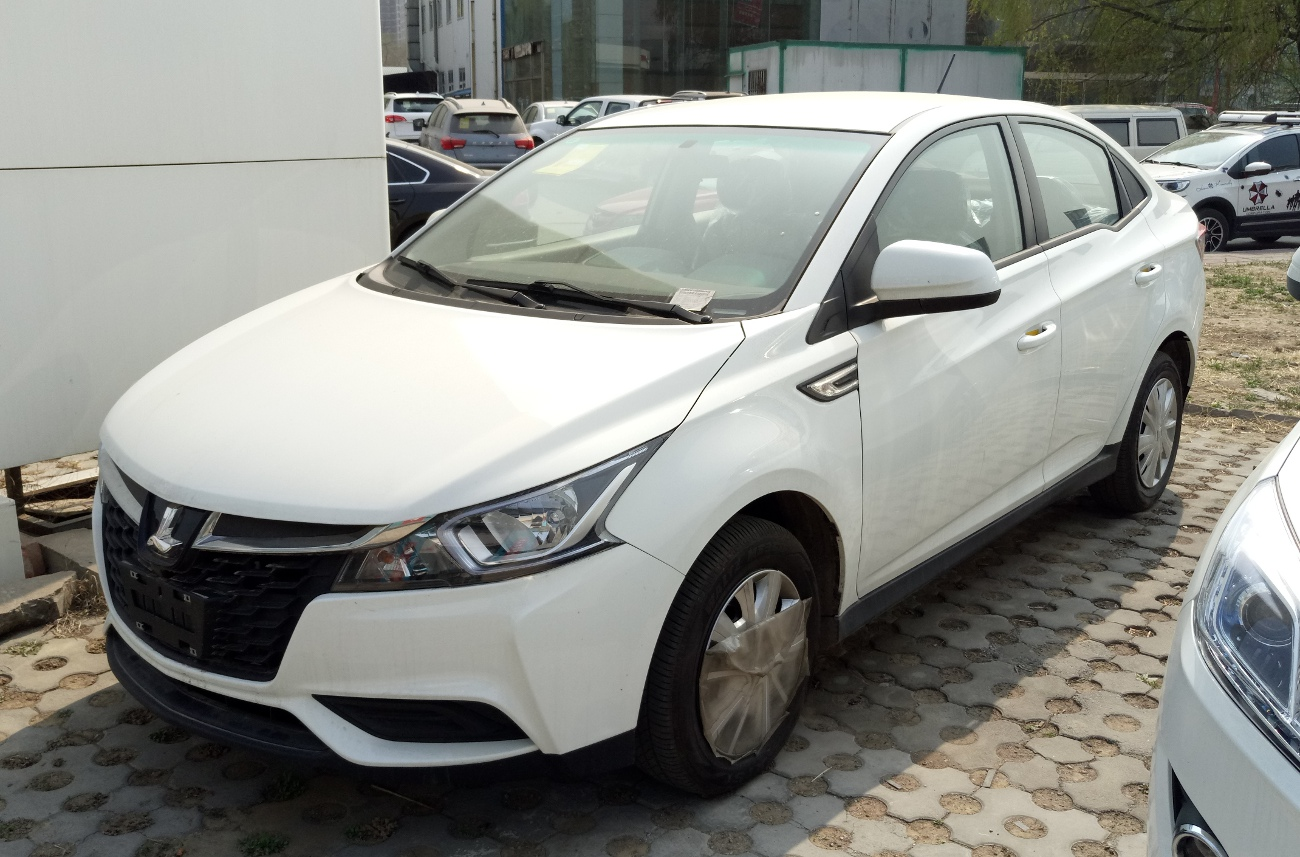

Overview
- Manufacturer: Luxgen
- Production: 2016–2020
- Assembly: Taiwan: Miaoli; China: Hangzhou (Dongfeng Yulon)
- Designer: James C. Shyr; Ruo-Xiang Huang (exterior designer)

Body and chassis
- Class: Subcompact car (B)
- Body style: 4-door sedan
- Layout: Front engine, front wheel drive
- Related: Luxgen U5

Powertrain
- Engine: Petrol: 1.6 L Dongfeng DFMA16 I4
- Electric motor: 1xAC PMSM (EV)
- Power output: 87 kW (116 hp; 118 PS) (petrol engine); 150 kW (201 hp; 204 PS) (EV)
- Transmission: CVT; 1-speed direct-drive (EV)

Dimensions
- Wheelbase: 2,620 mm (103.1 in)
- Length: 4,551 mm (179.2 in)
- Width: 1,783 mm (70.2 in)
- Height: 1,527 mm (60.1 in)
- Curb weight: 1,230–1,250 kg (2,712–2,756 lb)

The Luxgen S3 is a 5-seater subcompact sedan car produced by the Taiwanese car company Luxgen.

== Overview ==
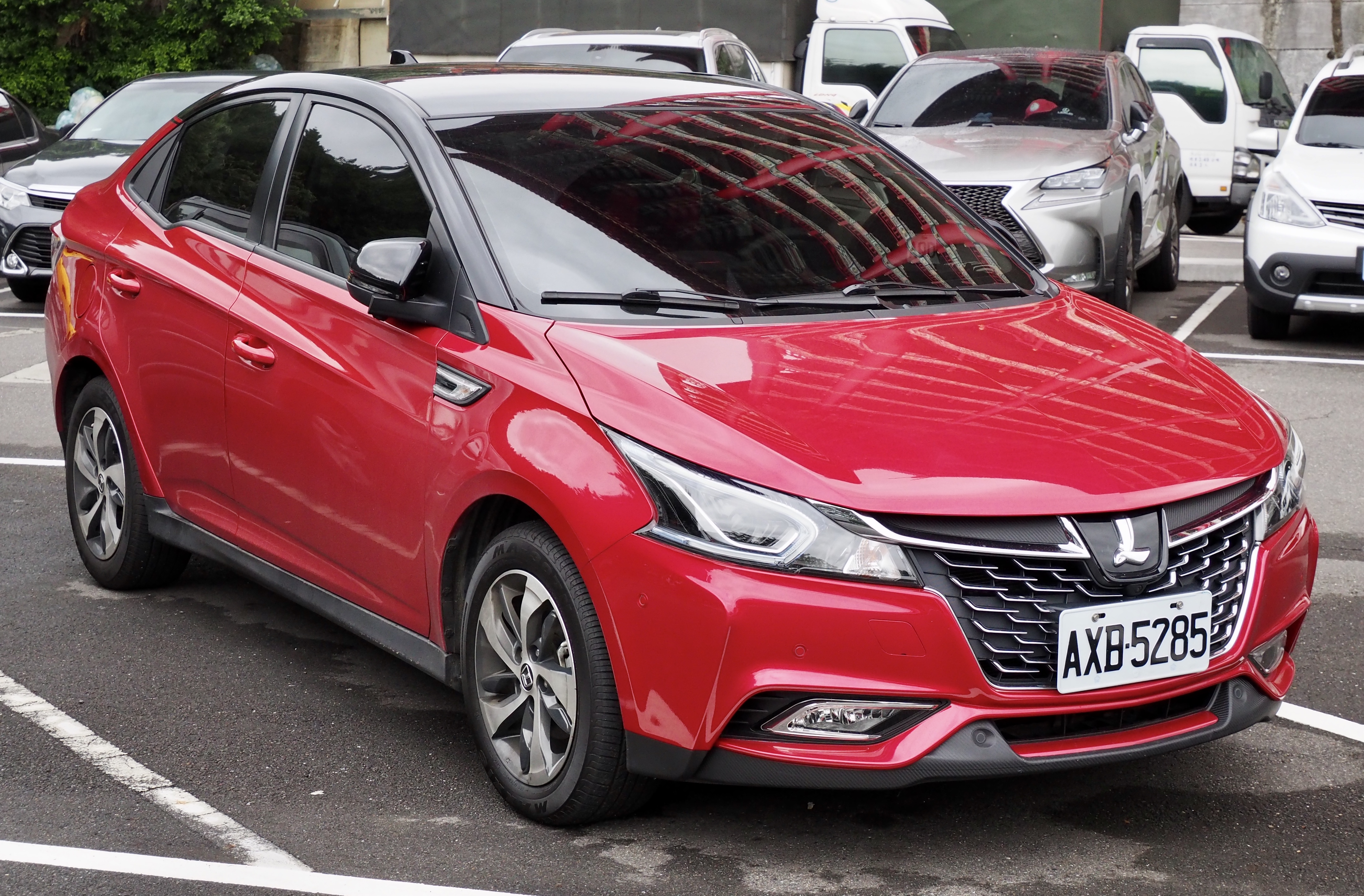
Luxgen S3 sedan front view

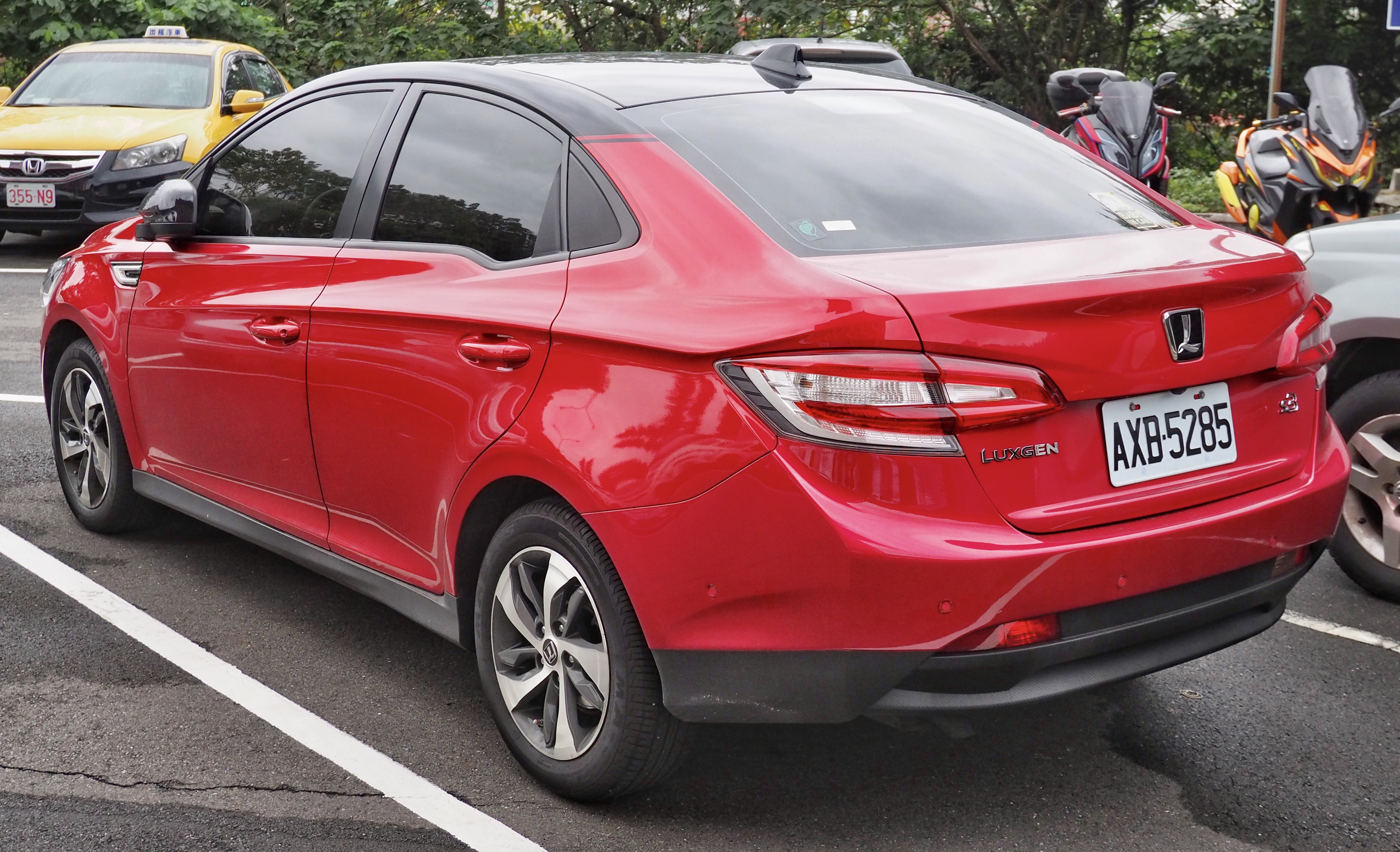
Luxgen S3 sedan rear view

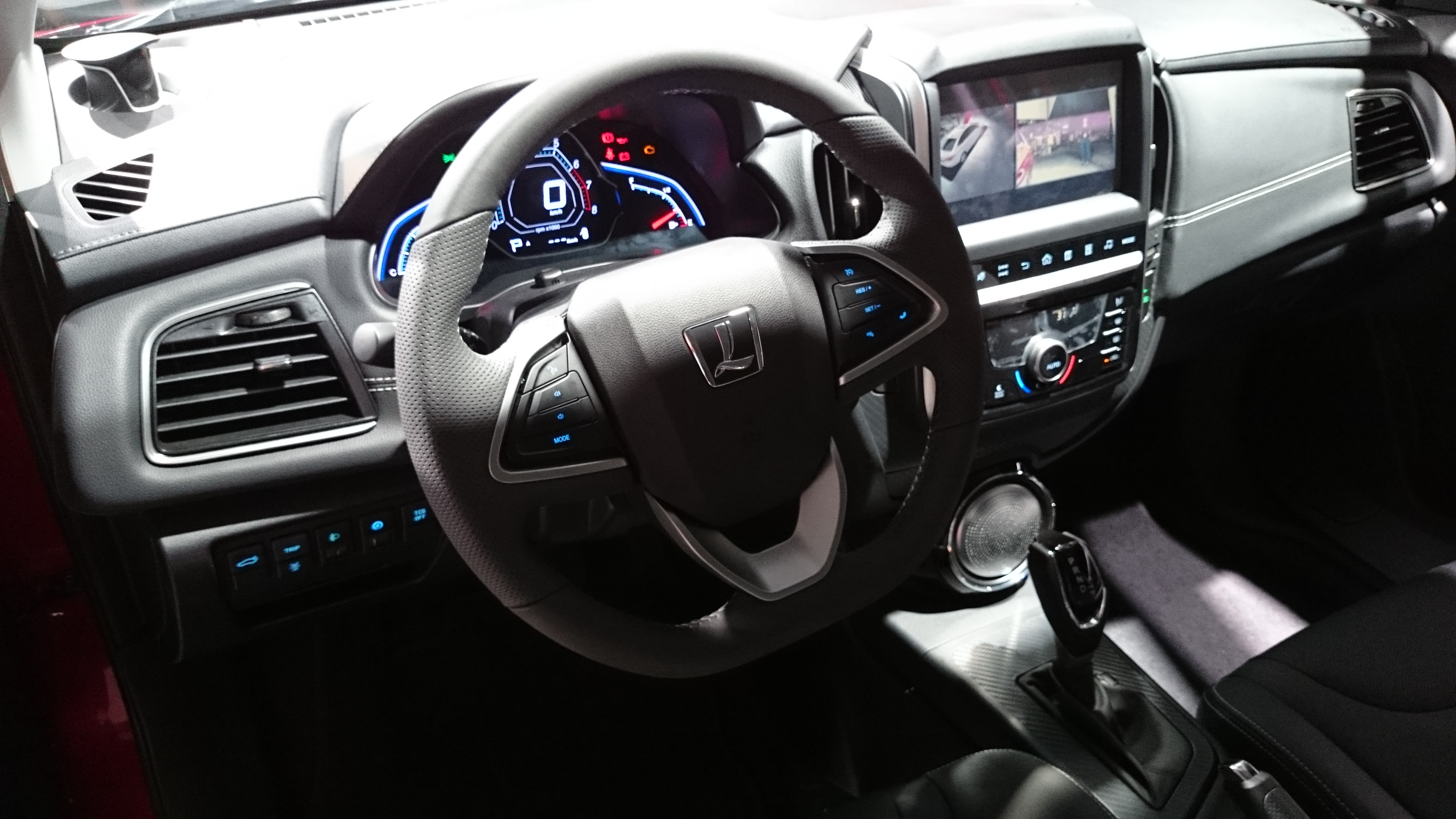
The interior of Luxgen S3

The S3 is the first subcompact car of the brand and positioned under the Luxgen S5 compact sedan. It was styled by the Hua-chuang Automobile Information Technical Center, (HAITEC) and its design center, and was previewed at the 2016 Taipei Auto Show as the Luxgen S3 EV+ concept. The S3 S3 is the second sedan product of the Luxgen brand. It has a 1.6-liter DFMA16 engine supplied from Dongfeng from China giving 116 hp (87 kW) at 6000 rpm and 15.3 kg⋅m (150 N⋅m; 111 lbf⋅ft) at 4200 rpm. It is equipped with 3D X-View+ 3D vision assist system, Active Eagle View+360 degree camera system, and the Side View+ camera system. The initial launch includes 5 trim levels and with the starting price around $17,000. No hatchback version have been developed, but a subcompact hatchback crossover based on the sedan called the Luxgen U5 has been introduced in 2017.

The 2018 model year Luxgen S3 went on sale in January 2018 in Taiwanese market. The new model features 6 airbags, electronic stability control, traction control, hill start assist, and power adjust side mirrors in all trims. Other equipments include 12-inch display, AR view+ system, and two-tone exterior.

== EV+ ==
Luxgen also introduced a Luxgen S3 electric vehicle called the S3 EV+ co-developed by AC Propulsion just like the M7 EV+. originally launched before the petroleum-powered version S3 was on sale as the Luxgen S3 EV+ concept to preview the production petroleum-powered S3, the S3 EV+ is powered by E-Drive motors capable of up to 150 kW (201 hp) with 33KWh batteries equivalent to 204 PS (150 kW; 201 hp) maximum power output (Based on New European Driving Cycle tests). The S3 EV+ also supports AC/DC chargers and can be charged up to 80% in 40 minutes.

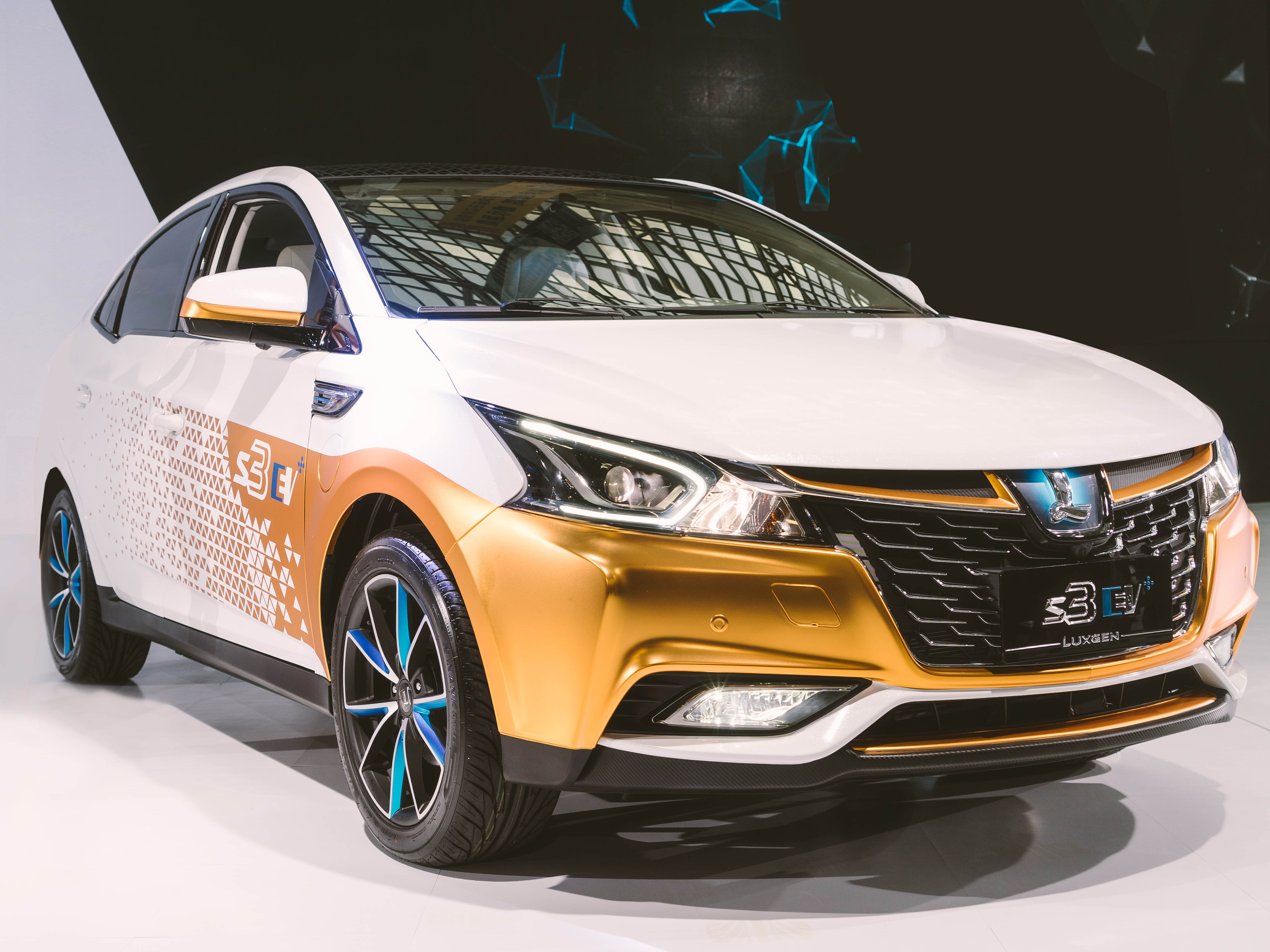
Luxgen S3 EV+ concept front view

== Discontinuation ==
In 2020, Luxgen confirmed that both S3 and U5 were ceased production and would be relaunched as electric model.
