= Beth Ann Karmeisool =

- Born: January 14, 1969 (age 57); Royal Oak, Michigan, United States
- Education: Master of Public Health (MPH), Health Behavior and Health Education
- Alma mater: University of Michigan, MPH 2009
- Occupations: President, BAK, INC.

Beth Ann Karmeisool (born January 14, 1969) is an American entrepreneur, lecturer, certified sexual health educator and certified HIV counselor. She initially became an advocate for safe sexual health after volunteering with the Rainbow Connection, where she worked with children infected with HIV and AIDS, and after interviewing adolescents about their lack of information regarding sex education. Karmeisool founded S3 Safe Sex Store in April 1995, a retail business currently located in Ann Arbor, Michigan. She said that she, “created S3 to provide all people regardless of age, race, religion or sexual orientation a safe place that provides correct, consistent sexual health information.” A 2008 article published by The Michigan Daily stated that, “Karmeisool believes it is her responsibility to inform, empower and educate her clientele about sexual health issues.”

Karmeisool is the president of the corporation, BAK, INC., of which S3 Safe Sex Store is an assumed name. She is the resident agent of SHARE (Sexual Health and Responsible Education), a nonprofit corporation whose goal is to change the way individuals view sex education and assist parents in establishing sexual health guidelines based on family values, morals, and religion.

In 2000, Karmeisool was recognized as Businessperson of the Year from Midwest AIDS Prevention Project for her efforts in outreach education. She was a co-lecturer of the University of Michigan first-year social science seminar, Human Sexuality & Gender Issues, with Frances L. Mayes. Karmeisool has been a keynote speaker at numerous venues and events on the issues of sexual health, including the Interfraternity and Panhellenic Council. She has been identified as an individual in southeastern Michigan,”helping those who are living with HIV and working to prevent others from contracting the virus.”

Karmeisool has a Master of Public Health (MPH) degree in Health Behavior and Health Education from the University of Michigan Ann Arbor. She is a certified HIV counselor who performs free HIV testing.

== Lectures and public appearances ==
- University of Michigan Health System Geriatrics Center, Turner Senior Wellness Program, "Still Sexual: An Open Discussion about Sexual Health" (April 8, 2015)
- University of Michigan, Sexpertise 2015, "Sexy Supplies! Workshop" (February 10, 2015)
- University of Michigan, Sexpertise 2014, "Sexy Supplies! Workshop" (February 12, 2014)
- University of Michigan, Sexpertise 2013: Positive Talk about Sex, Relationships, and Health | SSD, “Sex Toys, Condoms and Lube, Oh My!” (January 24, 2013)
- University of Michigan Multi-Ethnic Student Affairs Spectrum Center, “A conversation about sexual health/sex positivity and more” (February 26, 2013)
- Eastern Michigan University, Love Your Body Day, Sexual Health Workshop (October 16, 2013)

== Awards and credentials ==
- Master of Public Health degree, Health Behavior and Health Education, University of Michigan (2009)
- Businessperson of the Year, Midwest AIDS Prevention Project (2000)
