= SSS =

SSS or Sss may refer to:

== Places and transportation ==
- SSS islands, part of the Netherlands Antilles
- Sheerness-on-Sea railway station, Kent, England, National Rail station code
- Siassi's airport IATA code
- Southern Cross railway station (formerly Spencer Street), Melbourne, Australia, code
- SATS Security Services at Singapore Changi Airport

== Religion ==
- Sisters of Social Service, a Catholic religious institute founded in Hungary
- Congregation of the Blessed Sacrament (Societas Sanctissimi Sacramenti), a Catholic clerical religious congregation

== Schools ==
- Serangoon Secondary School, a secondary school in Hougang, Singapore
- Sheffield Scientific School, formerly separate school of science and engineering at Yale College, Connecticut, until 1956
- Singapore Sports School, a specialised independent school in Woodlands, Singapore
- Smithers Secondary School, British Columbia, Canada
- Smithfield-Selma School, North Carolina, US
- Socialist Sunday School or Socialist School of Science, UK and US
- Streetsville Secondary School, Ontario, Canada

== Computing and electronics ==
- Shamir's Secret Sharing, an algorithm for dividing a secret into multiple pieces
- Single-serving site, a website composed of one page that serves one purpose
- Substructure search, a method to retrieve from a database chemicals matching a given pattern of atoms and bonds
- Subsurface scattering, a mechanism of light transport in 3D graphics
- SSS*, a state-space search algorithm
- Super Scalable System, Cray-3/SSS massively parallel supercomputer project
- Solid-state storage
- Super SteadyShot, Sony image stabilization system

== Medicine ==
- Scotopic sensitivity syndrome, alternate term for Irlen syndrome, a visual disorder
- Sensation Seeking Scale, a psychological measurement
- Sick sinus syndrome, an abnormality of heart rhythm
- Subclavian steal syndrome, a medical condition arising from reversed blood flow
- Superior sagittal sinus, an anatomical structure in the skull which drains cerebrospinal fluid and venous blood

== Arts and entertainment ==
=== Television ===
- SSS (Three-Speed), a character in the anime series MADLAX
- Sport Searching School, fictional school from TV series Sport Ranger
- Súper Sábado Sensacional, Venezuelan TV programme
- SSS, production code of Planet of the Daleks, a 1973 Doctor Who serial

=== Music ===
==== Bands ====
- SSS, short for Sigue Sigue Sputnik, British new wave band
- Short Sharp Shock (band), crossover thrash band from Liverpool, UK
- S/S/S, predecessor of American hip hop group Sisyphus (hip hop group)
- tripleS (or Social Sonyo Seoul), a 24-member K-pop girl group under MODHAUS

==== Albums ====
- Solid State Survivor, 1979, by Yellow Magic Orchestra
- SweetSexySavage, 2017, by Kehlani

==== Songs ====
- "SSS", by The Avett Brothers from Mignonette
- "SSS", by Trickbaby from Hanging Around

==== Other uses in music ====
- SSS International, a record label founded by Shelby Sumpter Singleton
- Super Star Supporters, a fan club for SS501

=== Other uses in arts and entertainment ===
- Swedish Swing Society, a Swedish dance club
- Sonic Speed Simulator, a Roblox video game

== Science and mathematics ==
- Sea surface salinity
- Sign Systems Studies, journal of semiotics
- Super soft source or supersoft X-ray source
- sss, the quark content of an omega baryon (Ω^{−})
- Side-side-side, solution of triangles with 3 sides known
- Siding Spring Survey in astronomy
- similia similibus solventur – a general rule in chemistry meaning "like dissolves like"

== Sports ==
=== Association football / soccer ===
- Daniel Sturridge, Luis Suárez (Uruguayan footballer), and Raheem Sterling, Liverpool F.C.'s front three in the 2013–14 season
- Soccer-specific stadium

=== Other uses in sports ===
- Super Special Stage in motor rallying
- Standard Scratch Score, a golf handicapping system
- Scarborough Shooting Stars, a professional basketball team in the Canadian Elite Basketball League

== Government and military ==
- Selective Service System, the US' military conscription program
- Social security system
  - Social Security System (Philippines)
- State Security Service (Nigeria), a domestic intelligence agency
- Senior Staff Sergeant, a rank in the Singapore Police Force
- SSS Defence, an Indian firm

== Politics ==
- Svensk Socialistisk Samling, Swedish Socialist Unity, former Swedish Nazi party
- Suur-Suomen Sotilaat, a Pan-Finno-Ugric nationalist organization
- Suomalais-Saksalainen Seura (Finnish-German Society), a pro-Nazi Finnish-German friendship association

== Linguistics ==
- Sign Supported Speech, a combination of sign language and English speech
- Sutton's Sign Symbol Sequence, now the International Movement Writing Alphabet, symbols to record movement

== Other uses ==
- Sovran Self Storage, US, NYSE SSS
- Triple-S Management Corporation

== See also ==
- SS (disambiguation)
- SSSS (disambiguation)
- S3 (disambiguation)
- 3S (disambiguation)
- Hiss (disambiguation)
- Snake
