= Carbide bromide =

Class of chemical compounds

Carbide bromides are mixed anion compounds containing bromide and carbide anions. Many carbide bromides are cluster compounds, containing on, two or more carbon atoms in a core, surrounded by a layer of metal atoms, encased in a shell of bromide ions. These ions may be shared between clusters to form chains, double chains or layers.

The great majority of these carbide bromide compounds contain rare earth elements. Since these elements have similar properties, similar structures can be made by substituting the elements. R_{2}CBr_{2} forms a structure with layers of R_{6}C clusters that contain one carbon atom. Each layer has bromide coating the top and bottom. Very similar is R_{2}CBr_{2} which has layers of R_{6}C_{2} clusters containing pairs of carbon atoms. This dicarbon is an ethenide (C_{2}^{4−}), and contains a double bond. Layers have bromide on both sides, and so they are only weakly held together by van der Waals forces. If these layers are aligned with each other a 1T- form results with a small c measurement on the unit cell. In some compounds the layers are not quite aligned, but repeat after three layers giving a 3R form, with a larger c unit cell height. Where the layers align, the crystal system is trigonal. But if the layers never quite align at any height, a monoclinic crystal results. The C_{2} unit sits at an angle to the layers, and thus reduces symmetry compared to compounds with single carbon atoms in the cluster.

In R_{2}CBr there are layers of R_{6}C that share bromide between layers.

== List ==
formula	system	space group	unit cell	volume	density	comment	reference
Sc_{7}CBr_{12}	trigonal	R3	a=13.628, c=9.203		4.33		
Y_{2}CBr_{2}	trigonal	R3̅m	a=3.7545, c=29.125		4.90	bronze	
Y_{2}C_{2}Br_{2}	monoclinic	C12/m1	a=6.953, b=3.764, c=9.938, β=99.98		3.85	superconductor Tc=5.04K	
Y_{2}C_{0.7}Br_{2}	trigonal	P3̅m1	a=3.73 c=9.864		4.83	grey	
Y_{10}Br_{18}(C_{2})_{2}	monoclinic	P2_{1}/n	a=9.729 b=16.323 c=13.229 β =121.131° Z=24	1798.3		black	
Na_{0.23}Y_{2}C_{2}Br_{2}	monoclinic	C2/m	a=7.061, b=3.724, c=10.464, β=92.96		4.43	copper red	
Zr_{6}CBr_{14}	orthorhombic	Cmce	a=14.69 b=13.229 c=11.991				
NaZr_{6}CBr_{14}	orthorhombic	Cmca	a=14.6876, b=13.2266, c=11.9864				
K_{4}Zr_{6}Br_{18}C	triclinic	P1	a=10.114, b=10.283, c=10.374, α=118.54, β=99.98, γ=104.08, Z=1				
RbZr_{6}CBr_{14}	orthorhombic	Cmca	a=14.719, b=13.287, c=12.043				
Cs_{2}Zr_{6}Br_{10}C	trigonal	R3̅c	a=13.0862 c=35.823 Z=6	5312.8			
CsZr_{6}Br_{9}C	trigonal	R3̅c	a=13.1031 c=35.800 Z=6	5321.5			
Cs_{3}Zr_{6}Br_{15}C	trigonal	R3̅c	a=13.116 c=35.980 Z=6				
Cs_{4}Zr_{6}Br_{15}C	trigonal	R3̅c	a=13.098 c=35.756 Z=6	5312			
La_{2}C_{2}Br	monoclinic	C12/c1	a=15.313, b=4.193, c=6.842, β=100.53,90		5.87		
La_{3}CBr_{5}	monoclinic	C12/c1	a=14.234, b=10.858, c=14.588, β =106.8		5.10	yellow	
La_{3}C2Br_{3}	orthorhombic	C222_{1}	a=11.533, b=17.0698, c=17.054		5.38	bronze	
La_{4}C_{2}Br_{5}	orthorhombic	Immm	a = 3.9950, b = 8.277, c = 18.101		5.43	black	
La_{5}C_{2}Br_{9}	orthorhombic	Pnma	a=11.309, b=9.9477, c=16.4911		5.15	red	
La_{5}C_{6}Br_{3}	monoclinic	C12/m1	a=22.809, b=3.9855, c=16.599, β=123.32		5.30	bronze	
La_{6}C_{2}Br_{9}	monoclinic	C2/c	a=14,234 b=10.858 c=14.588 β=106.80 Z=4	2158.4	4.85	yellow insulator	
La_{10}(C_{2})_{6}Br_{6}	monoclinic	C2/m	a = 22.809, b = 3.9855, c = 16.599, β = 123.32° Z=2	1260.9	5.301	bronze; air sensitive	
La_{3}Br_{2}C_{2}B		Pnma	f =15.323, b = 3.973, c =11.567			black	
Ce_{2}C_{2}Br	monoclinic	C2/c	a = 15.120, b = 4.179, c = 6.743, β = 101.09 °				
Ce_{4}CBr_{5}	monoclinic	C2/m	a = 18.306, b = 3.9735, c = 8.378, β=104.91°				
Ce_{4}C_{1.5}Br_{5}	monoclinic	C2/m	a = 18.996, b = 3.9310, c = 8.282, β = 106.74°				
Ce_{4}C_{2}Br_{5}	orthorhombic	Immm	a = 3.9835, b = 8.186, c = 18.017		5.54	violet	
Ce_{4}Br_{3}C_{4}	triclinic	P 1	a = 4.227, b = 11.034, c = 11.268, α = 77.15°, β = 90.13° and γ = 84.42°				
Ce_{10}(C_{2})_{6}Br_{6}	monoclinic	C2/m	a = 22.483, b = 3.9253, c = 16.375, β = 123.15° Z=2	1209.9	5.558	bronze; air sensitive	
Ce_{6}Br_{3}C_{3}B_{2}	monoclinic	P2_{1}/m	a = 8.602, b = 3.829, c = 10.220, β = 112.53			black	
Pr_{2}CBr	hexagonal	P6_{3}/mmc	a=3.8071, c=14.7787		6.69	black	
Pr_{2}C_{2}Br	monoclinic	C12/c1	a=15.054, b=4.139, c=6.713, β=101.08		6.24		
Pr_{3}CBr_{3}	cubic	I4_{1}31	a=11.61		5.73		
Pr_{3}CBr_{5}	triclinic	P1̅	a=7.571, b=9.004, c=9.062, α=108.57, β=97.77, γ=106.28		5.09	black	
Pr_{4}C_{1.3}Br_{5}	monoclinic	C2/m	a = 18.467, b = 3.911, c = 8.258, β = 105.25°				
Pr_{4}C_{1.5}Br_{5}	monoclinic	C2/m	a = 19.044, b = 3.9368, c = 8.254, β = 106.48°				
Pr_{5}C_{2}Br_{8}	triclinic	P1̅	a=9.096, b=12.185, c=16.688, α=79.57, β=89.86, γ=84.38		5.02	black	
Pr_{5}C_{2}Br_{9}	monoclinic	P2_{1}/n	a = 10.069; b = 18.861; c = 10.459; β = 108.130° Z = 4		5.09	dark red	
Pr5C_{6}Br_{3}	monoclinic	C12/m1	a=22.36, b=3.895, c=16.269, β=90,123.44		5,71		
Pr_{6}C_{2}Br_{10}	triclinic	P1̅	a=7.571 b=9.004 c=9.062 α=108.57° β=97.77° γ=106.28° Z=1	544.8	5.09	black	
Pr_{7}C_{3}Br_{10}			a=9.054, b=11.1265, c=13.352, α=79.641, β=72.57, γ=64.67		5.22	black	
Pr_{10}C_{4}Br_{15}	triclinic	P1̅	a=9.098 b=10.127 c=10.965 α=70.38° β=66.31° γ=70.84° Z=1	849.3	5.19	silver	
Pr_{10}(C_{2})_{2}Br_{16}	triclinic	P1̅	a = 9.096, b = 12.185, c = 16.688, α = 79.57°, β = 89.86°, γ = 84.38°			metallic black	
Pr_{10}(C_{2})_{6}Br_{6}	monoclinic	C2/m	a = 22.36, b = 3.895, c = 16.269, β = 123.44° Z=2			bronze; air sensitive	
Pr_{14}C_{6}Br_{20}	triclinic	P1̅	a=9.098 b=10.935 c=13.352 α=86.27° β=75.57° γ=66.88° Z=1	1157.8	5.23	black	
Pr_{6}C_{2}Cl_{5}Br_{5}	monoclinic	C2/c	a = 13.689(1) Å, b = 10.383(1) Å, c = 14.089(1) Å, β = 106.49(1)°			yellow to green	
Gd_{2}CBr	hexagonal	P6_{3}/mmc	a=3.7858, c=14.209		7.65	dark grey	
Gd_{2}Br_{2}C	trigonal	P3̅m1	a=3.8209, c=9.824			black	
3s-Gd_{2}C_{2}Br_{2}	monoclinic	C2/m	a = 7.066, b = 3.827, c = 9.967, β = 99.95°		5.69	black; contains C_{2}^{4−}	
Gd_{2}C_{2}Br_{2}	monoclinic	C2/m	a=7.025, b=3.8361, c=9.868, β =94.47		6.24	gold	
Gd_{4}C_{2}Br_{3}	orthorhombic	Pnma	a = 10.844, b = 3.730, c = 20.361		6.58	bronze	
Gd_{10}C_{4}Br_{18}	monoclinic	P2_{1}/n	a=9.7406 b=16.4817 c=11.8604 β =104.394° Z=24			contains C_{2}^{4−}	
Gd_{10}(C_{2})_{6}Br_{6}	monoclinic	C2/m	a = 21.507, b = 3.7193, c = 15.331, β = 123.34° Z=2	1024.5	6.254	bronze; air sensitive	
Gd_{4}Br_{3}C_{2}B	monoclinic	P2_{1}/m	a=9.547, b=3.693, c=12.44,5, β=106.68			black	
K_{2}[Gd_{10}(C_{2})_{2}]Br_{19}	orthorhombic	Pbcn	a=12.751, b=23.17, c=14.423		5.01	black	
K_{2}[Gd_{10}(C_{2})_{2}]Br_{20}	orthorhombic	Pbca	a=1.2751, b=2.317, c=1.4423		4.70	black	
Rb_{2}[Gd_{10}(C_{2})_{2}]Br_{19}	orthorhombic	Pbcn	a=1.2737, b=2.325, c=1.4412		5.15	black	
Cs_{2}[Gd_{10}(C_{2})_{2}]Br_{19}	orthorhombic						
TbCBr	monolinic	C12/m1	a=7.015, b=3.801, c=9.948, β=100.05		6.28		
Tb_{2}CBr	hexagonal	P6_{3}/mmc	a=3.6915, c=14.043		8.21		
Tb_{2}CBrH	hexagonal	P6_{3}mc	a=3.7376, c=14.315		7.88		
Tb_{4}C_{2}Br_{3}	orthorhombic	Pnma	a = 10.743, b = 3.706, c = 20.194		7.31	bronze	
Tb_{10}Br_{18}(C_{2})_{2}	monolinic	P12_{1}/c1	a=9.7562 b=16.4254 c=13.3043 β =120.675°	1833.7	5.57	dark red	
Rb_{2}[Tb_{10}(C_{2})_{2}]Br_{19}	orthorhombic		a=1.2664, b=2.3105, c=1.4303			black	
Dy_{10}Br_{18}(C_{2})_{2}	monolinic	P2_{1}/c	a = 9.740 b = 16.340 c = 13.247 β = 120.869° Z = 2	1809.6		black	
Ho_{10}Br_{18}(C_{2})_{2}	monolinic	P2_{1}/n	a=9.6838 b=16.2436 c=11.6374 β =104.427° Z=24	1772.8			
[Er_{10}(C_{2})_{2}]Br_{18}	monoclinic	P2_{1}/n	a = 9.718, b = 16.234, c = 11.638, β = 104.00°; Z = 2		5.89	black	
Lu_{2}CBr_{2}	trigonal	R3̅m	a= 3.6663, c=28.799		7.75	gold	
La_{0.9}Lu_{0.1}CBr	monoclinic	C2/m	a=7.434, b=4.0568, c=10.046, β=93.7		5.15		
W_{30}C_{2}(Cl,Br)_{68}	triclinic	P1̅	a = 12.003, b = 14.862, c = 15.792, α = 88.75°, β = 68.85°, γ = 71.19° Z=1	2472.9	6.35	black	
Th_{6}CBr_{15}	orthorhombic	Cmce	a=15.764, b=14.16, c=13.124		5.72	green	
Y_{0.8}Th_{0.2}CBr	monoclinic	C2/m	a=7.061, b=3.776, c=9.983, β=100.36		5.31		
