= Luxgen S5 =

Compact sedan

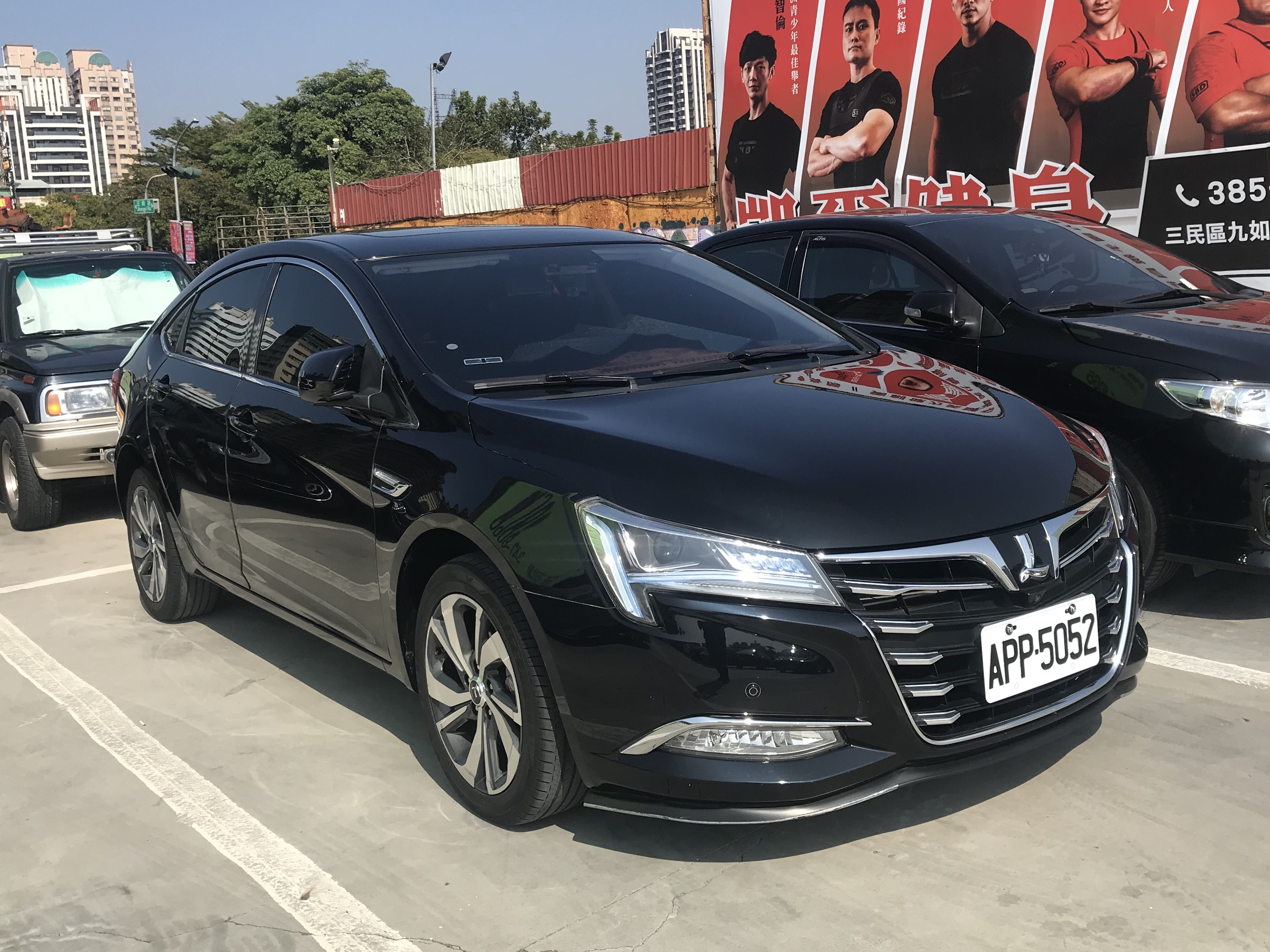

Overview
- Manufacturer: Luxgen
- Also called: Luxgen 5 Sedan (2012–2013); Luxgen S5 Turbo Eco Hyper (2013–2019); Luxgen S5 GT/GT225 (2019–2020)
- Production: 2012–2020
- Assembly: Taiwan: Miaoli; China: Hangzhou (Dongfeng Yulon)
- Designer: James C. Shyr

Body and chassis
- Class: Compact car (C)
- Body style: 4-door sedan
- Layout: Front-engine, front-wheel-drive
- Related: Luxgen U6

Powertrain
- Engine: Petrol: 1.8 L I4 turbo; 2.0 L I4 turbo
- Power output: 128 kW (172 hp; 174 PS) (1.8 L); 142 kW (190 hp; 193 PS) (2.0 L)
- Transmission: 6-speed Aisin manumatic

Dimensions
- Wheelbase: 2,720 mm (107.1 in)
- Length: 4,690 mm (184.6 in)
- Width: 1,805 mm (71.1 in)
- Height: 1,490 mm (58.7 in)
- Curb weight: 1,390–1,410 kg (3,060–3,110 lb)

The Luxgen S5, formerly known as the Luxgen5 Sedan, is a 5-seater compact sedan produced by the Taiwanese car company Luxgen.

== Overview ==
The S5 is the first car developed entirely in Taiwan. It was styled by the Hua-chuang Automobile Information Technical Center (HAITEC) and its design center led by James C. Shyr. It was unveiled in November 2011 as the electric concept car Neora at the Taipei Auto Show, officially launching in the second quarter of 2012. Luxgen5 Sedan is the first sedan of Luxgen series. It has a 1.8-liter turbo charged petrol engine or a 2.0-liter 4-cylinder turbo charged petrol engine giving 191 hp hp/28 kgm (2.0 L) and 171 hp hp/27.1 kgm (1.8 L). It also has Think+ and Eagle View features for night-vision and 360 degrees vision. The starting price is around $23,000.

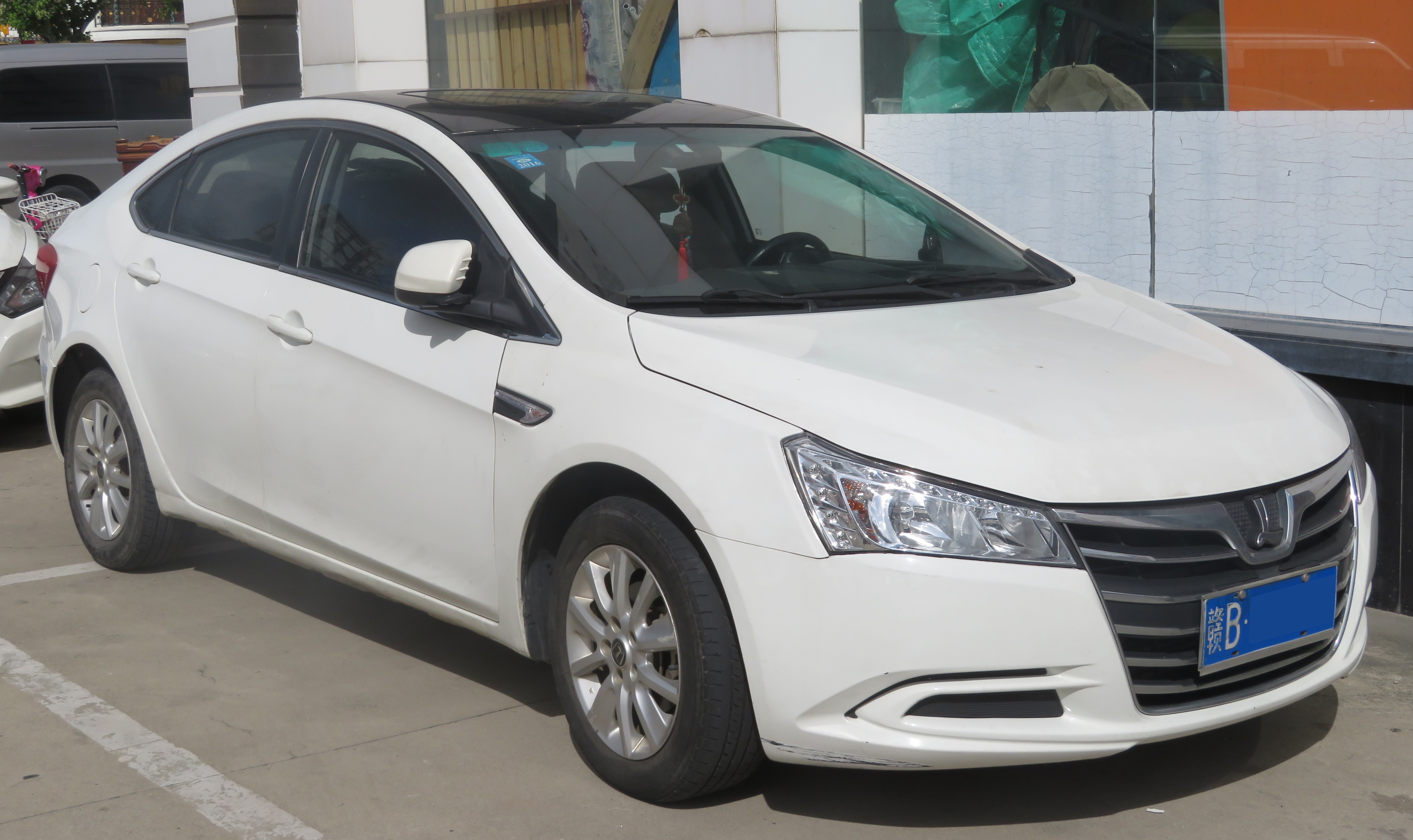
Luxgen 5 sedan pre-facelift front

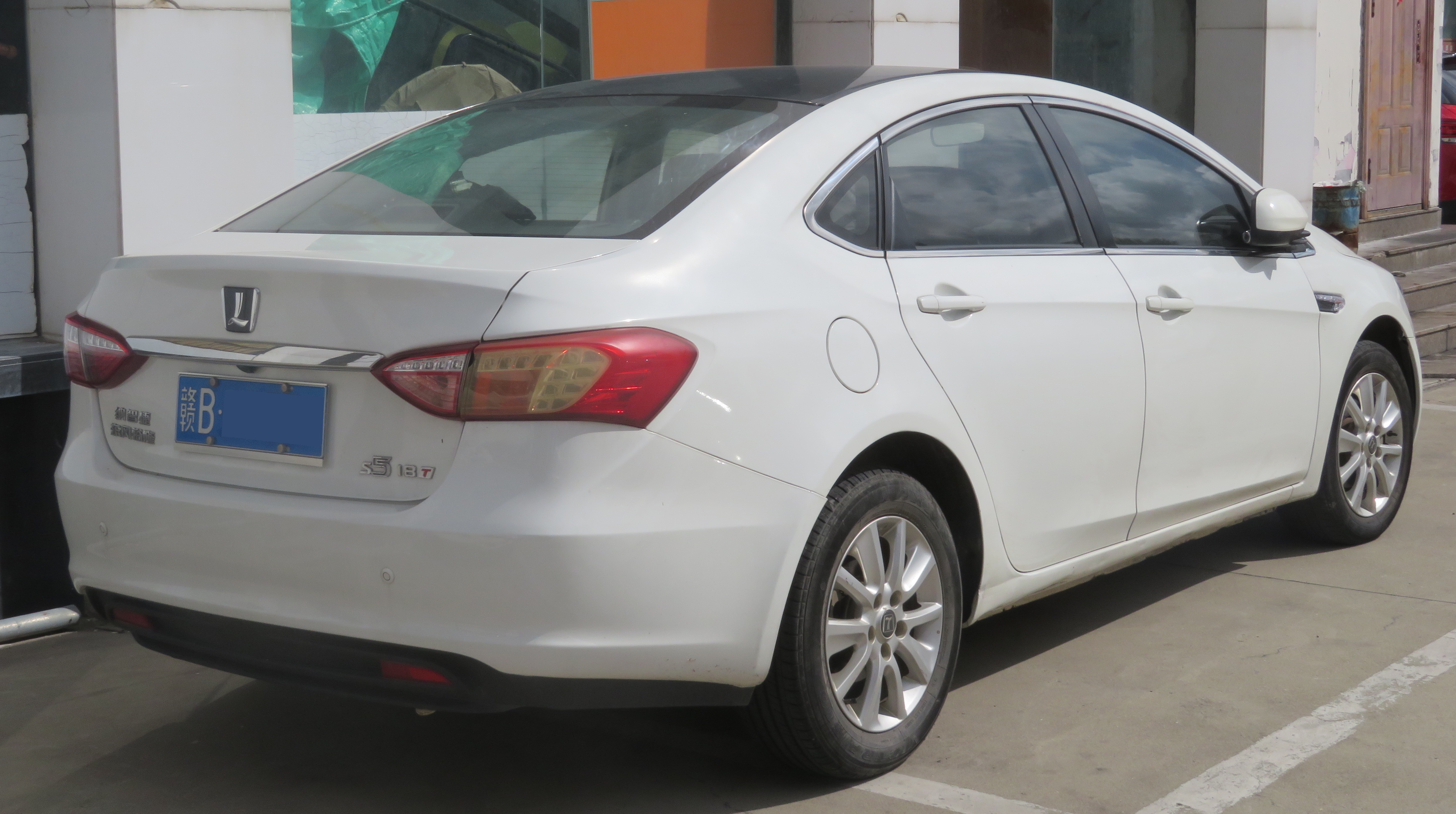
Luxgen 5 sedan pre-facelift rear
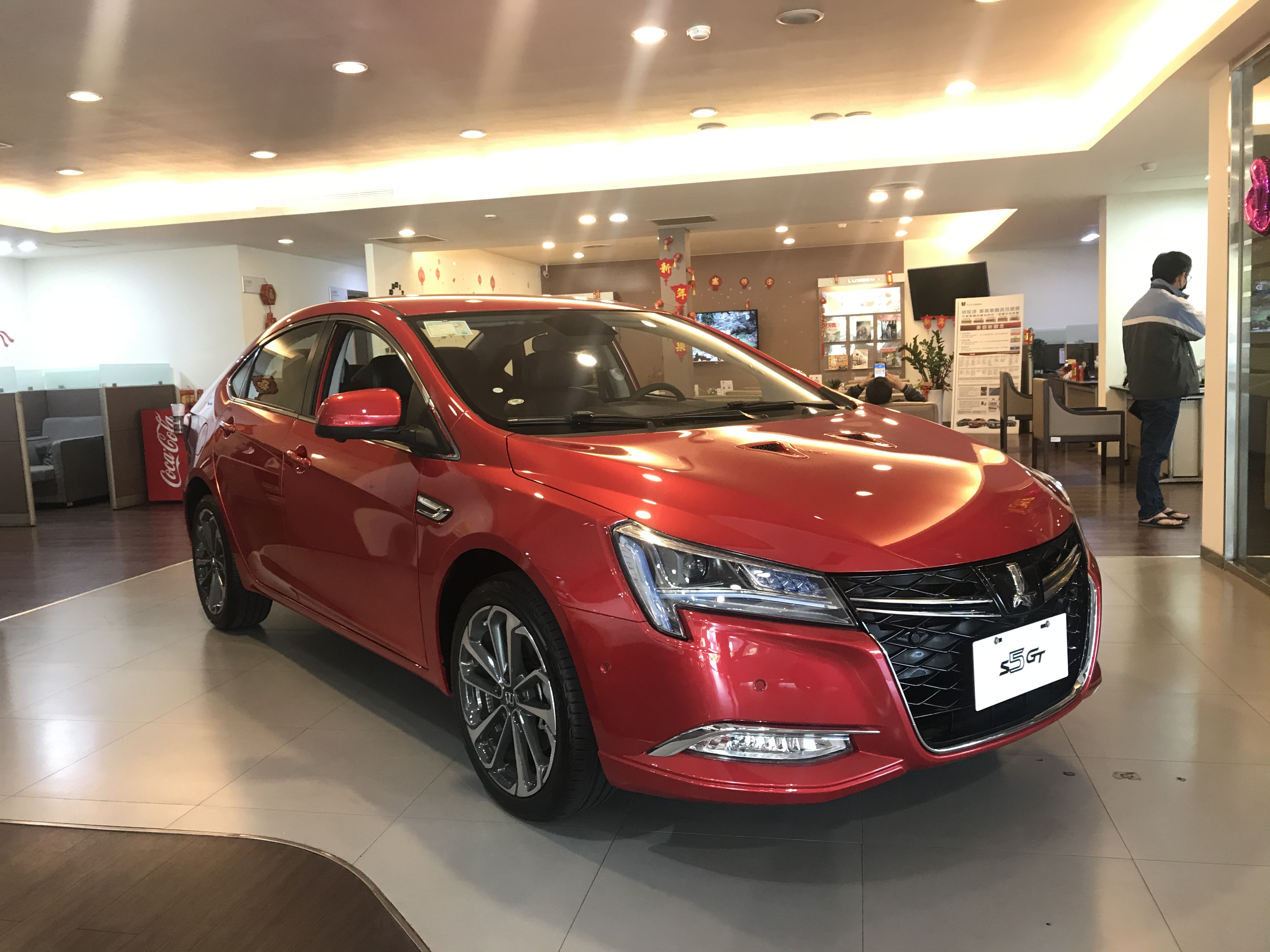
Luxgen S5 GT sedan front

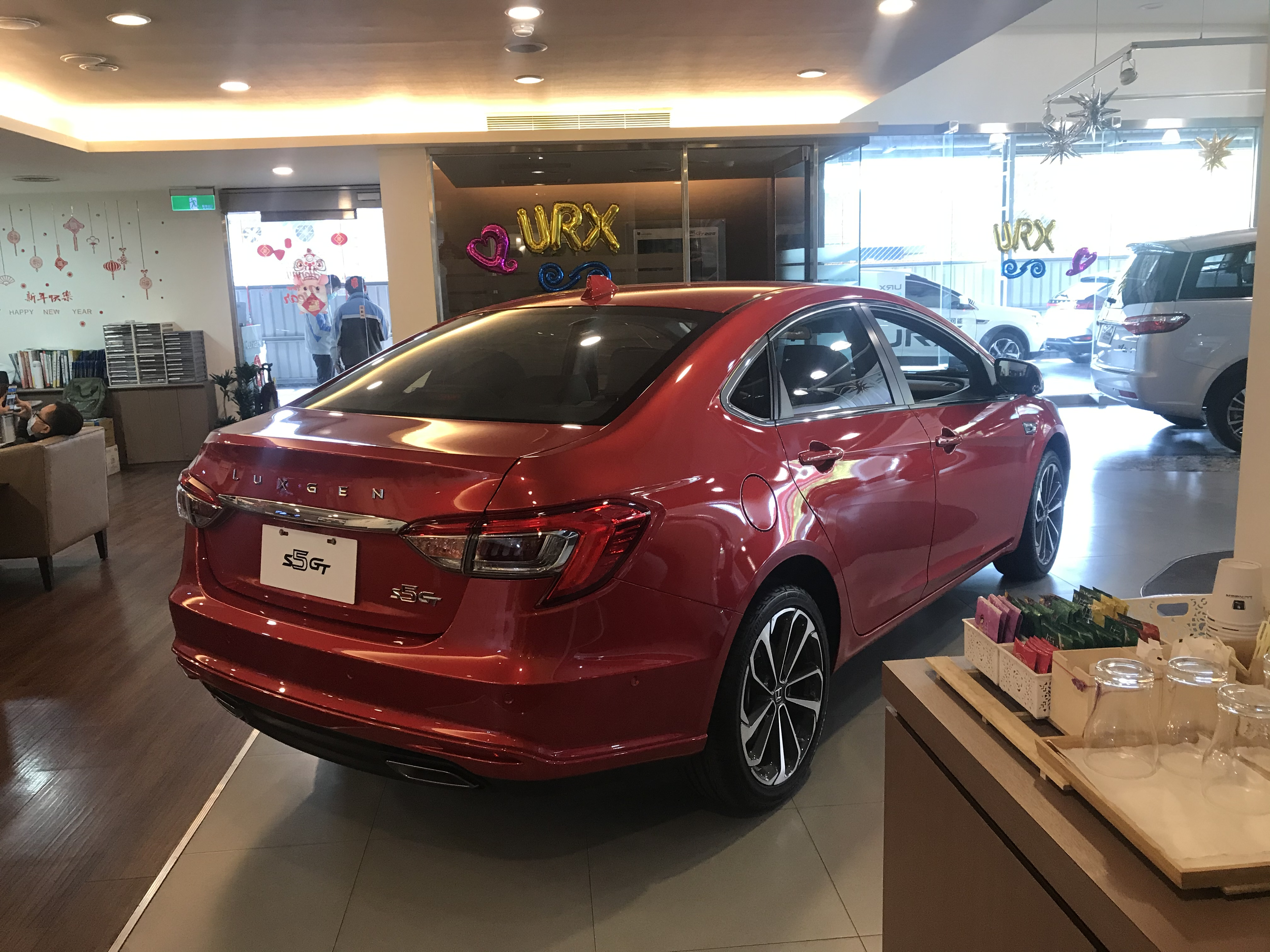
Luxgen S5 GT sedan rear
