= S3 Safe Sex Store =

- Company type: Corporation
- Founded: April 1995
- Headquarters: 1209 South University Ave., Ann Arbor, Michigan
- Key people: BethAnn Karmeisool, president /owner
- Products: Sexual health products, information and education, HIV testing and counseling
- Parent: BAK, INC.
- Website: s3safesexstore.com

S3 Safe Sex Store (also referred to as "S3") is the assumed name of the Michigan corporation, BAK, INC. The business offers sexual health products, sexual health information and education, free HIV testing and counseling. Community outreach is offered through an affiliated nonprofit entity of BAK, INC. called, SHARE (Sexual Health and Responsible Education).

S3 Safe Sex Store was founded April 11, 1995 by BethAnn Karmeisool to provide products that help reduce the risk of sexually transmitted diseases and infections, and unintended pregnancies in a retail environment while promoting education. In 2012, the store was approved as an HIV testing center by the Michigan Department of Community Health.

The corporation operated a brick-and-mortar retail store located in Ann Arbor, Michigan until late 2015, as well as online retail and dissemination of sexual health information and resources. Karmeisool cited issues such as rising rent prices in Ann Arbor and the negative influence of Amazon on her sales as key factors in her decision to close.

== History ==
BAK, INC. was founded April 11, 1995, by BethAnn Karmeisool, operating as S3 Safe Sex Store at 108 West 4th Street, Royal Oak MI. The store launched with community support and focused on the message of prevention and sexual health education. The business hosted the band, Spearhead, to perform its song, “Positive,” from the 1994 album, Home. The song written by Michael Franti, explores the possibility of contracting HIV and illustrated the mission of the newly opened S3.

In 1996, S3 moved to 314 W 4th St, Royal Oak, MI and briefly operated as Safety, Scents and Satins. By November 14, 1996, BAK, INC. had purchased the corporation, Condomwise Ltd., which operated one retail location in East Lansing, MI and one in Ann Arbor, MI under the assumed name, Condoms 101. BAK, INC. halted all operations of Condomwise Ltd. and restructured the East Lansing and Ann Arbor locations to operate as S3 Safe Sex Store, following the mission and vision of its flagship Royal Oak store.

In 1998, BAK INC. closed the East Lansing and Royal Oak locations and consolidated all operations to the 1209 South University Ave., Ann Arbor MI location. The store began offering onsite HIV testing services in 2010, in cooperation with the HIV/AIDS Resource Center (HARC). In 2012, the location became approved as an HIV testing center by the Michigan Department of Community Health.

In 2014, BAK, INC. published the book, Knotty Time! A BDSM Safety Guide, written by S3 Safe Sex Store employee, Alex Champagne, MSW.

SHARE (Sexual Health and Responsible Education), an affiliated nonprofit corporation of BAK, INC., obtained nonprofit corporate status from the State of Michigan on October 10, 2014.

== Staff ==
Staff are required to obtain the State of Michigan HIV Test Counselor Certification through the Department of Community Health; the process is paid for by the company. Owner BethAnn Karmeisool obtained a Master of Public Health degree in Health Behavior and Health Education from the University of Michigan Ann Arbor in 2009. Employees have traditionally had previous or ongoing educational or professional experience in social work, public health, sociology, justice policy, human development & family studies and HIV/AIDS support efforts.

Reviews and reports have consistently indicated S3 Safe Sex Store employees to be friendly, helpful and informative. As reported in a 2014 Michigan Daily article, “They will help anyone, no matter their gender identity, race, sexual orientation, religion or how much money they can spend, because they want us all to be happy, healthy sexual beings.” The company has always included a “store dog” as a stress reduction companion for those who may be experiencing anxiety regarding sexual health related issues. Companions include cockapoo-terrier mix “Pookie” (1995 - 1998), yellow Labrador “Jasmine” (1997 - 2012) and yellow Labrador “Jake” (2012–present).

== Products and Services ==
The company retails sexual health products, such as condoms, lubrication, mastibatory aids, and some novelties. Seminars are offered through its nonprofit entity, SHARE (Sexual Health and Responsible Education). Educational materials include proprietary instructional information and proprietary product analysis. Services include free weekly HIV testing and counseling. S3 is listed as an HIV testing location at the Centers for Disease Control and Prevention, Get Tested website. The company has taken steps to discontinue products containing phthalates.

S3 Safe Sex Store states that is services, “all people regardless of age, race, religion or sexual orientation a safe place that provides correct, consistent sexual health information.” The company has been reported to be “female friendly”, with a 2008 Michigan Daily article quoting an S3 employing stating, “We want to empower women with sexual information rather than repressing them. We want to make them confident.”

A 2009 Michigan Daily article was reposted at Feministing.com, and stated, “The Safe Sex Store in Ann Arbor provides an excellent model for sexual aids and toys that promote positive health outcomes for men and women. Undoubtedly, this result is a feminist one.”

S3 is noted as a resource for sexual health by the University of Michigan, University Health Service (UHS), Emory University's Office of Health Promotion and the University of Texas at Austin's Sexual Psychophysiology Laboratory.

== Nonprofit and Charity ==
S3 Safe Sex Store supports local and national agencies through monetary, product, and time donations. S3 has hosted fundraising events, such as Aphrodisia, which solely benefit charitable partners and non-affiliated beneficiaries. Notable charitable partners and beneficiaries include the HIV/AIDS Resource Center (HARC), AIDS Partnership Michigan, Planned Parenthood and the Midwest AIDS Prevention Project (M.A.P.P.).

SHARE (Sexual Health and Responsible Education) is an affiliated nonprofit corporation of BAK, INC. The organization’s website states, “The goal of SHARE is to re-teach the idea of sex ed and make each person responsible for his or her actions relating to sexual health.” Owner BethAnn Karmeisool, MPH teaches all seminars.
