= Supersonic gas separation =

Technique to remove component substances from a gaseous mixture

Supersonic gas separation is a technology to remove one or several gaseous components out of a mixed gas (typically raw natural gas). The process condensates the target components by cooling the gas through expansion in a Laval nozzle and then separates the condensates from the dried gas through an integrated cyclonic gas/liquid separator. The separator is only using a part of the field pressure as energy and has technical and commercial advantages when compared to commonly used conventional technologies.

== Background ==
Raw natural gas out of a well is usually not a salable product but a mix of various hydro-carbonic gases with other gases, liquids and solid contaminants. This raw gas needs gas conditioning to get it ready for pipeline transport and processing in a gas processing plant to separate it into its components.
Some of the common processing steps are CO_{2} removal, dehydration, LPG extraction, dew-pointing. Technologies used to achieve these steps are adsorption, absorption, membranes and low temperature systems achieved by refrigeration or expansion through a Joule Thomson Valve or a Turboexpander. If such expansion is done through the Supersonic Gas Separator instead, frequently mechanical, economical and operational advantages can be gained as detailed below.

== The supersonic gas separator ==
A supersonic gas separator consists of several consecutive sections in tubular form, usually designed as flanged pieces of pipe.

The feed gas (consisting of at least two components) first enters a section with an arrangement of static blades or wings, which induce a fast swirl in the gas. Thereafter the gas stream flows through a Laval nozzle, where it accelerates to supersonic speeds and undergoes a deep pressure drop to about 30% of feed pressure. This is a near isentropic process and the corresponding temperature reduction leads to condensation of target components of the mixed feed gas, which form a fine mist. The droplets agglomerate to larger drops, and the swirl of the gas causes cyclonic separation. The dry gas continues forward, while the liquid phase together with some slip gas (about 30% of the total stream) is separated by a concentric divider and exits the device as a separate stream. The final section are diffusers for both streams, where the gas is slowed down and about 80% of the feed pressure (depending on application) is recovered. This section might also include another set of static devices to undo the swirling motion.

== The installation scheme ==
The supersonic separator requires a certain process scheme, which includes further auxiliary equipment and often forms a skid or processing block. The typical basic scheme for supersonic separation is an arrangement where the feed gas is pre-cooled in a heat exchanger by the dry stream of the separator unit.

The liquid phase from the supersonic separator goes into a 2-phase or 3-phase separator, where the slip gas is separated from water and/or from liquid hydrocarbons. The gaseous phase of this secondary separator joins the dry gas of the supersonic separator, the liquids go for transport, storage or further processing and the water for treatment and disposal.

Depending on the task at hand other schemes are possible and for certain cases have advantages. Those variations are very much part of the supersonic gas separation process to achieve thermodynamic efficiency and several of them are protected by patents.

== Advantages and application ==
The supersonic gas separator recovers part of the pressure drop needed for cooling and as such has a higher efficiency than a JT valve in all conditions of operation.

The supersonic gas separator can in many cases have a 10–20% higher efficiency than a turboexpander.

The supersonic separator has a smaller footprint and a lower weight than a turboexpander or contactor columns. This is of particular advantage for platforms, FPSOs and crowded installations. It needs a lower capital investment and lower operating expenditure as it is completely static. Very little maintenance is required and no (or greatly reduced) amounts of chemicals.

The fact that no operational or maintenance personnel is required might enable decrewing of usually crewed platforms with the associated large savings in capital and operational expenditure.

The fields of application commercially developed until today on an industrial scale are:

- dehydration
- dewpointing (water and/or hydrocarbons)
- LPG extraction

Applications in the development stage for near term commercialization are:

- CO_{2} and H_{2}S bulk removal

== Commercial realization ==
There are several patents on supersonic gas separation, relating to features of the device as well as methods. The technology has been researched and proven in laboratory installations since about 1998, special HYSYS modules have been developed as well as 3D gas computer modeling. The supersonic gas separation technology has meanwhile moved successfully into industrial applications (e.g. in Nigeria, Malaysia and Russia) for dehydration as well as for LPG extraction. Consultancy, engineering and equipment for supersonic gas separation are being offered by ENGO Engineering Ltd. under the brand "3S". They are also provided by Twister BV, a Dutch firm affiliated with Royal Dutch Shell, under the brand "Twister Supersonic Separator". The official licensee of the supersonic gas separation technology under the "3S" brand is the European company M-ost Ltd.
