= Nanocluster =

Collection of bound atoms or molecules

Nanoclusters are atomically precise, crystalline materials in the 0–2 nanometer size scale. They are often kinetically stable intermediates that form during the synthesis of comparatively larger materials such as semiconductor and metallic nanocrystals. The majority of research conducted to study nanoclusters has focused on characterizing their crystal structures and understanding their role in the nucleation and growth mechanisms of larger materials.

Materials can be categorized into three different regimes, namely bulk, nanoparticles and nanoclusters. Bulk metals are electrical conductors and good optical reflectors and metal nanoparticles display intense colors due to surface plasmon resonance. However, when the size of metal nanoclusters is further reduced to form a nanocluster, the band structure becomes discontinuous and breaks down into discrete energy levels, somewhat similar to the energy levels of molecules. This gives nanoclusters similar qualities as a singular molecule nanoclusters are known as the bridging link between atoms and nanoparticles. Nanoclusters may also be referred to as molecular nanoparticles.

== History of nanoclusters ==
The formation of stable nanoclusters such as Buckminsterfullerene (C_{60}) has been suggested to have occurred during the early universe.

In retrospect, the first nanoclustered ions discovered were the Zintl phases, intermetallics studied in the 1930s.

The first set of experiments to consciously form nanoclusters can be traced back to 1950s and 1960s. During this period, nanoclusters were produced from intense molecular beams at low temperature by supersonic expansion. The development of laser vaporization technique made it possible to create nanoclusters of a clear majority of the elements in the periodic table. Since 1980s, there has been tremendous work on nanoclusters of semiconductor elements, compound clusters and transition metal nanoclusters.

Subnanometric metal clusters typically contain fewer than 10 atoms and measure less than one nanometer in size.

== Size and number of atoms in metal nanoclusters ==
According to the Japanese mathematical physicist Ryogo Kubo, the spacing of energy levels can be predicted by

$\delta=\frac{E_{\rm F}}{N}$

where E_{F} is Fermi energy and N is the number of atoms. For quantum confinement 𝛿 can be estimated to be equal to the thermal energy (δ = kT), where k is the Boltzmann constant and T is temperature.

== Stability ==
Not all the clusters are stable. The stability of nanoclusters depends on the number of atoms in the nanocluster, valence electron counts and encapsulating scaffolds. In the 1990s, Heer and his coworkers used supersonic expansion of an atomic cluster source into a vacuum in the presence of an inert gas and produced atomic cluster beams. Heer's team and Brack et al. discovered that certain masses of formed metal nanoclusters were stable and were like magic clusters. The number of atoms or size of the core of these magic clusters corresponds to the closing of atomic shells. Certain thiolated clusters such as Au25(SR)18, Au_{38}(SR)_{24}, Au_{102}(SR)_{44} and Au_{144}(SR)_{60} also showed magic number stability. Häkkinen et al explained this stability with a theory that a nanocluster is stable if the number of valence electrons corresponds to the shell closure of atomic orbitals as (1S^{2}, 1P^{6}, 1D^{10}, 2S^{2} 1F^{14}, 2P^{6} 1G^{18}, 2D^{10} 3S^{2} 1H^{22}.......).

== Synthesis and stabilization ==
=== Solid state medium ===
Molecular beams can be used to create nanocluster beams of virtually any element. They can be synthesized in high vacuum by with molecular beam techniques combined with a mass spectrometer for mass selection, separation and analysis. And finally detected with detectors.

==== Cluster Sources ====
Seeded supersonic nozzle Seeded supersonic nozzles are mostly used to create clusters of low-boiling-point metal. In this source method metal is vaporized in a hot oven. The metal vapor is mixed with (seeded in) inert carrier gas. The vapor mixture is ejected into a vacuum chamber via a small hole, producing a supersonic molecular beam. The expansion into vacuum proceeds adiabatically cooling the vapor. The cooled metal vapor becomes supersaturated, condensing in cluster form.

Gas aggregation Gas aggregation is mostly used to synthesize large clusters of nanoparticles. Metal is vaporized and introduced in a flow of cold inert gas, which causes the vapor to become highly supersaturated. Due to the low temperature of the inert gas, cluster production proceeds primarily by successive single-atom addition.

Laser vaporization Laser vaporization source can be used to create clusters of various size and polarity. Pulse laser is used to vaporize the target metal rod and the rod is moved in a spiral so that a fresh area can be evaporated every time. The evaporated metal vapor is cooled by using cold helium gas, which causes the cluster formation.

Pulsed arc cluster ion This is similar to laser vaporization, but an intense electric discharge is used to evaporate the target metal.

Ion sputtering Ion sputtering source produces an intense continuous beam of small singly ionized cluster of metals. Cluster ion beams are produced by bombarding the surface with high energetic inert gas (krypton and xenon) ions. The cluster production process is still not fully understood.

Liquid-metal ion In liquid-metal ion source a needle is wetted with the metal to be investigated. The metal is heated above the melting point and a potential difference is applied. A very high electric field at the tip of the needle causes a spray of small droplets to be emitted from the tip. Initially very hot and often multiply ionized droplets undergo evaporative cooling and fission to smaller clusters.

==== Mass Analyzer ====
Wein filter In Wien filter mass separation is done with crossed homogeneous electric and magnetic fields perpendicular to ionized cluster beam. The net force on a charged cluster with mass M, charge Q, and velocity v vanishes if E = Bv/c . The cluster ions are accelerated by a voltage V to an energy QV. Passing through the filter, clusters with M/Q = 2V/(Ec/B) are not deflected. These cluster ions that are not deflected are selected with appropriately positioned collimators.

Quadrupole mass filter The quadrupole mass filter operates on the principle that ion trajectories in a two-dimensional quadrupole field are stable if the field has an AC component superimposed on a DC component with appropriate amplitudes and frequencies. It is responsible for filtering sample ions based on their mass-to-charge ratio.

Time of flight mass spectroscopy Time-of-flight spectroscopy consists of an ion gun, a field-free drift space and an ion cluster source. The neutral clusters are ionized, typically using pulsed laser or an electron beam. The ion gun accelerates the ions that pass through the field-free drift space (flight tube) and ultimately impinge on an ion detector. Usually an oscilloscope records the arrival time of the ions. The mass is calculated from the measured time of flight.

Molecular beam chromatography In this method, cluster ions produced in a laser vaporized cluster source are mass selected and introduced in a long inert-gas-filled drift tube with an entrance and exit aperture. Since cluster mobility depends upon the collision rate with the inert gas, they are sensitive to the cluster shape and size.

=== Aqueous medium ===
In general, metal nanoclusters in an aqueous medium are synthesized in two steps: reduction of metal ions to zero-valent state and stabilization of nanoclusters. Without stabilization, metal nanoclusters would strongly interact with each other and aggregate irreversibly to form larger particles.

==== Reduction ====
There are several methods reported to reduce silver ion into zero-valent silver atoms:

- Chemical Reduction Chemical reductants can reduce silver ions into silver nanoclusters. Some examples of chemical reductants are sodium borohydride (NaBH_{4}) and sodium hypophosphite (NaPO_{2}H_{2}.H_{2}O). For instance, Dickson and his research team have synthesized silver nanoclusters in DNA using sodium borohydride.
- Electrochemical Reduction Silver nanoclusters can also be reduced electrochemically using reductants in the presence of stabilizing agents such as dodecanethiol and tetrabutylammonium.
- Photoreduction Silver nanoclusters can be produced using ultraviolet light, visible or infrared light. The photoreduction process has several advantages such as avoiding the introduction of impurities, fast synthesis, and controlled reduction. For example Diaz and his co-workers have used visible light to reduce silver ions into nanoclusters in the presence of a PMAA polymer. Kunwar et al produced silver nanoclusters using infrared light.
- Other reduction methods Silver nanoclusters are also formed by reducing silver ions with gamma rays, microwaves, or ultrasound. For example silver nanoclusters formed by gamma reduction technique in aqueous solutions that contain sodium polyacrylate or partly carboxylated polyacrylamide or glutaric acids. By irradiating microwaves Linja Li prepared fluorescent silver nanoclusters in PMAA, which typically possess a red color emission. Similarly Suslick et al. have synthesized silver nanoclusters using high ultrasound in the presence of PMAA polymer.

==== Stabilization ====
Cryogenic gas molecules are used as scaffolds for nanocluster synthesis in solid state. In aqueous medium there are two common methods for stabilizing nanoclusters: electrostatic (charge, or inorganic) stabilization and steric (organic) stabilization. Electrostatic stabilization occurs by the adsorption of ions to the often-electrophilic metal surface, which creates an electrical double layer. Thus, this Coulomb repulsion force between individual particles will not allow them to flow freely without agglomeration. Whereas on the other hand in steric stabilization, the metal center is surrounded by layers of sterically bulk material. These large adsorbates provide a steric barrier which prevents close contact of the metal particle centers.

Thiols Thiol-containing small molecules are the most commonly adopted stabilizers in metal nanoparticle synthesis owing to the strong interaction between thiols and gold and silver. Glutathione has been shown to be an excellent stabilizer for synthesizing gold nanoclusters with visible luminescence by reducing Au^{3+} in the presence of glutathione with sodium borohydride (NaBH_{4}). Also other thiols such as tiopronin, 2-phenylethanethiol, thiolated α-cyclodextrin and 3-mercaptopropionic acid and bidentate dihydrolipoic acid are other thiolated compounds currently being used in the synthesis of metal nanoclusters. The size as well as the luminescence efficiency of the nanocluster depends sensitively on the thiol-to-metal molar ratio. The higher the ratio, the smaller the nanoclusters. The thiol-stabilized nanoclusters can be produced using strong as well as mild reductants. Thioled metal nanoclusters are mostly produced using the strong reductant sodium borohydride (NaBH_{4}). Gold nanocluster synthesis can also be achieved using a mild reducant tetrakis(hydroxymethyl)phosphonium (THPC). Here a zwitterionic thiolate ligand, D-penicillamine (DPA), is used as the stabilizer. Furthermore, nanoclusters can be produced by etching larger nanoparticles with thiols. Thiols can be used to etch larger nanoparticles stabilized by other capping agents.

Dendrimers Dendrimers are used as templates to synthesize nanoclusters. Gold nanoclusters embedded in poly(amidoamine) dendrimer (PAMAM) have been successfully synthesized. PAMAM is repeatedly branched molecules with different generations. The fluorescence properties of the nanoclusters are sensitively dependent on the types of dendrimers used as template for the synthesis. Metal nanoclusters embedded in different templates show maximum emission at different wavelengths. The change in fluorescence property is mainly due to surface modification by the capping agents. Although gold nanoclusters embedded in PAMAM are blue-emitting the spectrum can be tuned from the ultraviolet to the near-infrared (NIR) region and the relative PAMAM/gold concentration and the dendrimer generation can be varied. The green-emitting gold nanoclusters can be synthesized by adding mercaptoundecanoic acid (MUA) into the prepared small gold nanoparticle solution. The addition of freshly reduced lipoic acid (DHLA) gold nanoclusters (AuNC@DHLA) become red-emitting fluorophores.

Polymers Polymers with abundant carboxylic acid groups were identified as promising templates for synthesizing highly fluorescent, water-soluble silver nanoclusters. Fluorescent silver nanoclusters have been successfully synthesized on poly(methacrylic acid), microgels of poly(N-isopropylacrylamide-acrylic acid-2-hydroxyethyl acrylate) polyglycerol-block-poly(acrylic acid) copolymers polyelectrolyte, poly(methacrylic acid) (PMAA) etc. Gold nanoclusters have been synthesized with polyethylenimine (PEI) and poly(N-vinylpyrrolidone) (PVP) templates. The linear polyacrylates, poly(methacrylic acid), act as an excellent scaffold for the preparation of silver nanoclusters in water solution by photoreduction. Poly(methacrylic acid)-stabilized nanoclusters have an excellent high quantum yield and can be transferred to other scaffolds or solvents and can sense the local environment.

DNA, proteins and peptides DNA oligonucleotides are good templates for synthesizing metal nanoclusters. Silver ions possess a high affinity to cytosine bases in single-stranded DNA which makes DNA a promising candidate for synthesizing small silver nanoclusters. The number of cytosines in the loop could tune the stability and fluorescence of Ag NCs. Biological macromolecules such as peptides and proteins have also been utilized as templates for synthesizing highly fluorescent metal nanoclusters. Compared with short peptides, large and complicated proteins possess abundant binding sites that can potentially bind and further reduce metal ions, thus offering better scaffolds for template-driven formation of small metal nanoclusters. Also the catalytic function of enzymes can be combined with the fluorescence property of metal nanoclusters in a single cluster to make it possible to construct multi-functional nanoprobes.

Inorganic scaffolds Inorganic materials like glass and zeolite are also used to synthesize the metal nanoclusters. Stabilization is mainly by immobilization of the clusters and thus preventing their tendency to aggregate to form larger nanoparticles. First metal ions doped glasses are prepared and later the metal ion doped glass is activated to form fluorescent nanoclusters by laser irradiation. In zeolites, the pores which are in the ångström size range can be loaded with metal ions and later activated either by heat treatment, UV light excitation, or two-photon excitation. During the activation, the silver ions combine to form the nanoclusters that can grow only to oligomeric size due to the limited cage dimensions.

== Properties ==
=== Magnetic properties ===
Most atoms in a nanocluster are surface atoms. Thus, it is expected that the magnetic moment of an atom in a cluster will be larger than that of one in a bulk material. Lower coordination, lower dimensionality, and increasing interatomic distance in metal clusters contribute to enhancement of the magnetic moment in nanoclusters. Metal nanoclusters also show change in magnetic properties. For example, vanadium and rhodium are paramagnetic in bulk but become ferromagnetic in nanoclusters. Also, manganese is antiferromagnetic in bulk but ferromagnetic in nanoclusters. A small nanocluster is a nanomagnet, which can be made nonmagnetic simply by changing its structure. So they can form the basis of a nanomagnetic switch.

=== Reactivity properties ===
Large surface-to-volume ratios and low coordination of surface atoms are primary reasons for the unique reactivity of nanoclusters. Thus, nanoclusters are widely used as catalysts. Gold nanoclusters are an excellent example of a catalysts. While bulk gold is chemically inert, it becomes highly reactive when scaled down to nanometer scale. One of the properties that govern cluster reactivity is electron affinity. Chlorine has highest electron affinity of any material in the periodic table. Clusters can have high electron affinity and nanoclusters with high electron affinity are classified as super halogens. Super halogens are metal atoms at the core surrounded by halogen atoms.

=== Optical properties ===
The optical properties of materials are determined by their electronic structure and band gap. The energy gap between the highest occupied molecular orbital and lowest unoccupied molecular orbital (HOMO/LUMO) varies with the size and composition of a nanocluster. Thus, the optical properties of nanoclusters change. Furthermore, the gaps can be modified by coating the nanoclusters with different ligands or surfactants. It is also possible to design nanoclusters with tailored band gaps and thus tailor optical properties by simply tuning the size and coating layer of the nanocluster.

== Applications ==
Nanoclusters potentially have many areas of application as they have unique optical, electrical, magnetic and reactivity properties. Nanoclusters are biocompatible, ultrasmall, and exhibit bright emission, hence promising candidates for fluorescence bio imaging or cellular labeling. Nanoclusters along with fluorophores are widely used for staining cells for study both in vitro and in vivo. Furthermore, nanoclusters can be used for sensing and detection applications. They are able to detect copper and mercury ions in an aqueous solution based on fluorescence quenching. Also many small molecules, biological entities such as biomolecules, proteins, DNA, and RNA can be detected using nanoclusters. The unique reactivity properties and the ability to control the size and number of atoms in nanoclusters have proven to be a valuable method for increasing activity and tuning the selectivity in a catalytic process. Also since nanoparticles are magnetic materials and can be embedded in glass these nanoclusters can be used in optical data storage that can be used for many years without any loss of data.
