= List of Nissan vehicles Yulon Motors has built under license =

This is a chronological list of Nissan vehicles assembled and built by Yue Loong (later Yulon). Dates given are of introduction to the market.

== 1960s ==
- Bluebird 210 – YLN 701, 1960.3–?.
- Bluebird 310 – YLN 704, 1963–1964.
- Bluebird 510 – YLN 706, ?–1972.
- Cedric 30 – YLN 801, 1960–1965.
- Cedric 130 – YLN 801A, 1965–1971.
- Bluebird 410 – YLN 705B, 1964–1965.
- 582 – YLN 101
- 681 – YLN 401A,?–1968.
- 690 – YLN 512
- C40 Caball - YLN 851
- C240 Caball - YLN 851B
- VC142 Caball- YLN 851-2

== 1970s ==
- Datsun 320 (Nissan E engine) – YLN 751.
- Datsun 520 (Nissan J engine) – YLN 751C.
- Datsun 620 (Nissan J engine) – YLN 752/753, 1973–1979.
- Cedric 230 – YLN 802 (H20 engine)
- Cedric 330 – YLN 803/805 (L24 engine), also available with SD22 diesel engine)
- Homer T20 – YLN 251(light truck with J16 engine)
- Homer F20 – YLN 253
- Laurel C230 – YLN 902 (L20 engine)
- Sunny B210 – YLN 301 (A12 engine)
- Sunny B310 (A12 engine) – YLN 302 (early version), 1979–1980.
- Violet 710 – YLN 707 (J16 engine), 1977–1979.
- Violet A10 – YLN 709/711/712 (4/5-door), 1979–?.

== 1980s ==
- Datsun 720 – YLN 755
- Bluebird 910 – YLN 911/912
- Bluebird U11 – YLN 921 (2.0)/923 (1.8)/923 W (1.8 wagon)
- Caravan E23 – YLN 747
- Cedric 430 – YLN 806/807
- Cedric Y30 – YLN 811/830 (CA20S/VG30E), 1984–1991.
- Homer F22 – YLN 255/256/261
- Stanza T11 – YLN 721 (4/5d)
- Sunny B310 (A12 engine) – YLN 303, 1981–1992.
- Sunny Truck – YLN 303T, 1983–1992.
- Sunny B11 – YLN 311 (4d/Wagon)
- Sunny B12 – YLN 321
- Vanette C120 – YLN 352/353

== 1990s ==
- AD Resort Y10 – YLN Y10
- Cabstar F23
- Cefiro A32 – YLN A32
- March K11 – YLN K11, 1993–2007.
- Primera P10 – YLN 931
- Sentra B13 – YLN 331
- Sentra B14 – YLN 341
- Vanette C22 – YLN 361
- Verita A retro styled car, bases on the March K11, 1997–2007.

== 2000s ==
- Cefiro A33
- Livina / Grand Livina L10
- Sentra 180/200/M1 based on the Bluebird Sylphy N16 – Yulon claimed that it designed this modification of the Almera/Pulsar, and that Nissan in Japan decided to take it up.
- Serena Q-RV longer wheelbase and body updated by Yulon
- Teana J31
- Tiida C11
- X-Trail T30
- Cabstar F24
- Teana J32
- Tiida C11

== 2010s ==
- Tiida C12
- March K13
- Sentra B17
- Livina L11
- X-Trail T32

== Now assembled in Taiwan ==
- Sentra B18
- Kicks P15
- X-Trail T33
