= Shuen =

Shuen may refer to:

- Shuen paper, also known as Xuan paper or Shuen paper or rice paper, is a kind of paper originating in ancient China used for writing and painting
- Shuen Wan, also known as Plover Cove or Shuen Wan Hoi, a cove in the Tai Po area of Hong Kong, near Tolo Channel and Tolo Harbour
- So Hung Shuen, also known as Soh Hang-suen, a former TVB actor
- Tang Shu Shuen (born 1941), former Hong Kong film director
- Wu Shuen-wen, also known as Vivian Shun-wen Wu, (1913–2008), prominent Taiwanese businesswoman

== See also ==
- Sho En
- Shuowen
- Shuwan
- Zhu Wen
