= Nissan Teana =

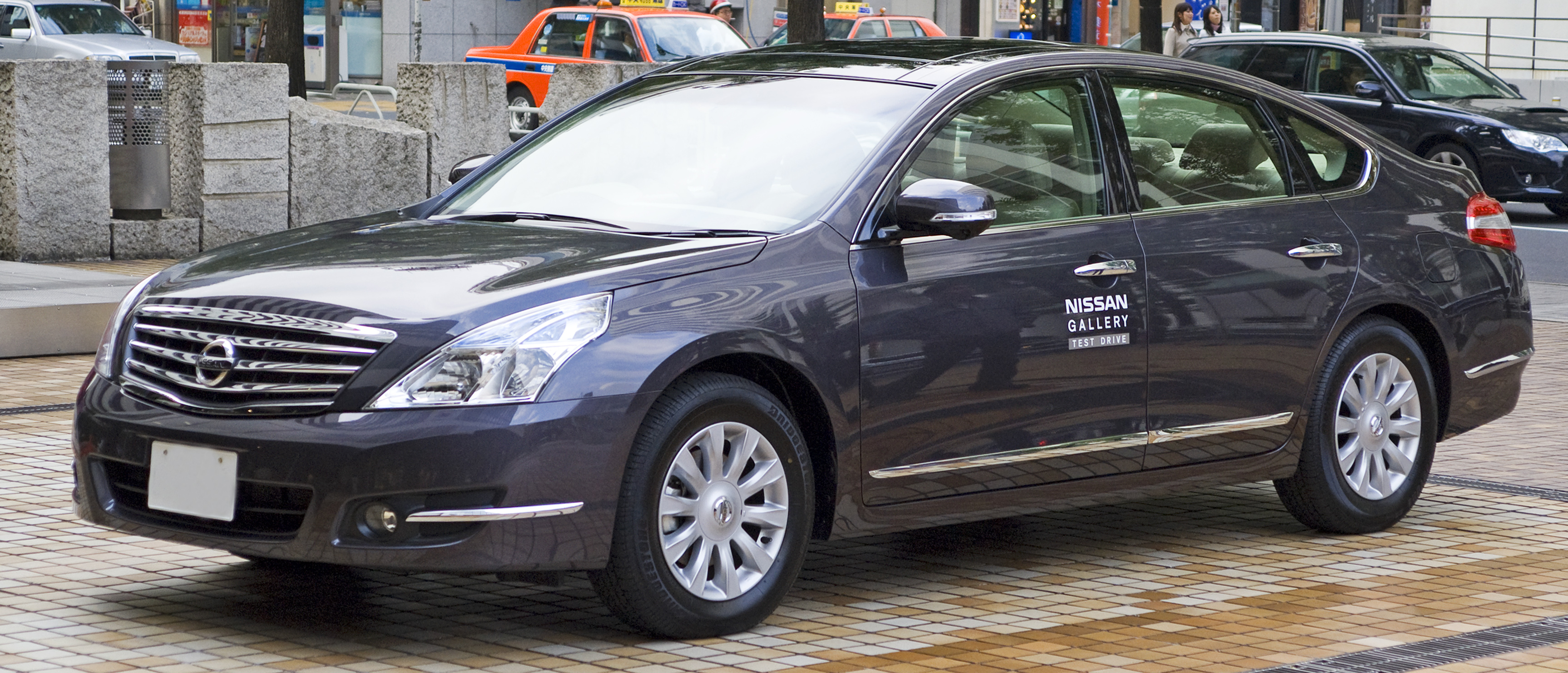
- 2008 Nissan Teana (J32)

Overview
- Manufacturer: Nissan
- Also called: Nissan Maxima (2003–2013); Nissan Cefiro (2003–2009); Nissan Altima (2013–2020, 2025–present)
- Production: 2003–2020; 2025–present

Body and chassis
- Class: Mid-size car
- Body style: 4-door sedan
- Layout: Front-engine, front-wheel-drive Front-engine, all-wheel-drive

Chronology
- Predecessor: Nissan Bluebird; Nissan Laurel; Nissan Cefiro; Nissan Maxima QX (Europe)
- Successor: Nissan Altima (L34) (2020–2025)

The Nissan Teana (Japanese: 日産・ティアナ, Hepburn: Nissan Tiana) is a mid-size sedan produced by Japanese automobile manufacturer Nissan. It was exported as the Nissan Maxima and Nissan Cefiro to certain markets. It replaces the Nissan Bluebird, Laurel and Cefiro. It shares a platform with the Nissan Maxima and Nissan Altima which are sold in North America, as well as the Japanese market Presage minivan. The Teana has been available in East Asia, Russia, Ukraine, South Asia, Southeast Asia, Australia, New Zealand, Latin America and the Caribbean.

As of 2007 the Teana shares its platform with its French cousin, the Renault Laguna and Renault Latitude in most of Europe, the Middle East and Africa, and in Southeast Asia as the Renault Samsung SM5.

With the introduction of the Teana, Nissan continued the J lineage for the model codes (J31 and J32) from the Nissan Maxima (J30). Starting with the introduction of the third generation in 2013, the Teana became a badge engineered version of the North American Altima. The Teana nameplate was temporarily retired in 2020, being replaced by the L34 Altima or discontinued without any successor in some markets. The nameplate returned in 2025 for the Chinese market.

The name "Teana" is from that of a small village in Italy, sharing a naming influence for the Nissan Murano which was released in the same era, which was named after another city in Italy.

== First generation (J31; 2003) ==
First generation
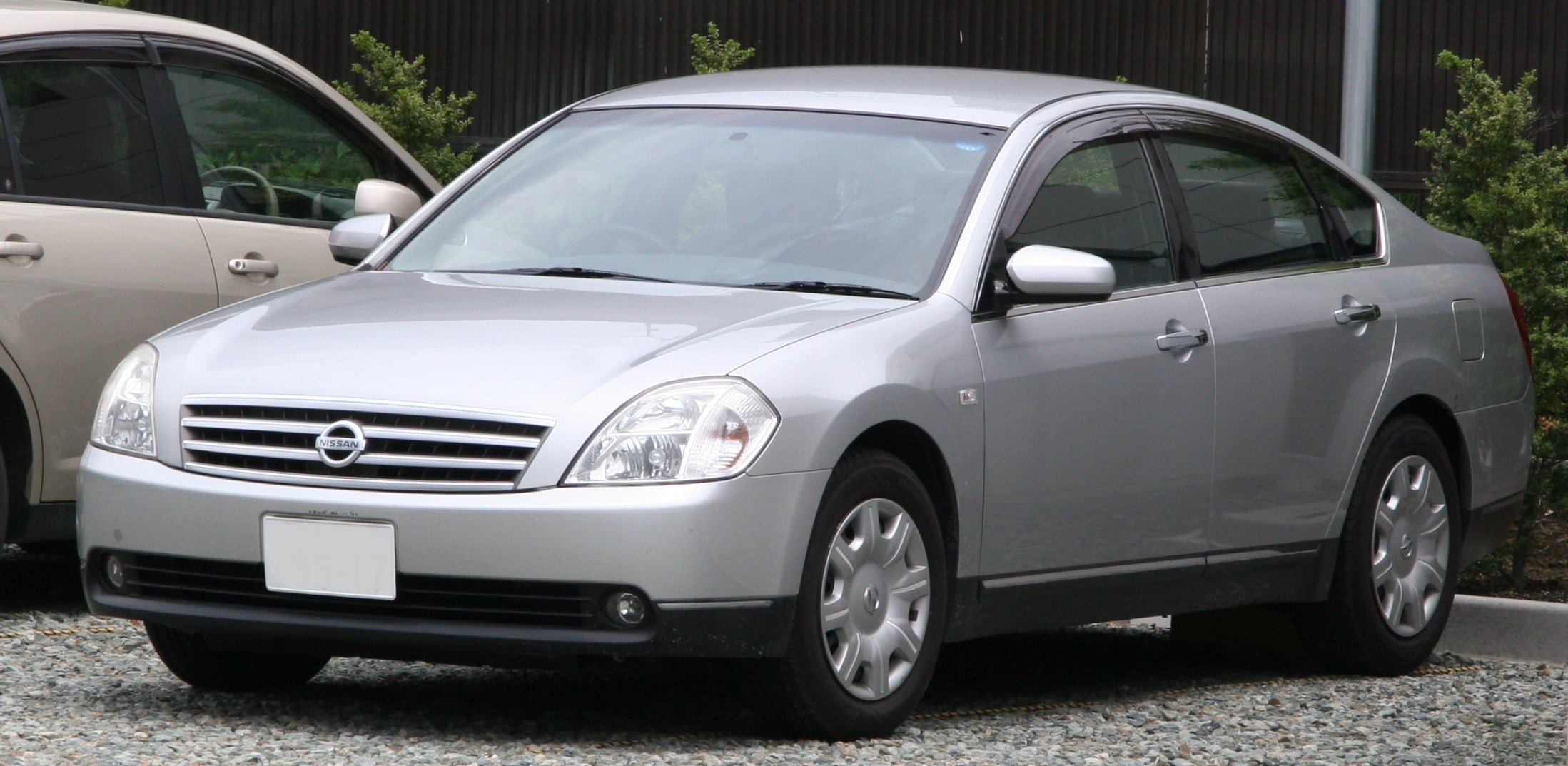

Overview
- Model code: J31
- Also called: Nissan Maxima; Nissan Cefiro; Renault Samsung SM7/SM5; Renault Safrane
- Production: 2003–2008; 2004–2009 (Thailand)
- Assembly: Japan: Kanda, Fukuoka (Nissan Shatai); China: Xiangfan; South Korea: Busan (RSM); Taiwan: Miaoli (Yulon Motors); Thailand: Samut Prakan

Body and chassis
- Platform: Nissan FF-L platform

Powertrain
- Engine: Petrol: 2.0 L QR20DE I4; 2.3 L VQ23DE V6 (J31); 2.5 L QR25DE I4 (TNJ31); 3.5 L VQ35DE V6 (PJ31)
- Transmission: 4-speed Jatco automatic 6-speed Jatco CVT with manual shift mode (2008)

Dimensions
- Wheelbase: 2,775 mm (109.3 in)
- Length: 4,770–4,845 mm (187.8–190.7 in)
- Width: 1,765 mm (69.5 in)
- Height: 1,475–1,495 mm (58.1–58.9 in)
- Curb weight: 1,460–1,540 kg (3,219–3,395 lb)

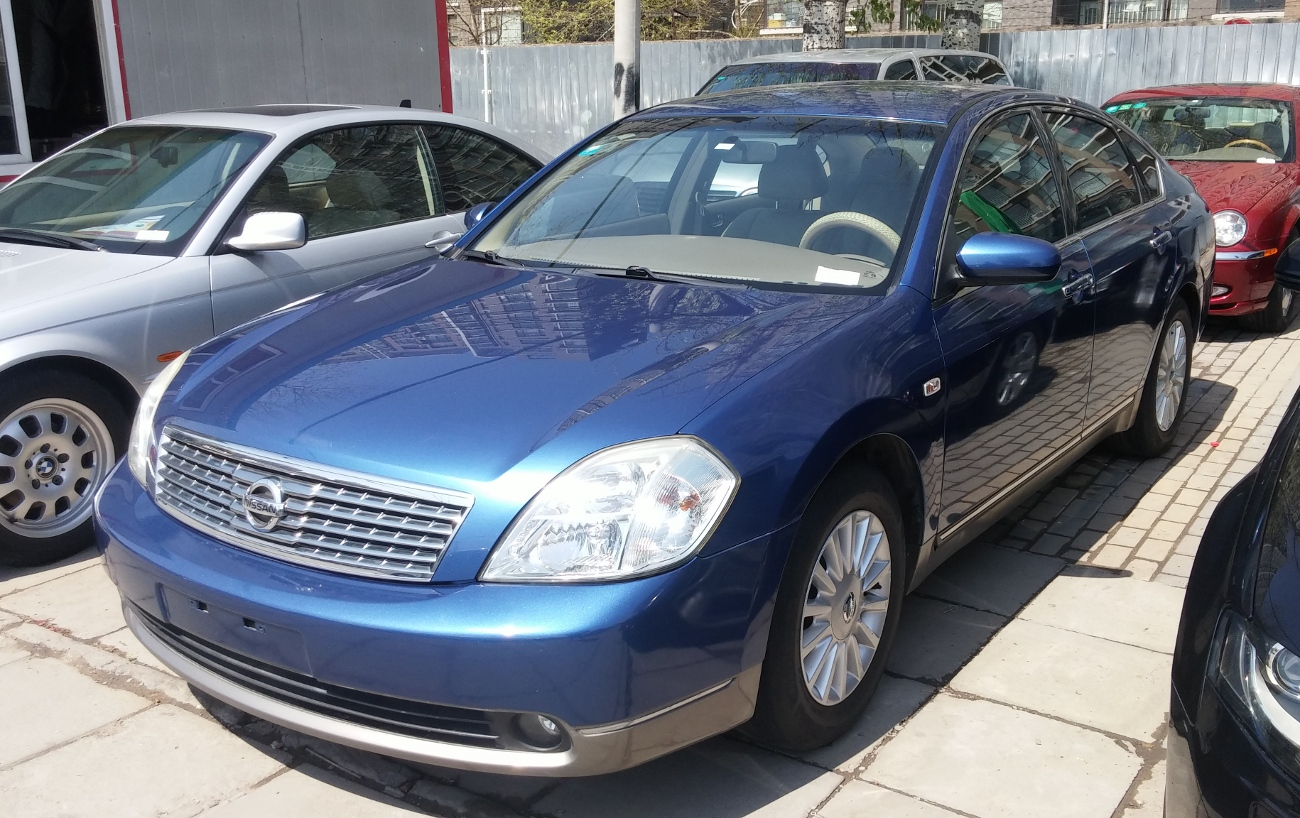
Nissan Teana 230JM (China)

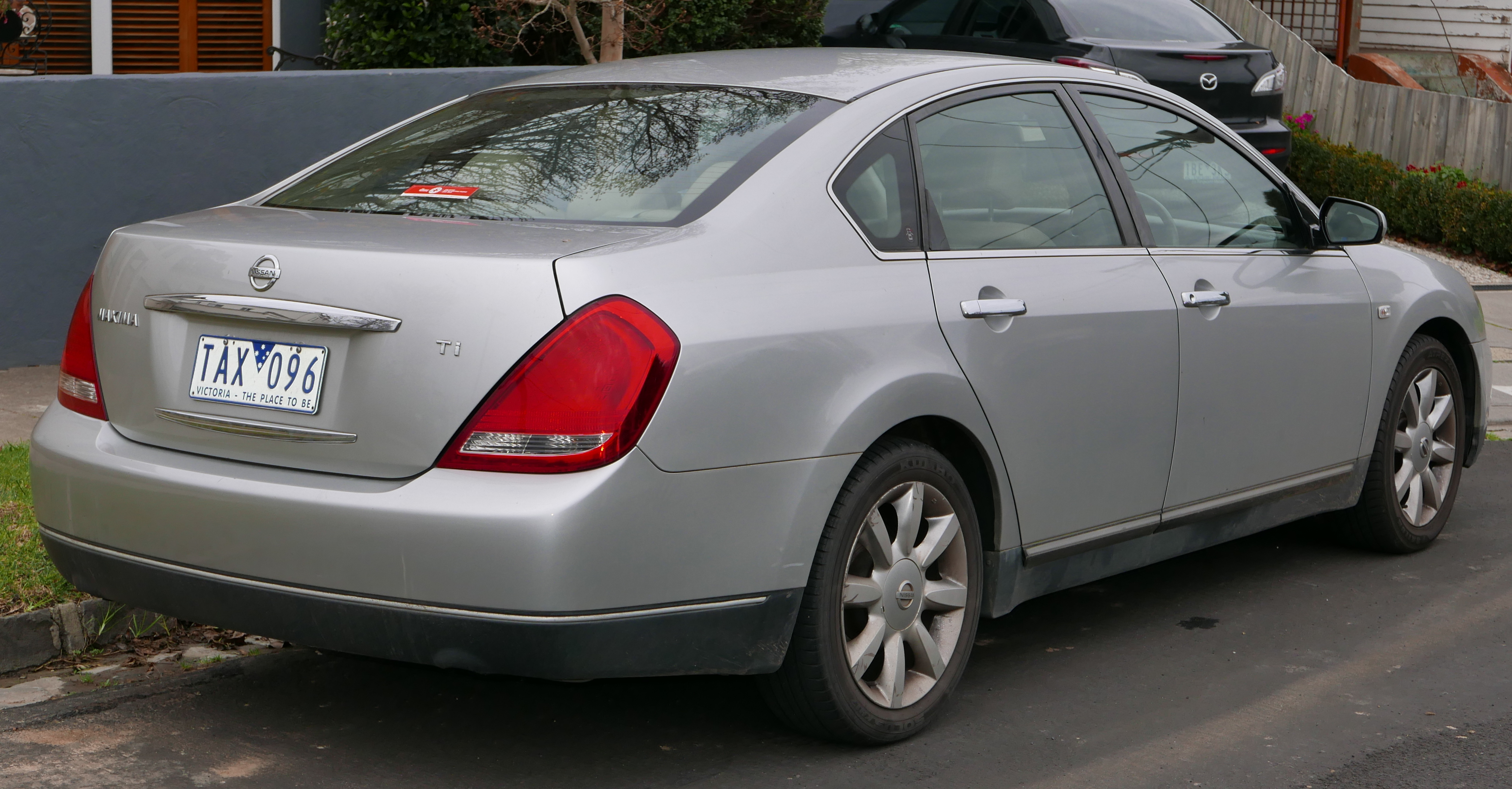
Pre-facelift Nissan Maxima Ti (Australia)

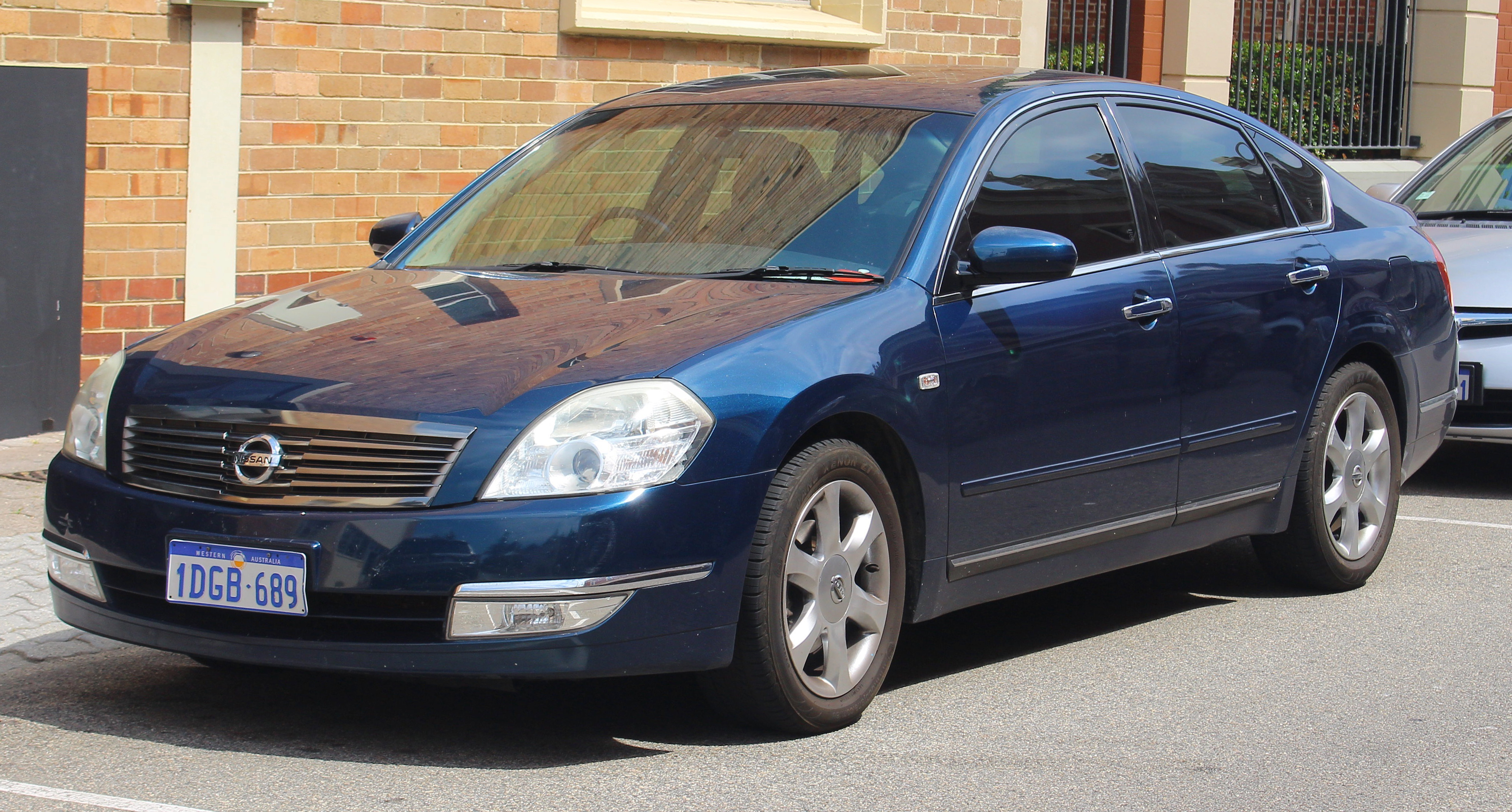

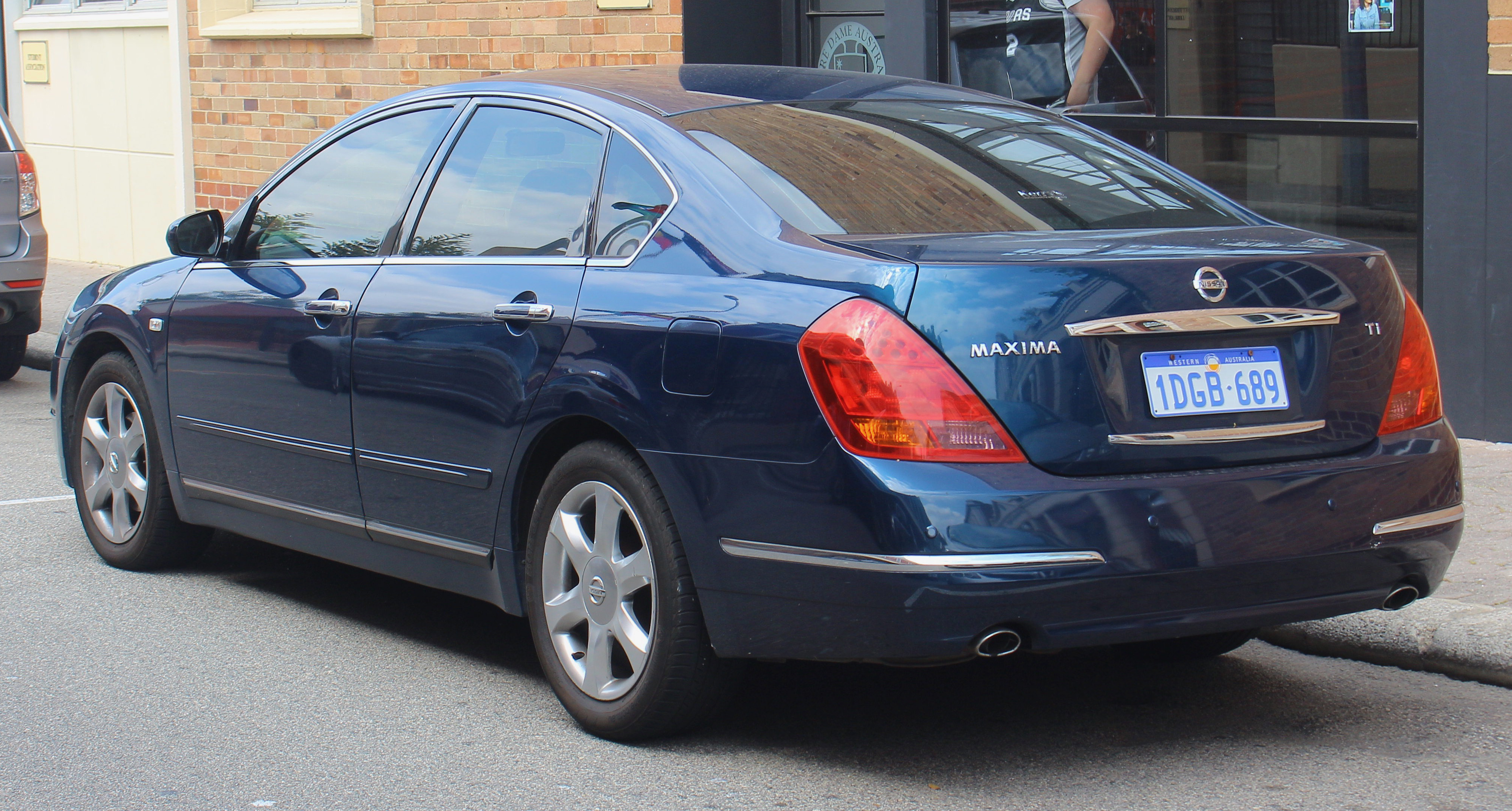
Facelift Nissan Maxima Ti (Australia)

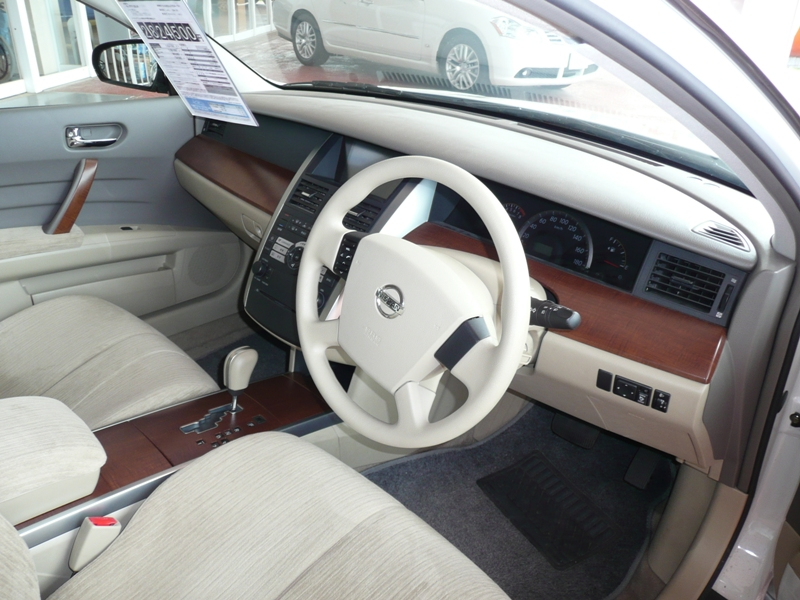
Interior

The J31 series Teana was first introduced in February 2003 to the Japanese market as a sedan companion to the Murano with both vehicles exclusive to Japanese Nissan dealerships called Nissan Red Stage. It replaced the Bluebird and Cefiro in Japan, along with the Laurel. It was considered one level below the Skyline. The Teana was designed around a cosseting, homelike interior with colours and materials inspired by interior design rather than the technological style used in most cars at the time. It was introduced with an optionally available internet-based, telematics and GPS navigation system called CarWings to Japanese drivers only.

The J31 Teana follows the same chassis number pattern as the Maxima (J30). In most of the world, the Teana was Nissan's largest front-wheel drive sedan, while the Skyline and Fuga are built on rear-wheel drive platforms.

Despite being largely unrelated to the long running Cefiro line, Nissan marketed the Teana using the Cefiro nameplate in Hong Kong, Singapore, Mauritius, Brunei, Sri Lanka, Nepal, Latin America, and the Caribbean while it was sold under the name of Teana in Japan, Thailand, Philippines, India, Taiwan, Malaysia, Indonesia and Mainland China. The car was marketed as the Maxima in Australia and New Zealand.

It was introduced a month later to other Asian markets like Singapore. In 2004 the car arrived on European shores, replacing the Maxima QX.

Powering the Teana was either a 1998 cc, 2349 cc or 3498 cc engine matched to automatic transmissions. Power outputs vary somewhat between the different markets. Trim levels were 200JK, 230JK, 230JM and 350JM. The car was based on the Nissan FF-L platform. In December 2005, the Teana received new headlights and taillights, chrome trimming on the bumpers, enlarged foglights, front legrests and newly designed gauges. The car was also shortened slightly, and the clear rear turn signals were replaced by amber ones. XTronic CVT was also mated to all the engines.

In mainland China, the Teana was manufactured by the Dongfeng Motor Company, a joint venture with Nissan. In Taiwan, it was manufactured by Yulon Motor. In the neighbouring country of Pakistan, the Teana was known as the Cefiro and was assembled in Karachi. Additionally, it was sold in India, Russia, Ukraine as well as in New Zealand and Australia where it competes with the locally produced Mitsubishi 380 and Toyota Aurion under the Maxima badge. The first generation Teana was also assembled in Thailand for sale in the Southeast Asian market.

A restyled version was sold in South Korea as the Renault Samsung SM7. In January 2005, Renault Samsung announced a lower-specification version of the Teana which it sold as the second generation (A34R) Renault Samsung SM5 and, from 2008, as the Renault Safrane.

In some countries, the 200JK was not sold. This was replaced by the 230JK, basically a 230JM with less equipment. In Australia, the Maxima was sold in ST-L, Ti and Ti-L trim levels. The Ti-L trim was dropped after the facelift in 2005.

In 2008, Nissan stopped production of the J31 but production continued in Thailand until 2009.

=== Engines and specifications ===
The first generation Teana utilized a number of engines, namely the QR20DE, VQ23DE and a slightly detuned version of the VQ35DE.

Trim level	0–100 km/h (0-62 mph)	Curb weight	Engine code	Capacity	Compr. ratio	Max. Power kW (PS/bhp) at rpm	Torque at rpm
200JK	12.1 seconds	1,450 kg (3,197 lb)	QR20DE	1997 cc	10.0:1	100 kW (136 PS; 134 hp) at 5,200 rpm	189 N⋅m (139 lb⋅ft) at 4,400 rpm
230JK/JM	9.3 seconds	1,540 kg (3,395 lb)	VQ23DE V6	2349 cc	9.8:1	127 kW (173 PS; 170 hp) at 6,000 rpm	221 N⋅m (163 lb⋅ft) at 4,400 rpm
350JM (Ti)	7.6 seconds	1,585 kg (3,494 lb)	VQ35DE V6	3498 cc	10.3:1	180 kW (245 PS; 241 hp) at 6,000 rpm	318 N⋅m (235 lb⋅ft) at 3,600 rpm

== Second generation (J32; 2008) ==
Second generation
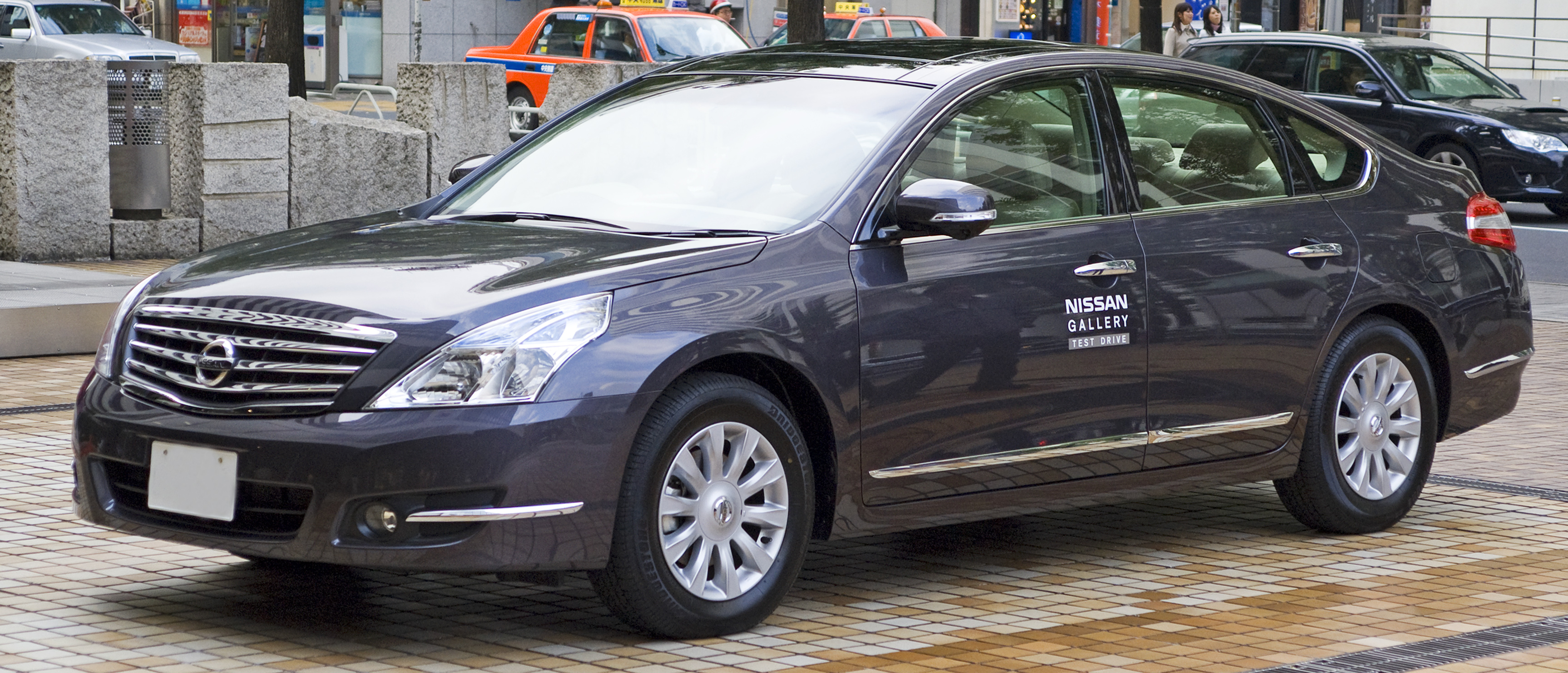

Overview
- Model code: J32
- Also called: Nissan Maxima (Australia and New Zealand)
- Production: 2008–2013; 2008–2019 (Taiwan); 2010–2013 (Iran); 2010–2014 (Malaysia)
- Assembly: Japan: Kanda, Fukuoka (Nissan Shatai); China: Xiangfan; India: Chennai; Iran: Tehran (Pars Khodro); Malaysia: Serendah (TCMA); Russia: Saint Petersburg; Taiwan: Miaoli (Yulon Motors); Thailand: Samut Prakan

Body and chassis
- Platform: Nissan D platform

Powertrain
- Engine: Petrol: 2.0 L MR20DE I4; 2.5 L QR25DE I4; 2.5 L VQ25DE V6; 3.5 L VQ35DE V6
- Transmission: Jatco JF010E CVT (Ratios: 2.371–0.439)

Dimensions
- Wheelbase: 2,775 mm (109.3 in)
- Length: 4,850 mm (190.9 in)
- Width: 1,795 mm (70.7 in)
- Height: 1,475–1,500 mm (58.1–59.1 in)
- Curb weight: 1,480–1,570 kg (3,263–3,461 lb)

Nissan revealed the second generation, redesigned Teana at the 2008 Beijing Auto Show. The new Teana was based on the Nissan D platform also used by the new North American Nissan Maxima and Nissan Altima. Engine choices include a 3498 cc V6 (which required high octane gasoline), a 2495 cc V6, a 2488 cc inline-four, and a 1997 cc inline-four, all with a continuously variable transmission. The car's design was previewed by the Intima concept car shown in October 2007. In Japan, the sole I4 engine offered was the QR25DE 2488cc four-cylinder engine and was only available with four-wheel-drive; four-wheel-drive was not available for V6 engines due to packaging constraints. In Japan, the 3.5-liter engine was discontinued in January 2013, leaving only the smaller 2.5 options.

The car was launched in Japan, Taiwan, India, Iran, Mauritius, Russia, China, Brunei, Bolivia, Chile, Colombia, Trinidad and Tobago, Thailand, Singapore, Philippines, Indonesia, Malaysia, New Zealand, and Australia. This generation was not sold in Western Europe, where its French cousin, the Renault Laguna was offered, alongside the longer Franco-Korean Renault Latitude.

Nissan continued to offer an optionally available internet-based, telematics and GPS navigation system called CarWings but to Japanese drivers only.

From this generation forward, the car stereo system had an optionally available feature called Music Box which allowed users to record CDs and listen to them. This system was also available on the Maxima and Altima.

The Teana shares most of the platform and mechanicals with its North American cousin, the Altima which is built and sold primarily in North America. The J32 has been sold in Australia as a Maxima since June 2009 with model designations of 250 ST-L, 350 ST-S and 350 Ti. These models have features unique to Australia and New Zealand including alloy wheel design, rear spoiler and interior upholstery fittings. In late 2011, all three Australian models received an equipment upgrade, with prices remaining unchanged. The Cefiro nameplate has been discontinued on the second-generation line. In Japan, China, Southeast Asia, and the Caribbean, the vehicle was known as the Teana.

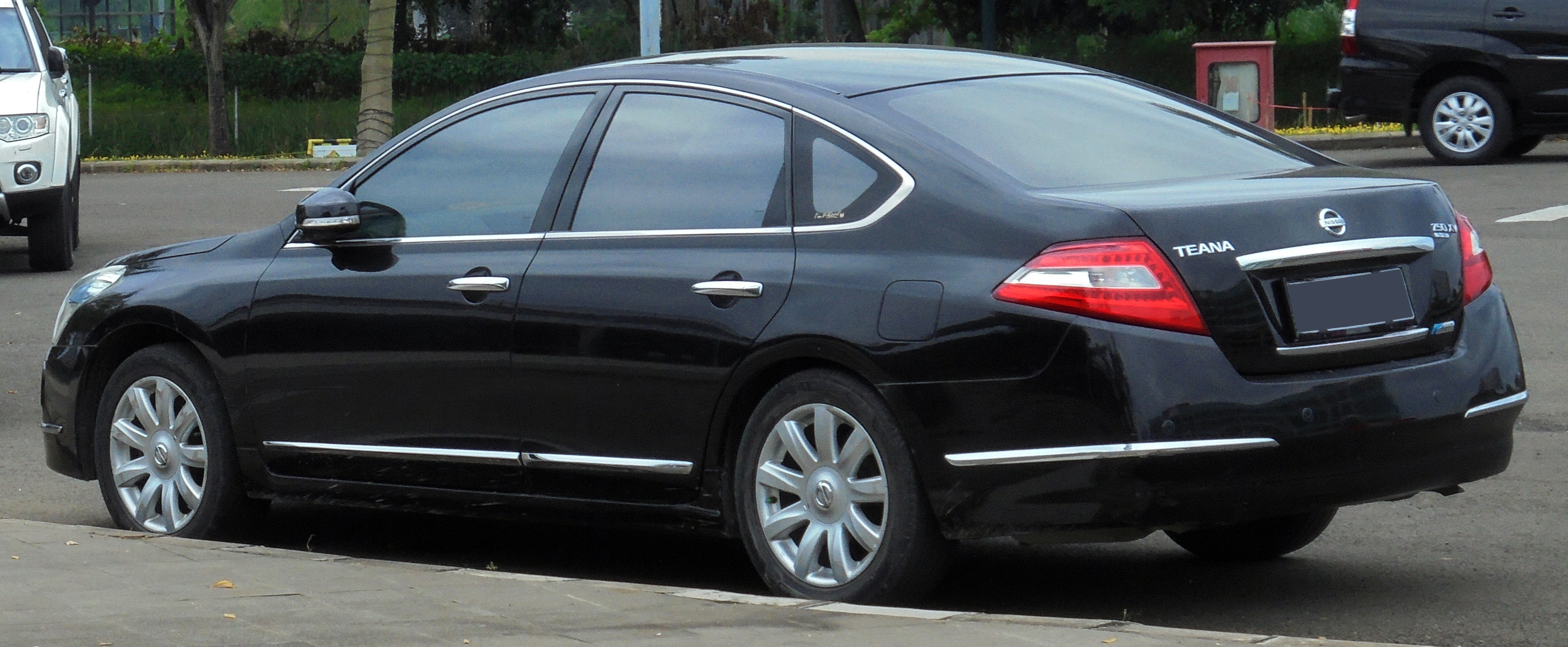
2010 Nissan Teana 250 XV (J32; pre-facelift, Indonesia)

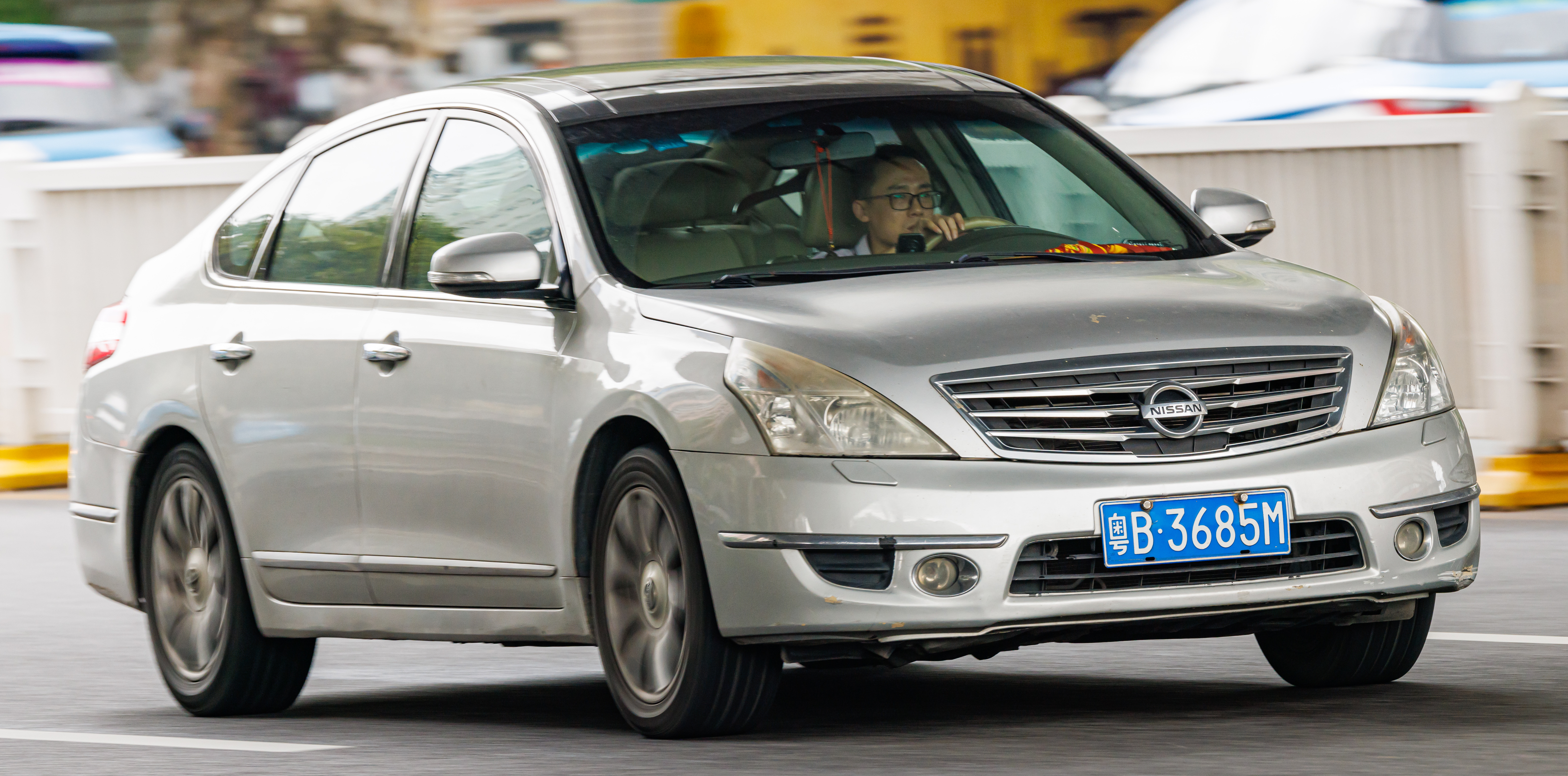
Nissan Teana VIP (J32; pre-facelift, China)

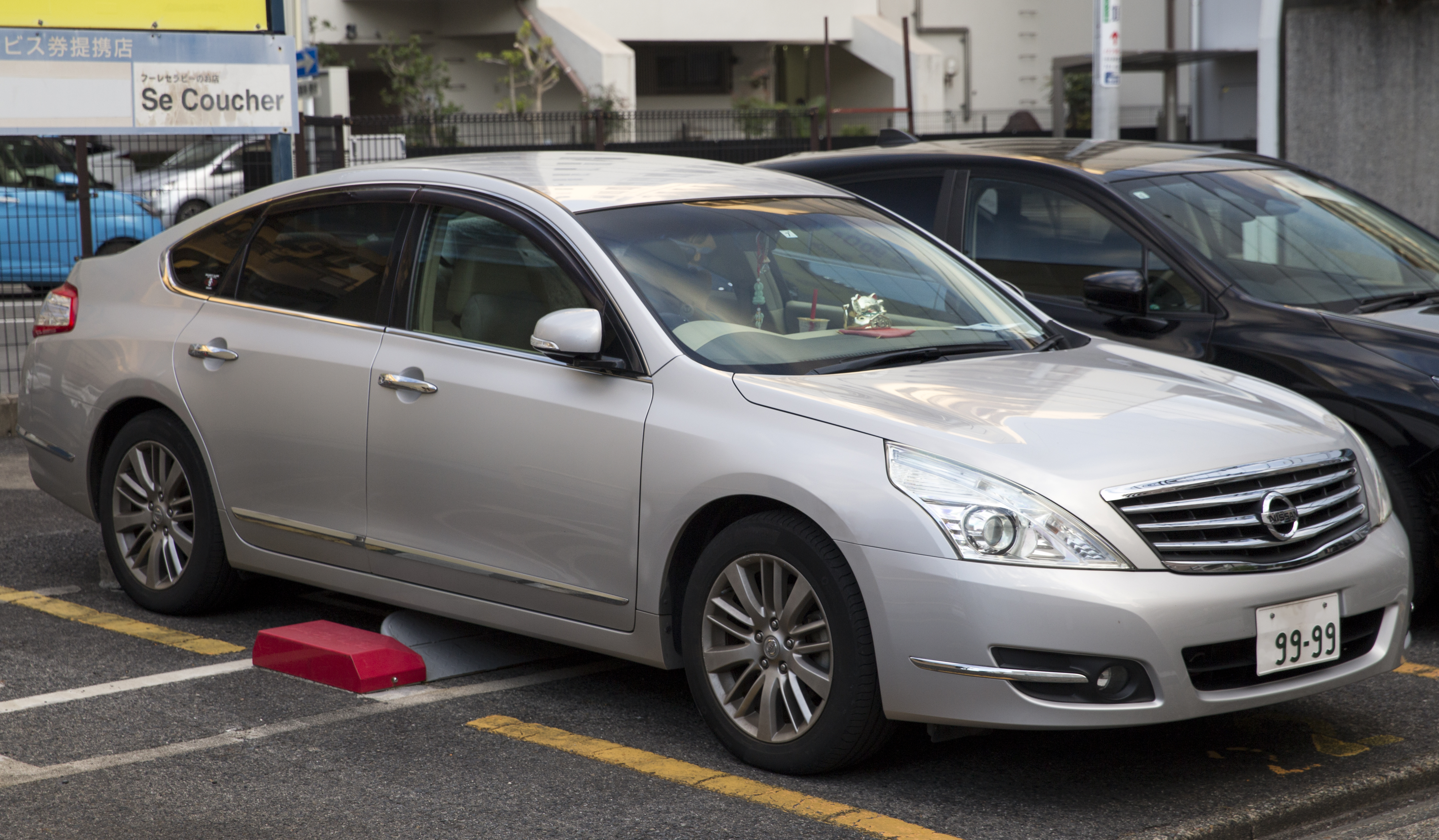
Nissan Teana 250 XV (J32; facelift, Japan)

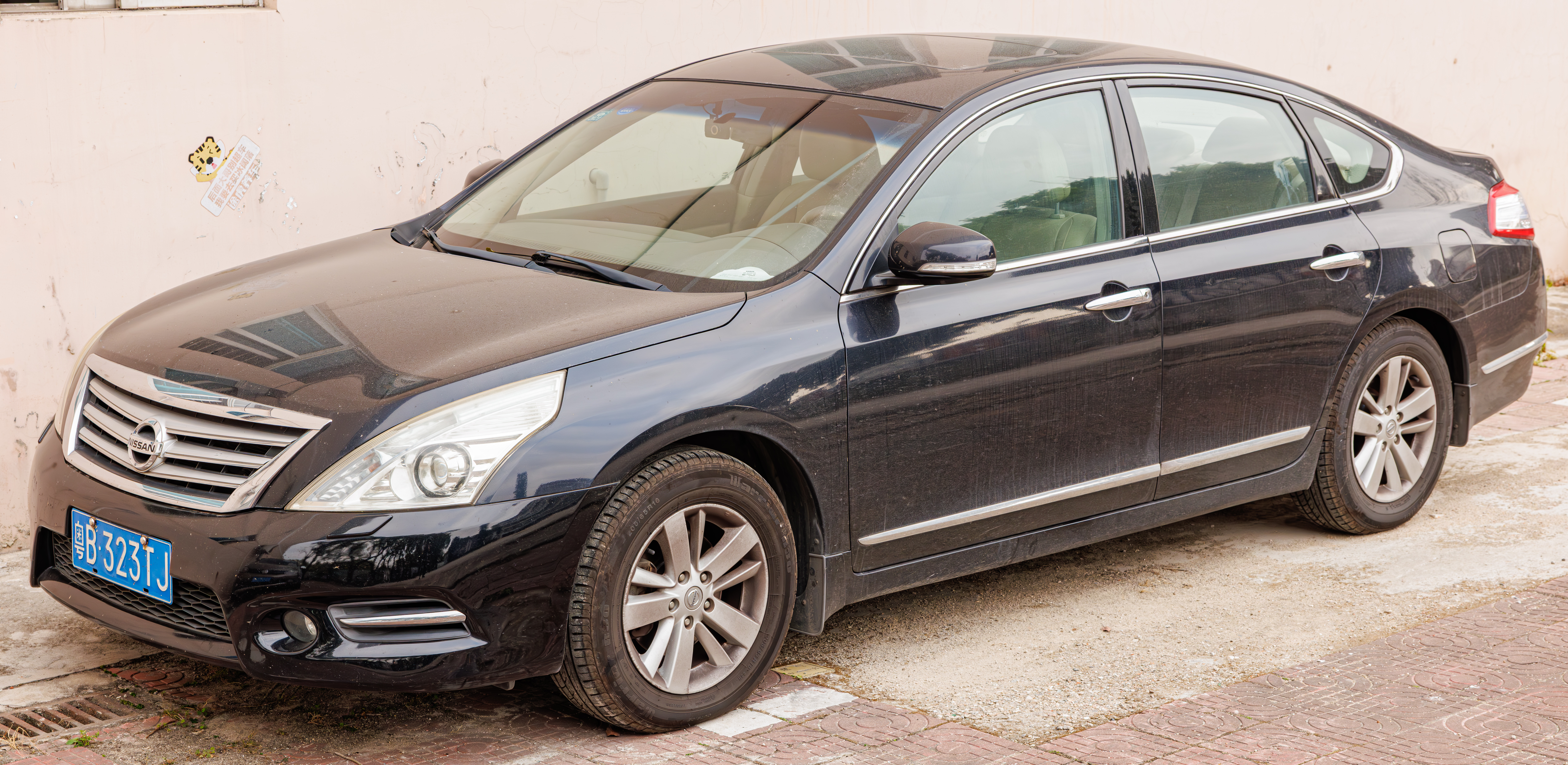
Nissan Teana (J32; facelift, China)

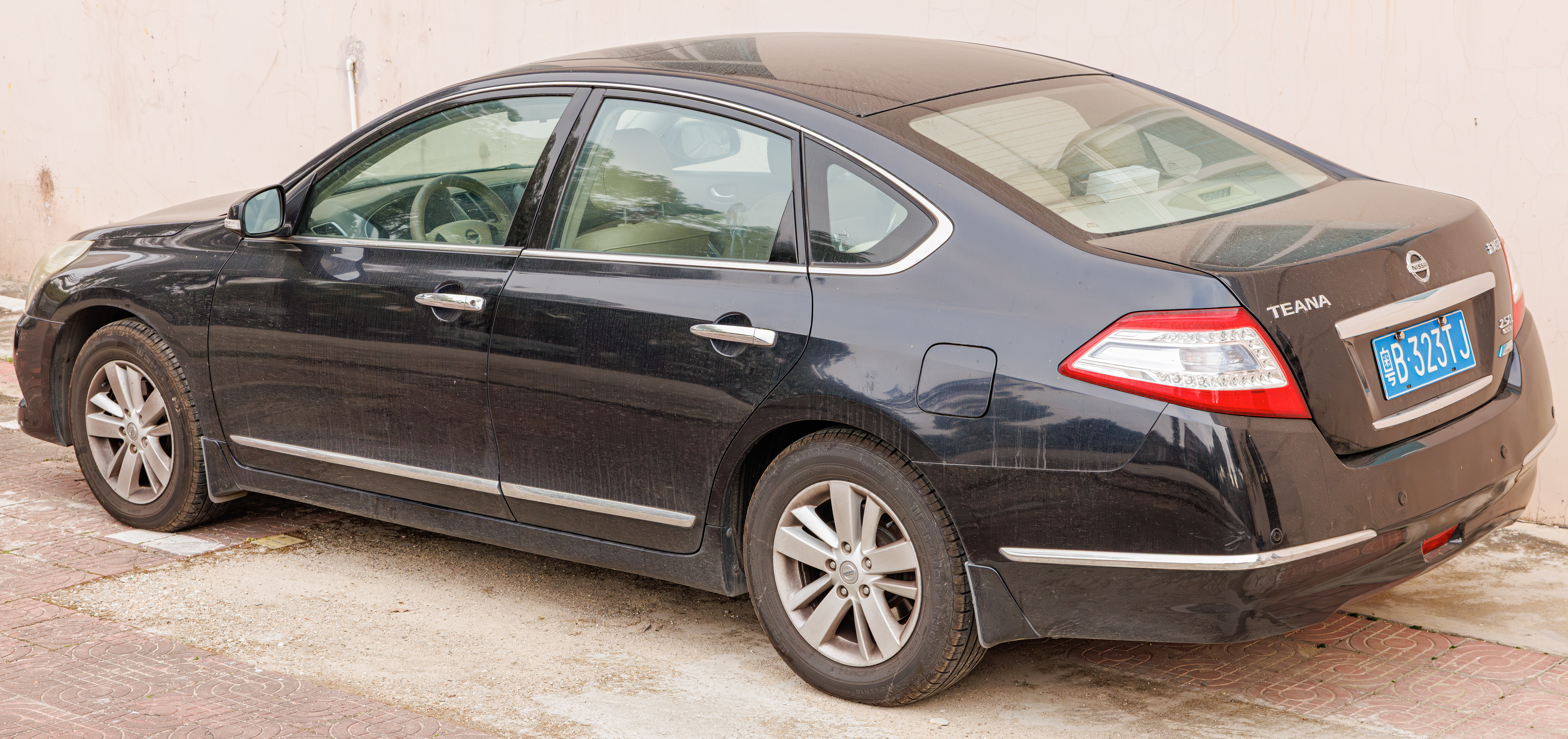
Nissan Teana (J32; facelift, China)

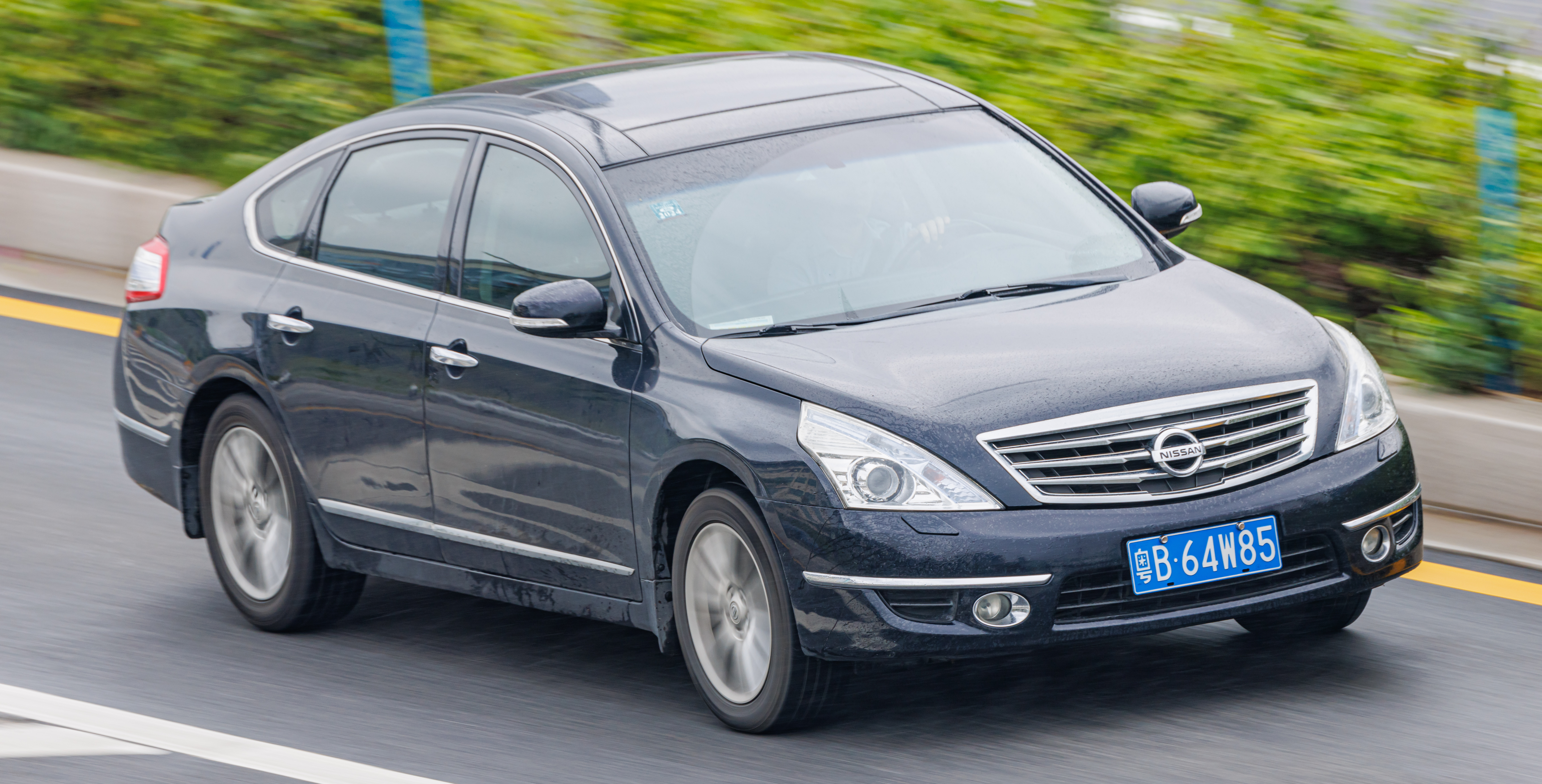
Nissan Teana VIP (J32; facelift, China)

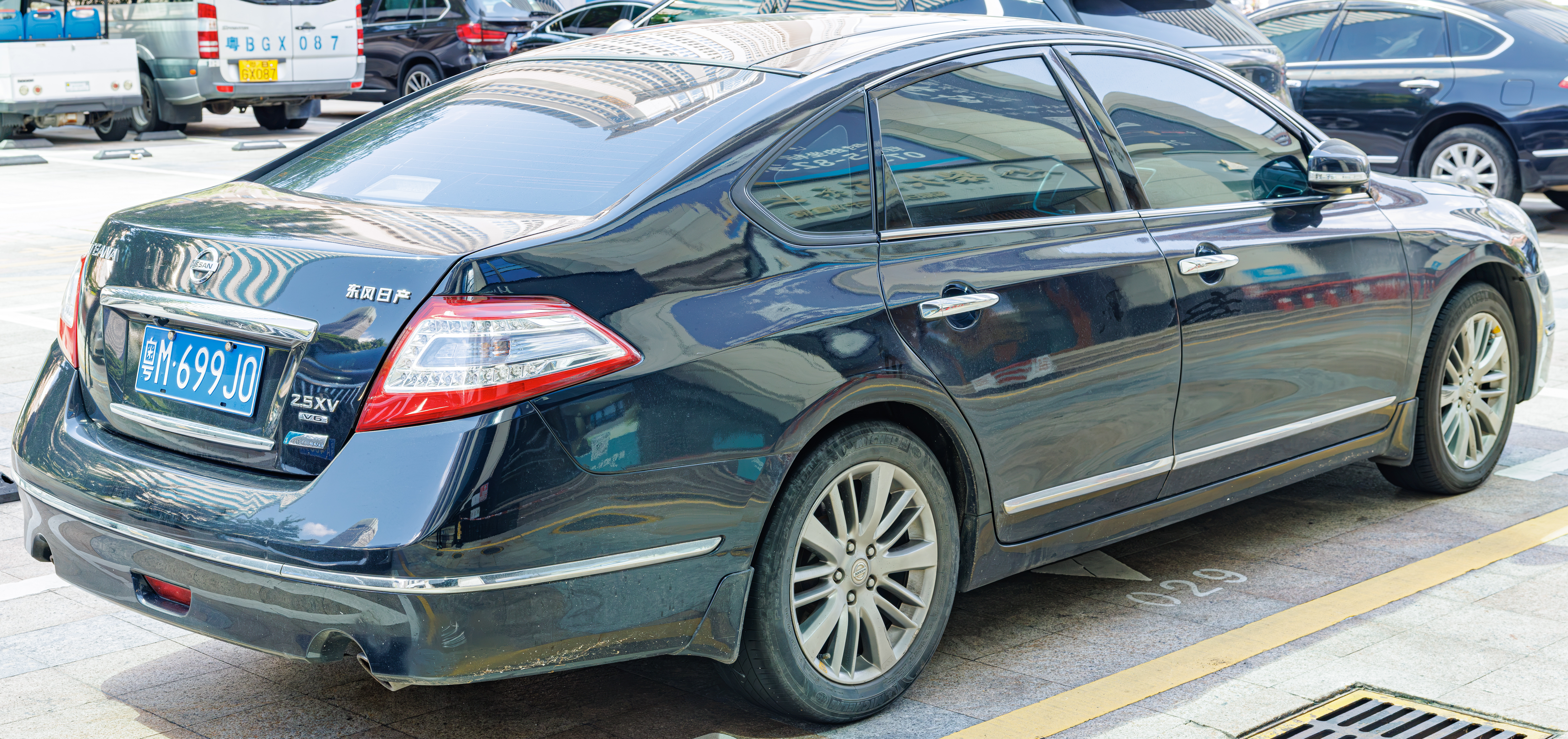
Nissan Teana VIP (J32; facelift, China)

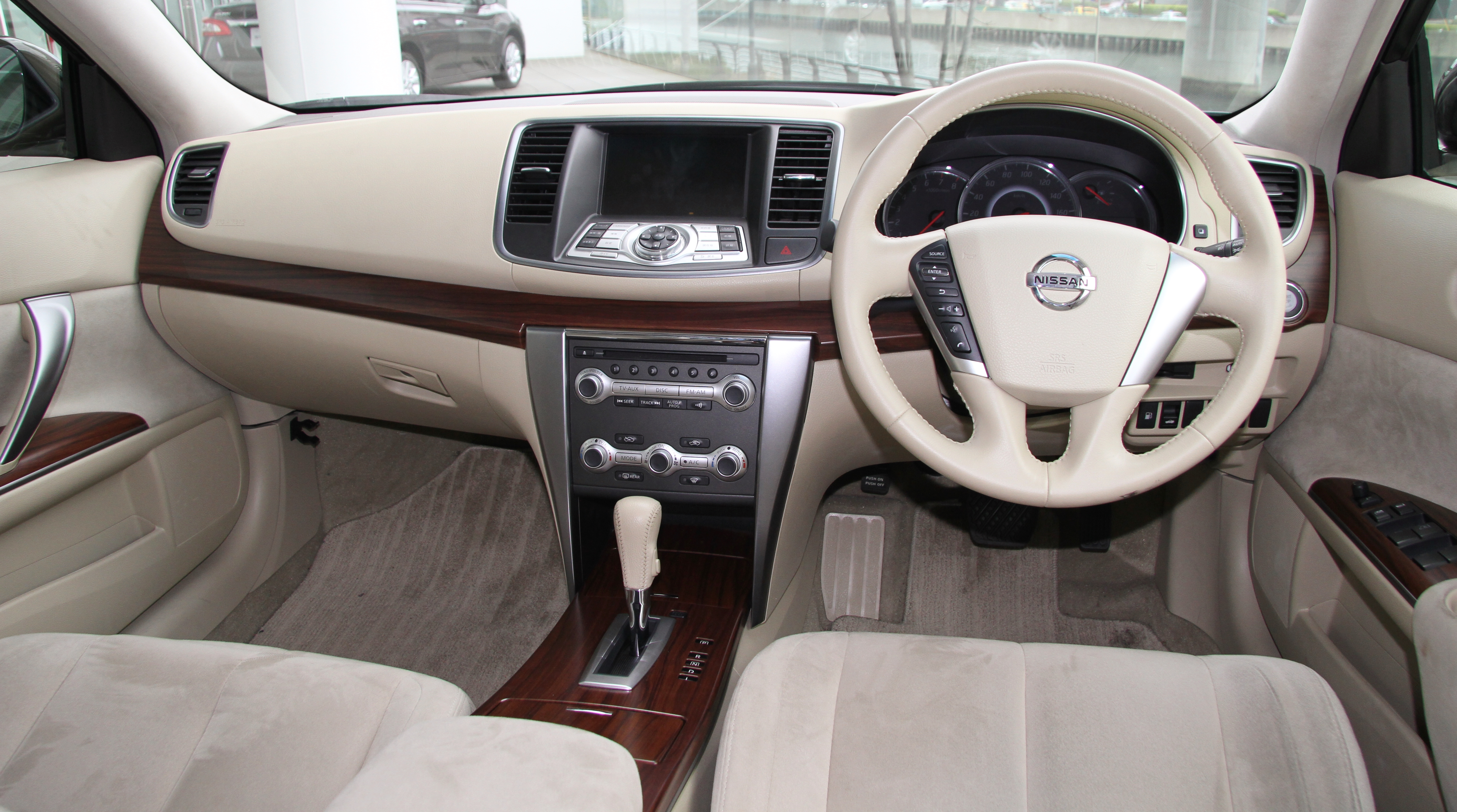
Interior

=== Specifications ===
The second generation Teana utilized different engines, namely the MR20DE (successor of the QR series) four-cylinder for the Chinese market, and the VQ25DE and VQ35DE V6 engines for Japan and most export markets. The latter six was tweaked to produce 20 more PS than the first generation Teana. The Japanese-exclusive four-wheel drive model "FOUR" used a QR25DE four-cylinder engine.

Trim level	Max. Power kW (PS, hp) at rpm	Max. Torque	0–100 km/h (0-62 mph)	Engine code	Capacity
200XL *China market	100 kW (136 PS; 134 hp) at 5600 rpm	190 N⋅m (19.4 kg⋅m; 140 lb⋅ft) at 4400 rpm	11.8 seconds	MR20DE L4	1997 cc
250XV	136 kW (185 PS; 182 hp) at 6000 rpm	232 N⋅m (23.7 kg⋅m; 171 lb⋅ft) at 4400 rpm	9.0 seconds	VQ25DE V6	2495 cc
250XL/XE FOUR *Japan market	123 kW (167 PS; 165 hp) at 5600 rpm	240 N⋅m (24.5 kg⋅m; 177 lb⋅ft) at 4000 rpm		QR25DE L4	2488 cc
350XV	185 kW (252 PS; 248 hp) at 6000 rpm	335 N⋅m (34.2 kg⋅m; 247 lb⋅ft) at 4400 rpm	7.1 seconds	VQ35DE V6	3498 cc

== Third generation (L33; 2013) ==
The third generation Teana was introduced in 2013 to some markets as a rebadged version of the North American L33 Altima.

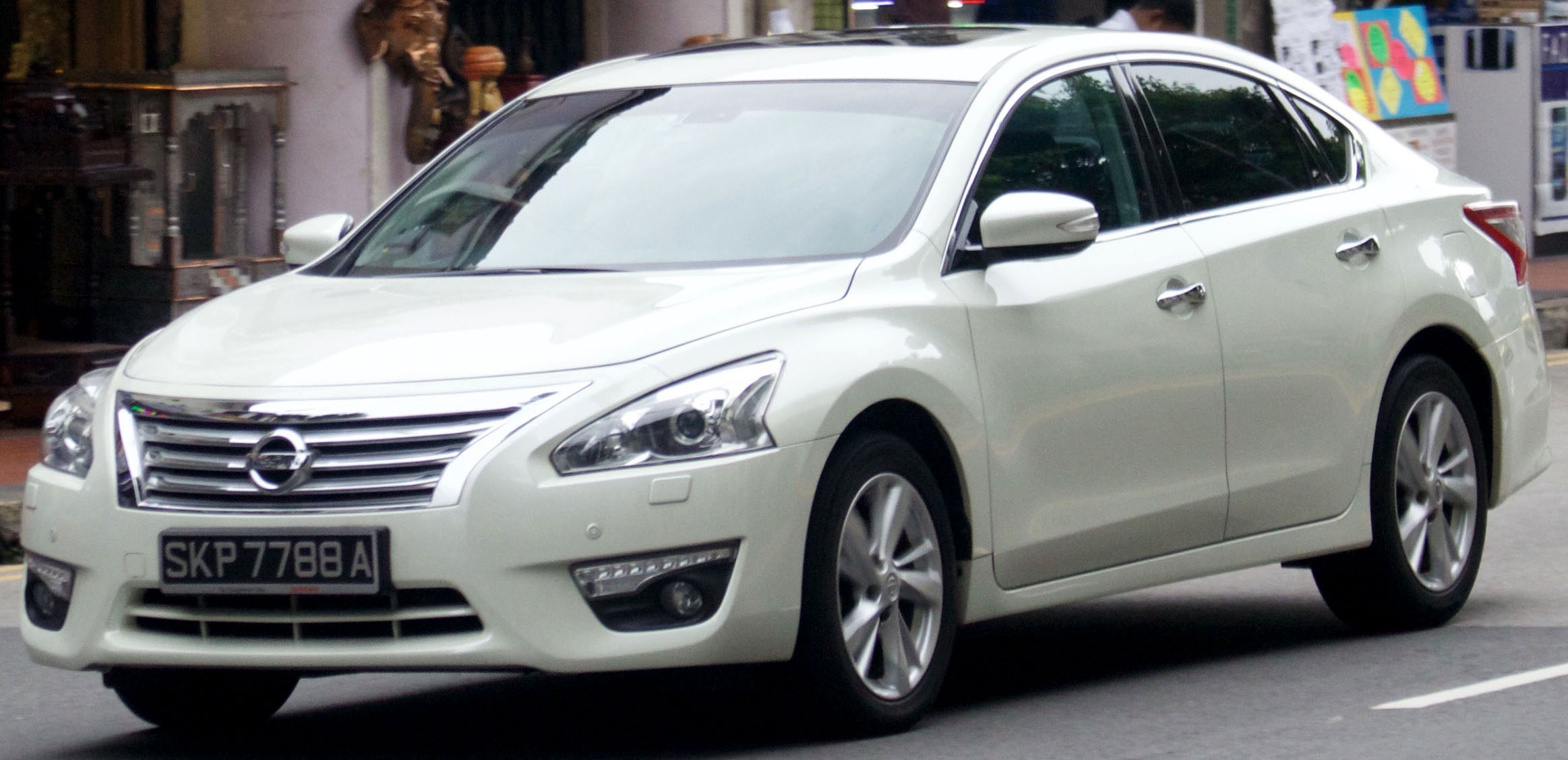
Third generation Teana (L33; pre-facelift)

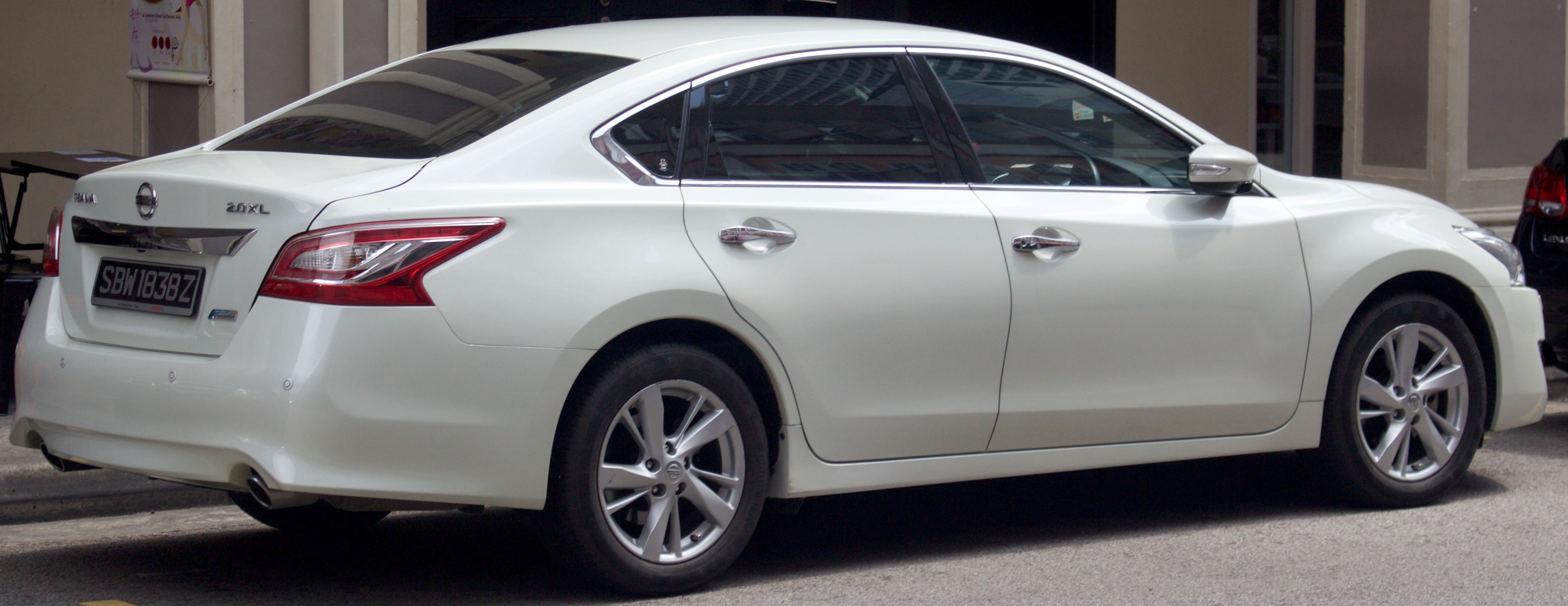
Third generation Teana (L33; pre-facelift)

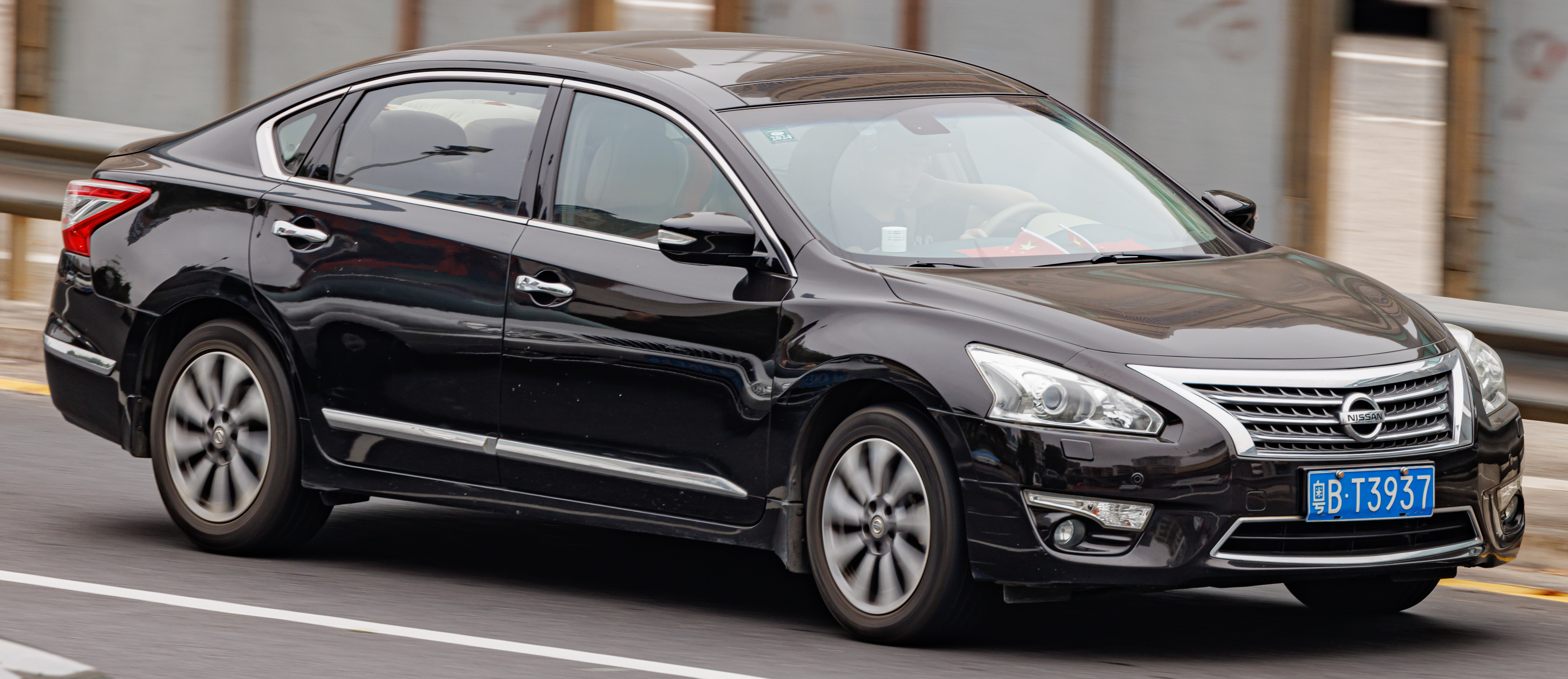
Third generation Teana VIP (L33; pre-facelift)

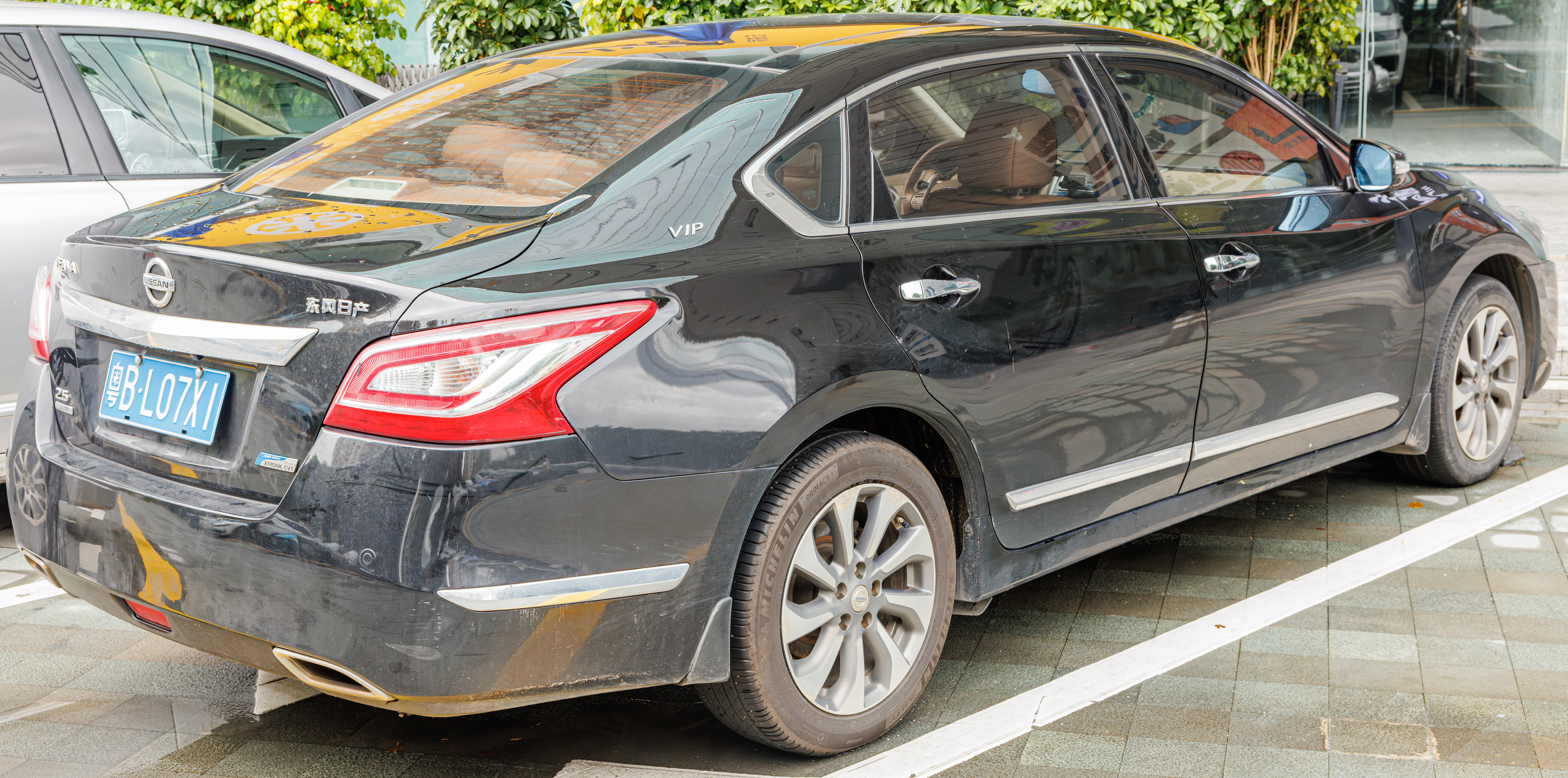
Third generation Teana VIP (L33; pre-facelift)

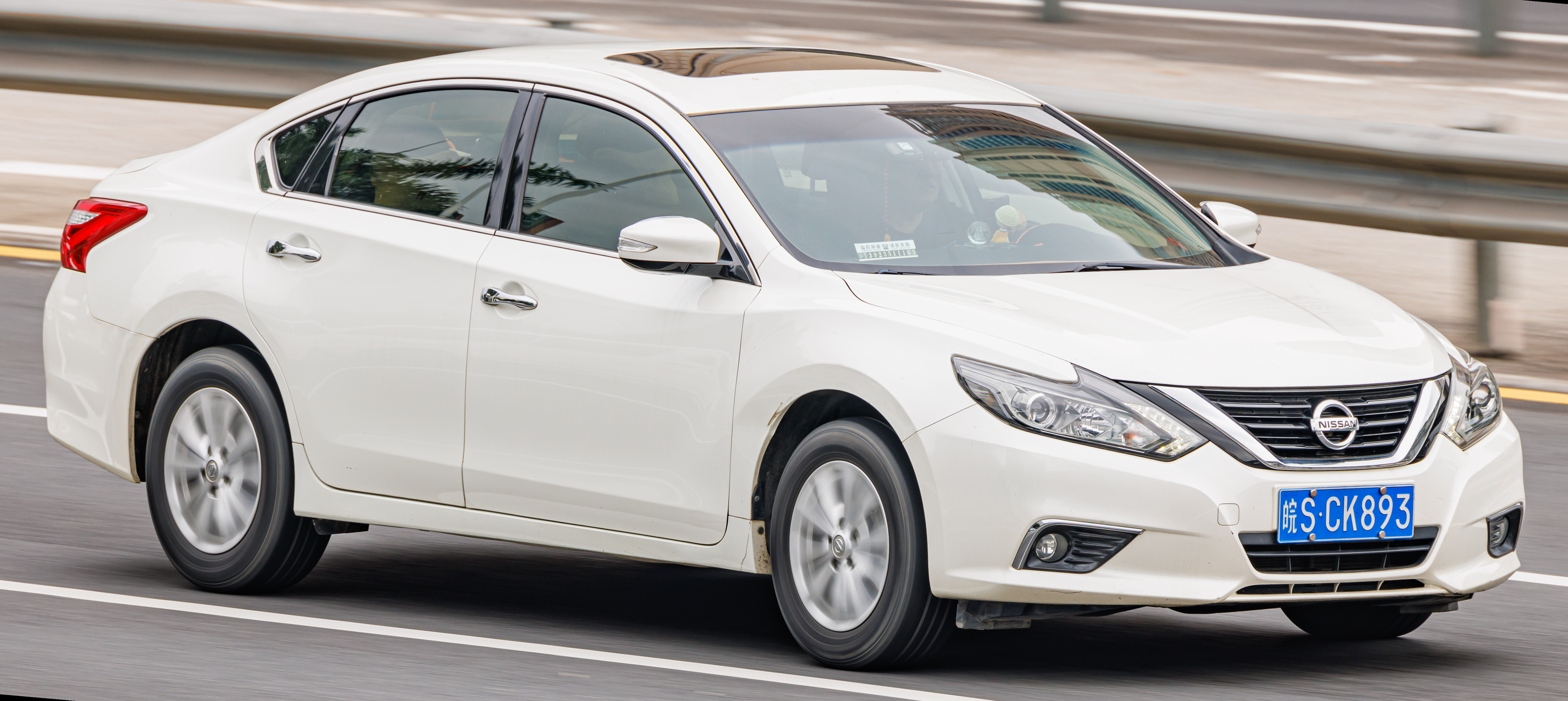
Third generation Teana (L33; facelift)

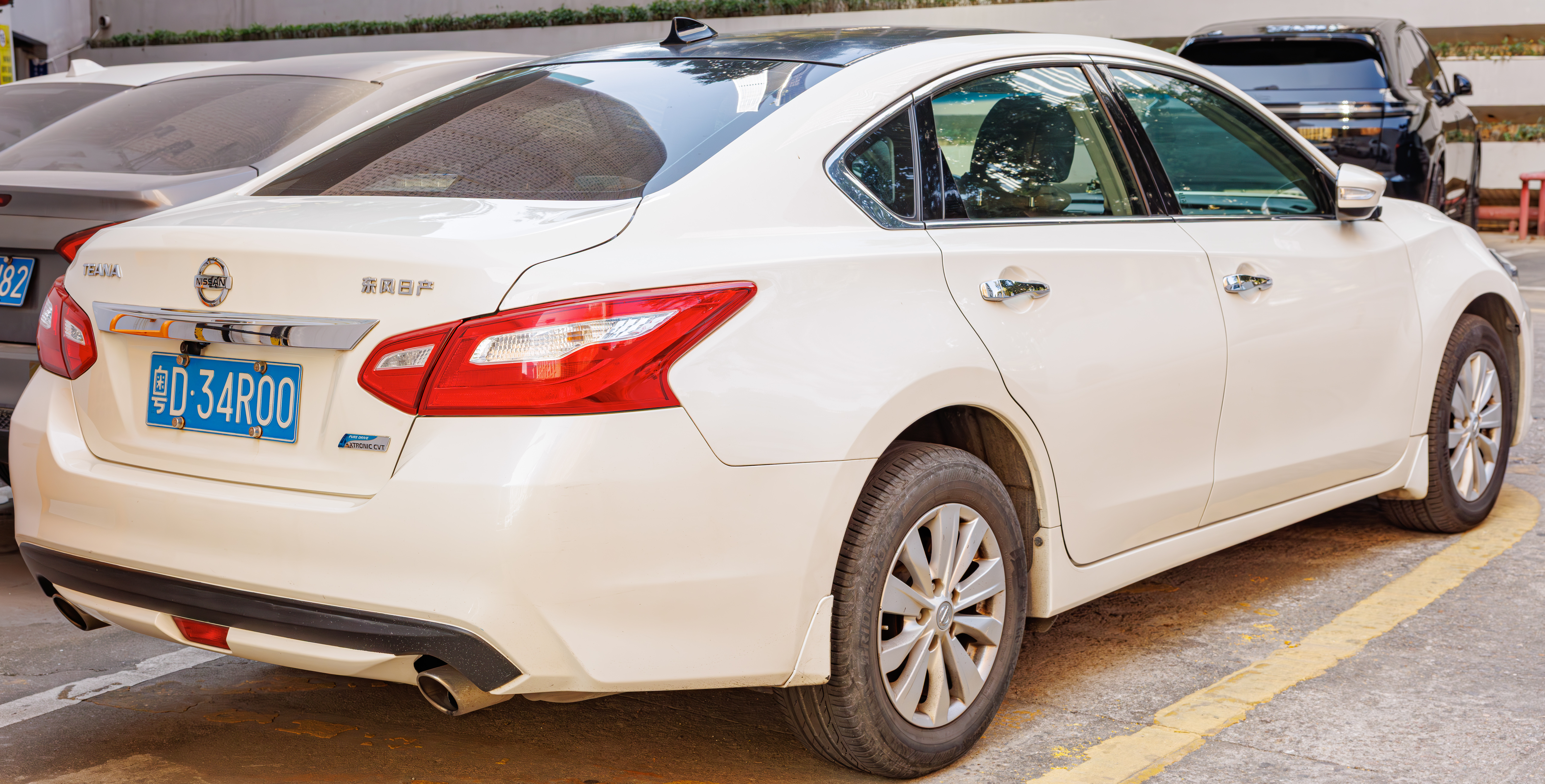
Third generation Teana (L33; facelift)

== Fourth generation (L34; 2025) ==
The fourth generation Teana was introduced in 2025 to the Chinese market with the Teana name as a more premium variant of the L34 Altima. The L34 generation in China was originally launched as the Altima in December 2018 while retaining the original Chinese name of the Teana, Tianlai (天籁), and received a facelift in 2022. The 2026 model year Teana was unveiled in August 2025 to be sold alongside the outgoing Altima and is equipped with Huawei's Harmony Space 5.

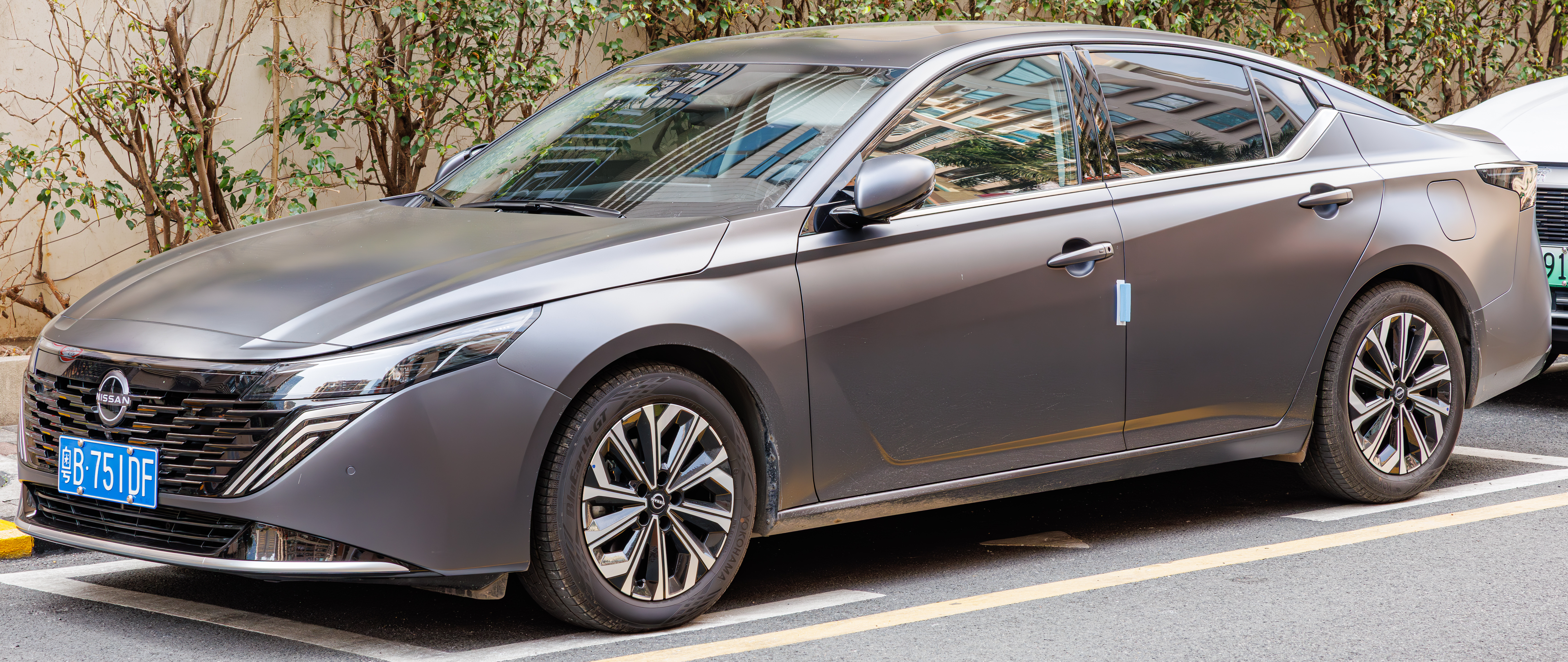
Fourth generation Teana (L34, China)

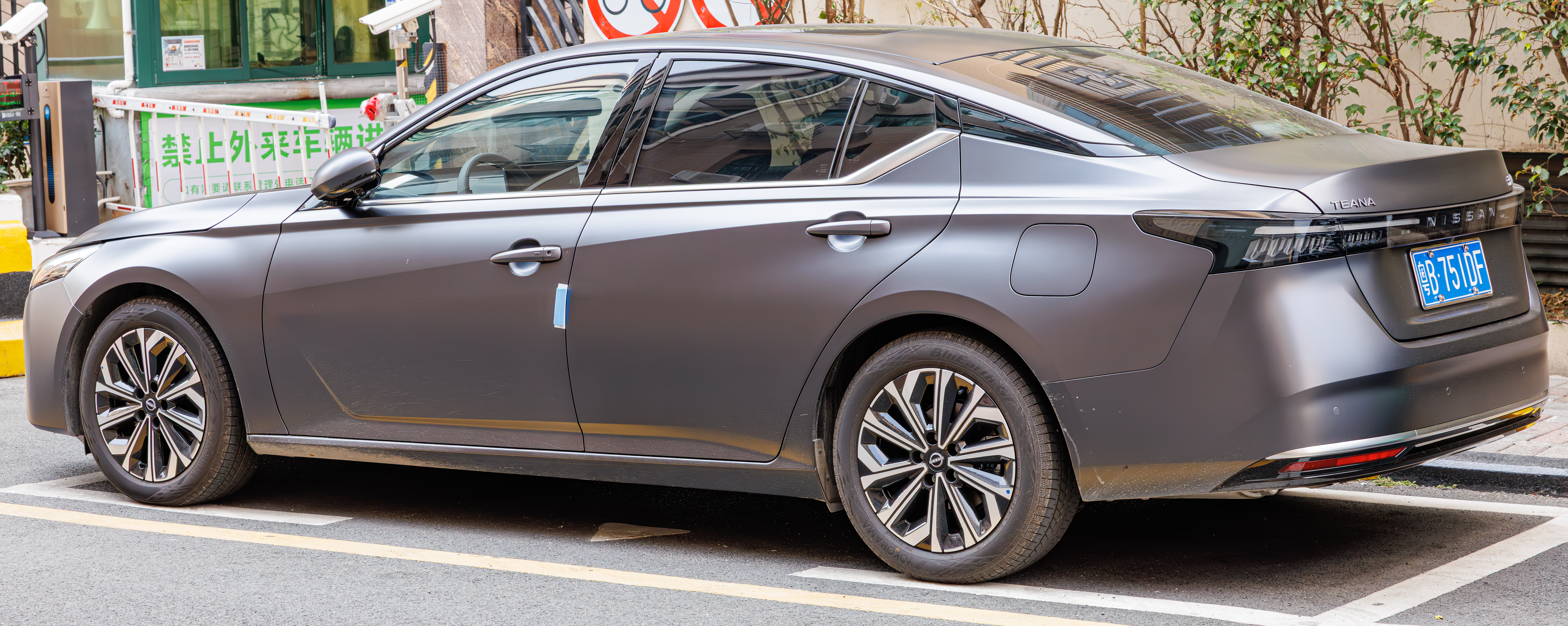
Fourth generation Teana (L34, China)

== Sales ==
Calendar Year	Thailand
2014	3,752
2015	1,732
2016	987
2017	448
2018	569
