= Kenneth Yen =

Taiwanese businessman

- 嚴凱泰
- Born: 23 May 1965; Taipei, Taiwan
- Died: 3 December 2018 (aged 53); Taipei Veterans General Hospital, Beitou, Taipei, Taiwan
- Education: Rider University (BA)
- Occupation: Entrepreneur
- Spouse: Chen Li-lien 陳莉蓮
- Parents: Yen Ching-ling 嚴慶齡 (father); Vivian Wu 吳舜文 (mother)

Kenneth Yen (Chinese: 嚴凱泰; pinyin: Yán Kǎitài; 23 May 1965 – 3 December 2018) was a Taiwanese entrepreneur who was listed as one of the richest people in the world.

== Biography ==
Yen was born in Taipei, Taiwan to 嚴慶齡 Yen Ching-ling and 吳舜文 Vivian Shun-wen Wu. He attended secondary school at Tsai-Hsing High School in Taipei's Muzha District and later went to boarding school at The Pennington School. He attended Rider University in the United States where he studied business administration. He also received an honorary business degree from St. John's University. In 1986, he returned to Taiwan to lead the China Motor Corporation and Yulon, his family's business. Yen was officially named chairman of Yulon in August 2007. According to Forbes magazine, he had an estimated net worth of US$1.05 billion.

== Personal life ==
Yen had one daughter, Michelle, and a son, John, with wife Chen Lee-lien. He died of esophageal cancer at Taipei Veterans General Hospital on 3 December 2018.
