= Yulon =

Taiwanese automaker

Yulon Motor Co., Ltd.

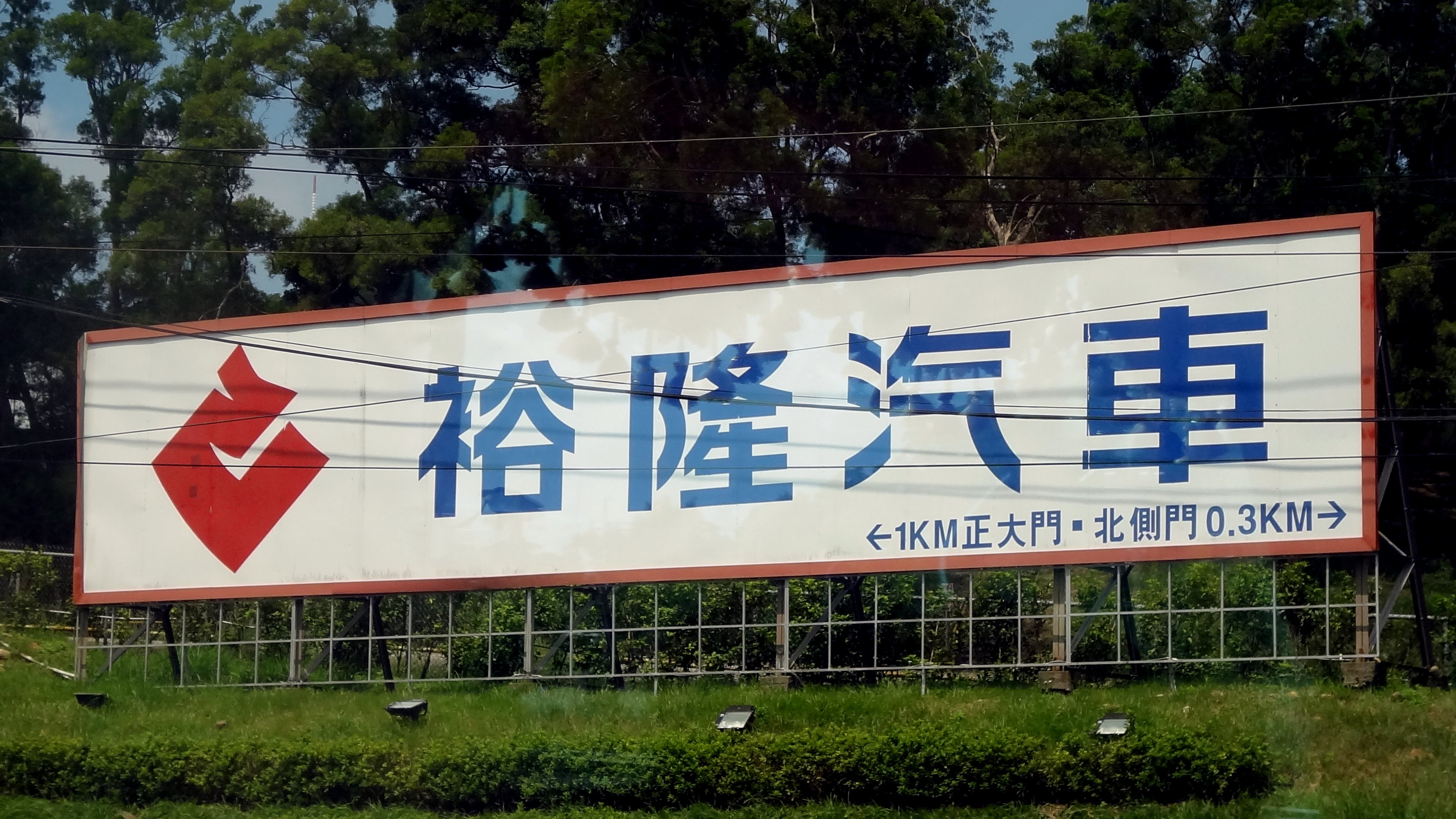
- Native name: 裕隆汽車
- Type: Public
- Traded as: TWSE: 2201
- Industry: Automotive Industry
- Founded: 10 September 1953; 73 years ago
- Headquarters: Miaoli County, Taiwan
- Area served: Taiwan, mainland China, and the Philippines
- Key people: Yen Chen Li-Yien (chairman); Chen-Hsiang Yao (Vice Chairman); Kuo-Hsing Hsu (president)
- Products: Automobiles
- Revenue: NT$99 billion (2017) US$3.4 billion
- Owner: Yen family
- Number of employees: 12.68k (2017)
- Divisions: China Motor Corporation
- Subsidiaries: Yulon-Nissan Motor Co Ltd (50%); Dongfeng Yulon (50%); Yulon GM (50%); Foxtron (50%)
- Website: www.yulon-motor.com.tw

Yulon
- Traditional Chinese: 裕隆汽車
- Simplified Chinese: 裕隆汽车
Transcriptions
Standard Mandarin
- Hanyu Pinyin: Yùlóng Qìchē
Southern Min
- Hokkien POJ: Ū-liông Khì-chhia

Yulon Motor Co., Ltd. (Chinese: 裕隆汽車; pinyin: Yùlóng Qìchē) is a Taiwanese automaker and importer. Taiwan's biggest automaker as of 2010, Yulon is known for building Nissan models under license. The original romanization of the company's name is Yue Loong, but in 1992 the company renewed its logo and switched to the shorter Yulon name. Historically, it is one of Taiwan's "big four" automakers. The company has over time evolved as a holding company that encompassed multiple public entities such as Yulon-Nissan Motor, Yulon Financial, Yulon Rental, Carnival Industrial Corporation and others. The group currently has a rivalry with Hotai Motor Group as the two largest Taiwanese automotive companies.

Yulon created a new brand to sell self-designed cars, Luxgen, in 2010.

As of 2017 it had a revenue of NT$99 billion (US$3.4 billion) and about 12,680 employees.

== History ==
Incorporated in September 1953 as a machinery company by Ching-Ling Yen, today Yulon Motor Co., Ltd. is part of the Yulon Group, a Taiwanese conglomerate.

The company is associated with the creation of a Taiwanese auto industry aided by its government. During 1953–1960 an era of "passive protection" reigned and Yulon grew with the assistance of protectionary tariffs of 40–60%. Parts and components received substantially lower tariffs to help fledgling carmakers.

Early on, Yulon looked for foreign partners, but it wasn't until 1956 that an American company, Willys, agreed to share technology. The next year Yulon began its long-lasting partnership with Nissan.

While the first Yulon model was a 1956 jeep, with engine production beginning in September of that year, passenger car assembly only started in 1960 with the Bluebird after an agreement with Nissan was signed in 1957. While primarily building Nissan models and other cars under license, Yulon has designed and produced at least one original family car, the 1986 Feeling 101. (Yulon began producing wholly original products again starting in 2009 with the debut of its Luxgen brand.) Until July 1994, when they changed to using Nissan badging, the license-built Nissan automobiles had all been branded Yue Loong (Yulon after 1992). The Nissan branded Cefiro A32 entered production in February 1996 and became Taiwan's best selling vehicle.

=== Assembler ===
With production bases located in China, Philippines and Taiwan, Yulon makes license-built versions of many automakers' models. The companies it manufactures in cooperation with include Chrysler, Geely, GM, Mercedes-Benz, Mitsubishi and Nissan. It assembles most of the vehicles from complete knock down kits.

The company has used its design and engineering expertise to localize its manufactures to suit Taiwanese tastes. Yulon began building Nissan automobiles under license in the 1960s. For many years the company worked with the Taiwanese government to develop an indigenous auto industry, aided by special tax reductions for modifying or creating their own designs. . Yulon's first attempt in doing so was a car called the Feeling 101, based on the Nissan Auster/Stanza of the period. The company followed up with facelifted versions such as the Feeling 102 and the Arex, but the Feeling was discontinued in 1995. Starting in July 1994, Yulon began using Nissan rather than Yulon badging on their products.

While Yulon continues to manufacture vehicles for sale on the Taiwanese market, as of 2010 it also imports Nissan, Infiniti, and Renault models for sale in the domestic Taiwanese market.

=== Nissan ===
Yulon has maintained a strong cooperative relationship with Nissan since 1957. After the 1985 passing of a Taiwanese act, the Automobile Industry Development Act (AIDA), Yulon accepted Nissan taking a 25% stake. Nissan maintained their ownership in Yulon until at least 2003 when a restructuring created Yulon-Nissan Motor Co Ltd, a separate company that focuses on complementing Nissan's mainland China activities with research, design, and manufacturing assistance.

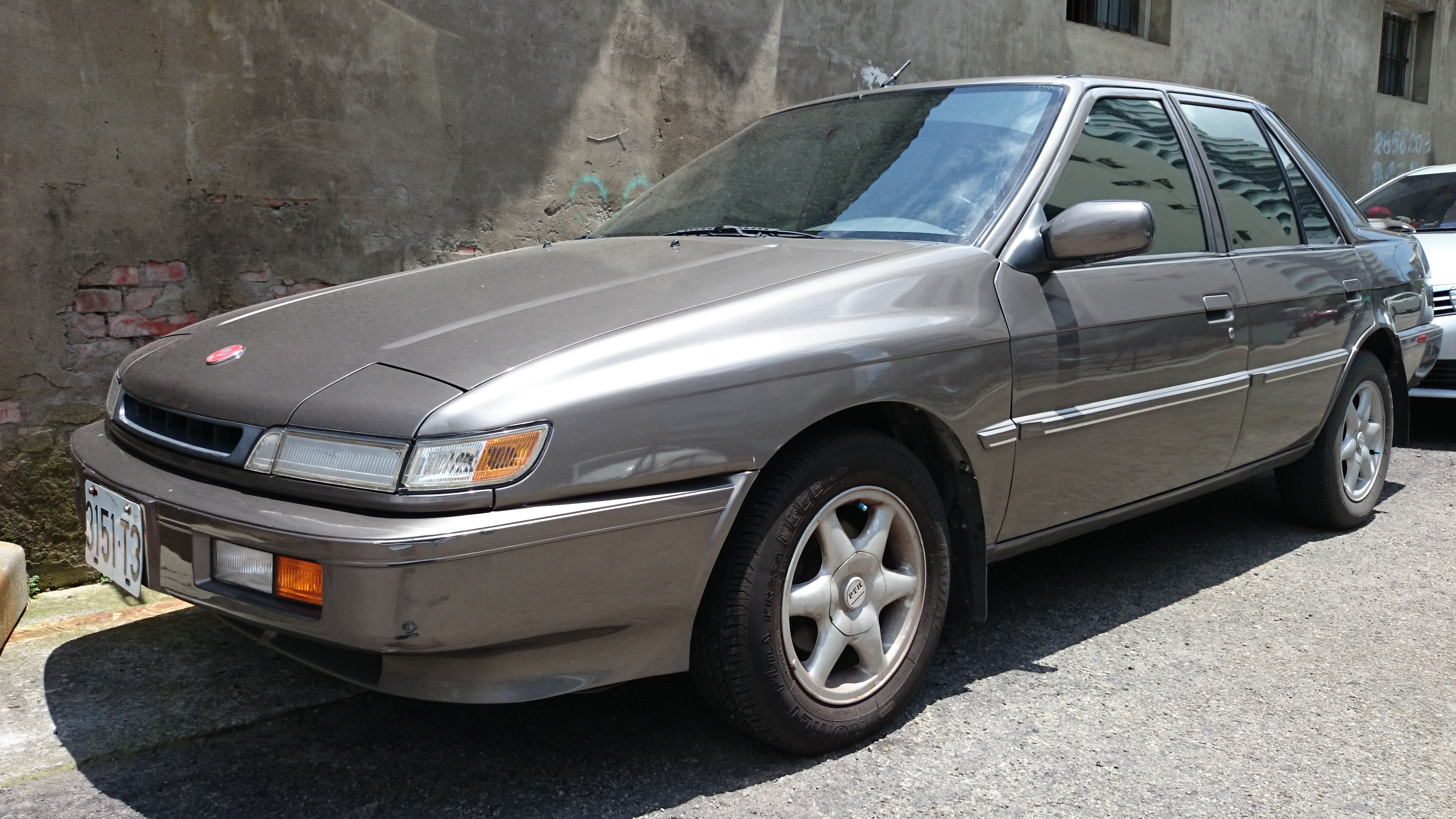
the exterior of a face-lift Yulon Arex

== Corporate Leadership ==
=== Chairmen/Chairwoman ===
- Vivian Shun-wen Wu (Madam Wu) (1953–2007)
- Kenneth Yen (2008–2018)
- Yen Chen Li-Yien (2018–present)

=== Chief Executive Officers/CEOs ===
- Kenneth Yen (1990–2018)
- Kuo-Hsing Hsu (2018–2024 and 2024–present)

== Brands ==
Yulon has marketed cars under three in-house brands: their cars were originally sold as Yue Loong (Yulon from 1992 until 1995), but the company switched to using Nissan badging in 1994. They then went on to create two new in-house brands: Luxgen (released in 2009), and Tobe (released in 2010, ended 2013).

=== Luxgen ===
The first Taiwanese auto brand, Luxgen (Chinese: 納智捷), was created by Yulon in 2008. On 18 August 2009, Yulon revealed the first car for its new Luxgen brand. Luxgen cars are developed under Yulon's R&D center HAITEC, using engines and transmissions provided by other companies. As of 2010, Luxgen products are sold in Taiwan and Oman.

=== China Motor Corporation (CMC) ===
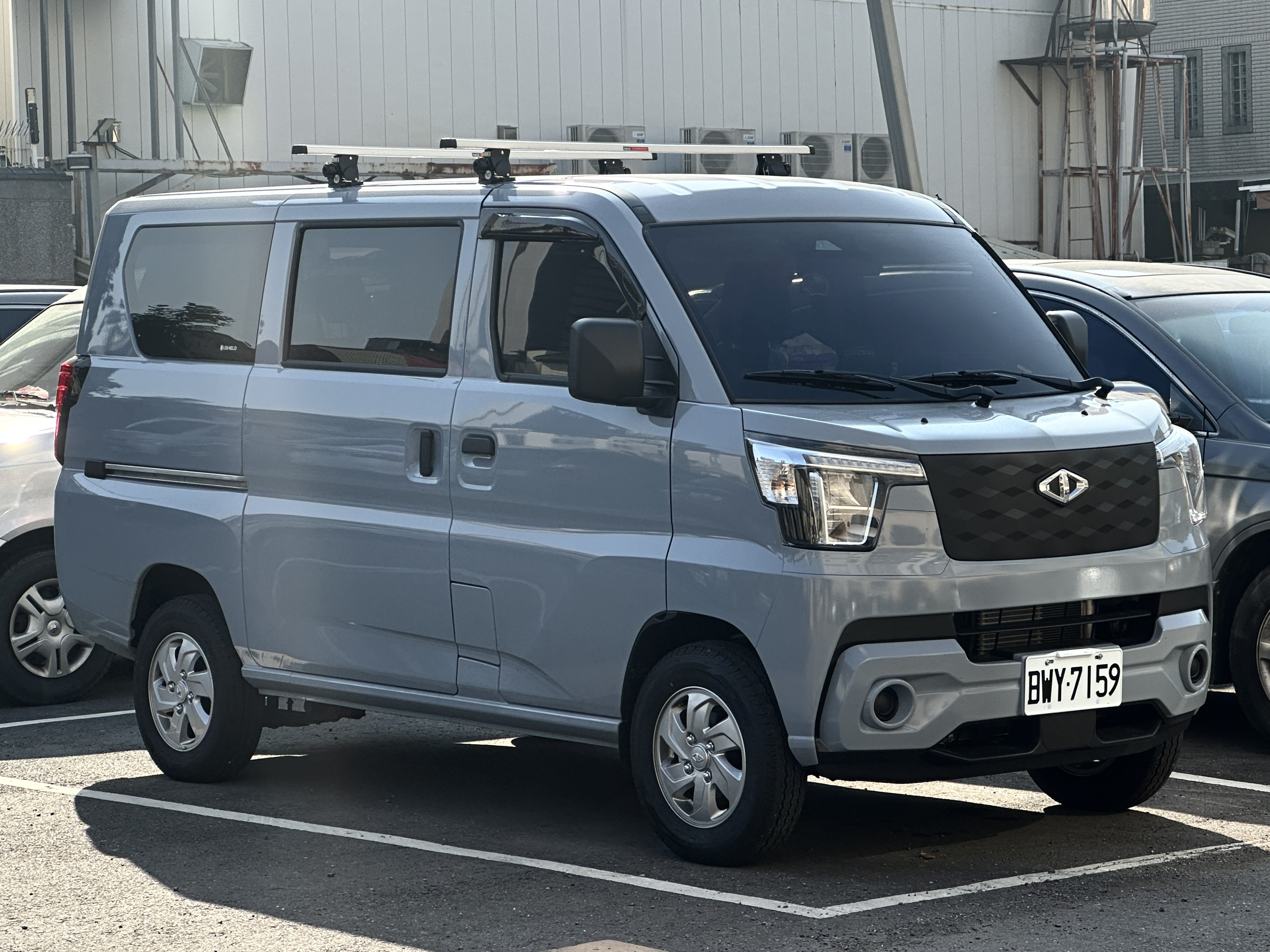
CMC J Space

=== Tobe ===
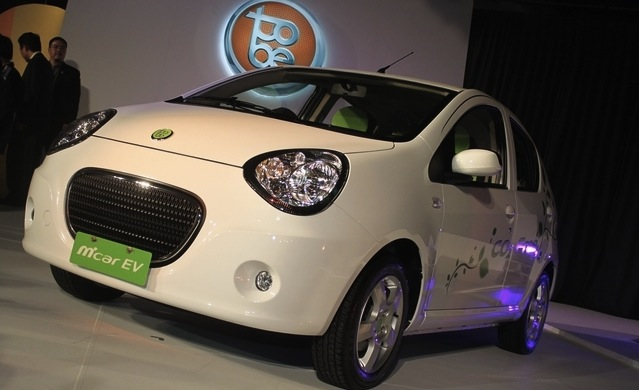
Tobe M'car EV

Yulon's second brand, Tobe (Chinese: 酷比), was established in 2009. From 2010 to 2013, Tobe sold its only model, a re-badged, re-designed Geely Panda/LC called the Tobe M’Car, in Taiwan and Vietnam. Plans to enter other emerging markets exist. However, poor sales and the brand image of being a rebadged Geely led to the end of the brand in 2013.

== Production bases ==
Yulon has a number of production bases in several countries, including China, Pakistan, Philippines until 2013, Taiwan and probably Thailand.

=== China ===
Initial production base investment in China for Yulon was buying 5% ownership in a Southern China production base in the 1990s. 2000 saw another, larger Chinese production base investment this time of 25%. The latter acquisition was probably in Fengsheng Motors, a Dongfeng Motors subsidiary.

As of 2003, Yulon had 25% ownership in the subsidiary yielding access to production bases in Huadu District, Guangzhou, Guangdong and Xiangfan, Hubei.

=== Philippines ===
In 1999 Yulon bought a 75% ownership of Nissan's newly built production base in Santa Rosa, Laguna state. This occurred after the Nissan Motor Company pulled out of the Philippines after the Asian market crises caused poor sales in the country. In 2013, it was announced that Nissan Motor Company of Japan will be again taking over Nissan in the Philippines. This comes after dismal sales and poor model updates from Yulon Taiwan, which ranked Nissan Philippines well below local rivals from Toyota, Mitsubishi, and Hyundai—not reflective of its ranking as no. 6 global carmaker.

== Joint ventures ==
All of Yulon's joint ventures in mainland China are with Dongfeng Motor.

=== Dongfeng Yulon ===
A joint venture with Chinese automaker Dongfeng, called Dongfeng Yulon (or Dongfeng Luxgen), was set up in 2009 and will manufacture Yulon's Luxgen models in China after the completion of a planned production base in Hangzhou in 2011. The cars will be sold in China. On July 8, 2019, Luxgen signed MoU with Mongolian company AGT Auto to build its first car assembly factory in Mongolia. Dongfeng Yulon entered bankruptcy in 2020.

=== Fengshen Automobile ===
In 2003, Yulon had part ownership in a subsidiary of Dongfeng Motor, Fengshen Automobile Co Ltd.

== See also ==
- List of companies of Taiwan
- List of Taiwanese automakers
- List of Nissan vehicles Yulon Motors has built under license
- List of motor scooter manufacturers and brands
