= Vivian Shun-wen Wu =

Taiwanese businesswoman (1913–2008)

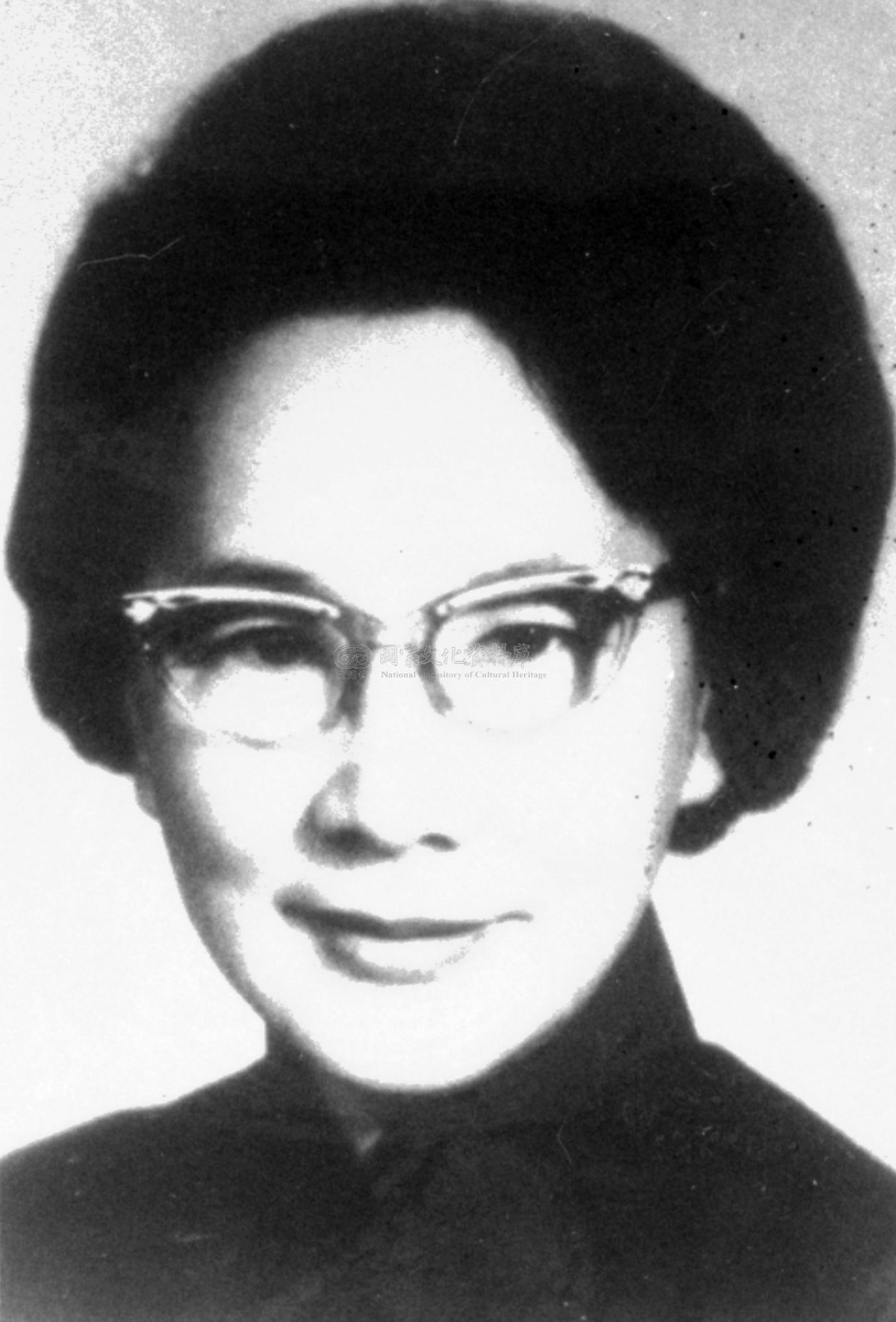
Vivian Wu

Vivian Shun-wen Wu (Chinese: 吳舜文; 5 December 1913 – 9 August 2008), born in Changzhou, Jiangsu, China, was a prominent Taiwanese businesswoman. She was the former chairwoman of Yulon Motor, a Taiwan-based automaker which is known for building Nissan-brand automobiles. Wu also served as the chairwoman of Tai Yuen Textile, a textile producer, and China Motor, another automaker partly owned by Mitsubishi Motors.

Wu's father Woo Ching-yuen 吳慶運 was a businessman in the textile industry. She graduated from the Saint John's University, Shanghai, and received her master's degree at Columbia University. Her husband Yen Ching-ling, who moved to Taiwan with Wu in 1948, was the founder of Yulon. Wu died in Taipei on 9 August 2008, and her son Kenneth Yen succeeded Wu in several executive positions.
