= Foxtron Model E =

Overview
- Designer: Foxtron; Pininfarina

Body and chassis
- Body style: Sedan
- Layout: D4
- Platform: Foxtron MIH
- Related: Luxgen n7 (Model C)

Powertrain
- Electric range: 750 km (470 mi)

Dimensions
- Wheelbase: 3,100 mm (122.0 in)
- Length: 5,100 mm (200.8 in)

The Foxtron Model E is a battery electric vehicle designed by Foxtron, a joint venture of Foxconn and Yulon Motor, using the same Foxtron MIH platform as the Foxtron Model C sport utility vehicle and Foxtron Model B crossover utility vehicle. The prototype luxury sedan was styled by Pininfarina and unveiled in October 2021.

== History ==
The prototype Model E was shown at Hon Hai Tech Day on October 18, 2021; Foxconn founder Terry Gou drove it onto the stage. The prototype was shown later at the International Motor Expo Hong Kong (IMXHK) that December.

In 2022, Foxconn CEO Liu Yangwei announced the Model E would begin production in early 2024.

== Design ==
The prototype shown in 2021 had a claimed range of 750 km (470 mi) with maximum combined output of 550 kW (740 hp; 750 PS) and 750 N⋅m (550 lbf⋅ft) from the two traction motors, split 150 kW (200 hp; 200 PS) in the front and 400 kW (540 hp; 540 PS) in the rear. Acceleration from 0 to 100 km/h (62 mph) is 2.8 seconds.

It uses smart glass windows for privacy and sun protection. The rear seat is designed to be a "mobile office", featuring a screen with connectivity to handheld devices.
