= Foxtron =

Taiwanese electric vehicle manufacturer

Foxtron Inc.
- Type: Joint venture
- Traded as: TWSE: 2258
- Founded: 7 February 2020; 6 years ago
- Headquarters: Xindian District, New Taipei City, Taiwan
- Key people: Andy Lee (chairman); Adam Chen (CEO)
- Owner: Foxconn (45.6%); Yulon (43.8%)
- Website: https://www.foxtronev.com/

Foxtron Inc. or Foxtron Vehicle Technologies is a Taiwanese manufacturer of electric cars and buses based in Taipei, operating since 2020 as a joint venture between the technology company Foxconn and the car company Yulon.

== History ==
In February 2020, Taiwanese electronic components giant Foxconn and local car manufacturer Yulon agreed to establish a joint venture company. Previously, Foxconn had limited involvement in the automotive industry only as a component supplier or investor, and decided to actively enter it as a manufacturer. Yulon's automotive component development and manufacturing subsidiary Hua-Chuang Automobile Information Technical Center Company (HAITEC) would invest NT$7.632 billion and hold a 49% share, while Foxconn would invest NT$7.944 B for a 51% share. Yulon previously had announced a joint venture with Fiat Chrysler Automobiles on 16 January 2020. The goal was to develop electric cars.

The joint venture's first product was the MIH (Mobility in Harmony) open EV platform, unveiled in October 2020 at the annual Hon Hai Technology Day (HHTD). MIH is an "open source" software and hardware platform for developing battery electric vehicles (EV). The hardware portion of MIH is a typical EV skateboard chassis with modular options for front-, rear-, or all-wheel drive; the software portion of the MIH platform has "functions and characteristics [that] can be changed and improved through software upgrades after the car is delivered", according to Foxconn chairman Liu Yangwei. The joint venture set a goal to supply components and services for 10% of EVs worldwide by 2027.

The Foxtron joint venture was formed that November, using an outsourcing business model which the company calls Commissioned (or Contract) Design and Manufacturing Service (CDMS), under which Foxtron assumes the vehicle engineering design, styling, component supply chain management, and production management roles, while manufacturing is performed by another company. This leaves the automobile manufacturer responsible solely for marketing and after-sales service.

Sources leaked the joint venture's first EV would be a transit bus in February 2021. In mid-October 2021, during the next HHTD, held in the capital of Taiwan, Taipei, the Foxtron brand was officially launched with a goal to launch a range of electric cars and buses manufactured in Thailand starting from 2023. At HHTD 2021, Foxtron showed three prototype EVs: the Model C crossover utility vehicle, the Model T bus, and the high-end Model E sedan, which was styled by the Italian studio Pininfarina. The start of trial testing of the Model T bus was scheduled for 2022; the first buses were delivered to transit agencies in the southern Taiwan cities of Kaohsiung and Tainan in March and October 2022 and one was imported to Bali to transport guests for the G20 Summit that November.

Foxconn purchased the former Lordstown Assembly factory in Lordstown, Ohio from Lordstown Motors in May 2022, with plans for Foxconn to take over assembly of the Lordstown Endurance and enter into a new joint venture to develop MIH-based vehicles. At HHTD22 in October 2022, Foxtron presented two concepts: an affordable urban hatchback named the Model B, also styled by Pininfarina, and the Model V pickup truck, along with the production version of the Model C concept from HHTD21, which will be produced and marketed in Taiwan by Yulon's subsidiary Luxgen as the n^{7}, starting in 2023. Under the CDMS model, Foxtron CEO Andy Lee described the Luxgen n7 as having been designed by Foxtron (shown as the Model C), with manufacturing handled by Yulon at its factory in Miaoli, and delivery to Luxgen performed by Foxtron. Ed Hightower, the CEO of Lordstown, flew to Taiwan in 2022, seeking to meet with Foxtron executives and make a deal to bring production of a mid-size SUV to the Lordstown plant, but was denied an audience and flew back to Detroit after two weeks. In November 2022, Foxtron broke ground for a new factory in Thailand, which is intended for MIH-based EV production. The company sustained financial losses in 2021 and 2022.

In October 2023, at the annual HHTD event, Liu Yangwei appeared with Nvidia CEO Jensen Huang and the production version of the Model B; they announced the companies would build "AI factories" to develop autonomous driving software. In addition, the Model N panel van was unveiled. Foxtron went public on Monday, 20 November 2023; shares on the Taiwan Stock Exchange closed down 9% on the first day of trading, amid concerns the demand for EVs was slowing. In February 2024, Foxtron exhibited the production Model B to the European public, accompanied by representatives of the model's designers, the Italian studio Pininfarina.

For HHTD 2024, Foxtron debuted two new vehicles: the Model D and the Model U. Model D is a "Lifestyle Multipurpose Utility Vehicle" styled by Pininfarina, and Model U is a mid-sized bus derived from the Model T, designed for narrow streets and long routes.

In December 2025, Foxtron agreed to acquire Luxgen, a Taiwanese auto manufacturer and subsidiary of Yulon, for NT$787,600,000 pending Fair Trade Commission approval. The deal is expected to close in the first quarter of 2026.

== Products ==
=== MIH open platform ===
The Foxtron MIH open platform is a modular skateboard chassis which carries the traction battery under the cabin floor, within the wheelbase of the vehicle. Front-, rear-, or all-wheel drive are possible using one or two traction motor units. Steering, braking, and vehicle speed/acceleration are controlled "by-wire", facilitating the development of autonomous driving software. It is designed to accommodate vehicle segments from B through E using a variety of lengths, widths, and heights.

Foxtron offers a software development kit for the platform named "EVKit". The onboard software is designed to be upgradable and interface with vehicle subsystem controllers, including the Vehicle Control Unit (powertrain), Electronic Stability Control (braking), Electric Power Steering, and Body Component Module (doors); it receives inputs from various modules that report vehicle states and other sensors which may include cameras, radar, and/or LiDAR.

Vehicles developed by Foxtron using the MIH platform are intended to serve as reference designs for automotive OEMs to rebrand and market under their own marque; for example, the Foxtron Model C is sold as the Luxgen n7.

After the MIH Alliance was announced with the launch of the MIH platform in October 2020, it was spun off as the Mobility in Harmony Consortium in 2021, led by CEO Jack Cheng. The MIH Consortium has since developed an open-access small EV reference platform for A-segment cars, known as Project X.

=== Vehicles ===
- Foxtron Model E (2021)
- Foxtron Model C (2021), began production in 2023 as the Luxgen n7
- Foxtron Model T (2021)
- Foxtron Model B (2022), began production in 2025 as the Foxtron Bria
- Foxtron Model V (2022)
- Foxtron Model N (2023)
- Foxtron Model D (2024)
- Foxtron Model U (2024)
- Foxtron Model A Concept (2024)
- Foxtron Model A (2025)
- Foxtron Model A+ (2026)
- Foxtron Model K (2026)
- Foxtron Model K+ (2026)
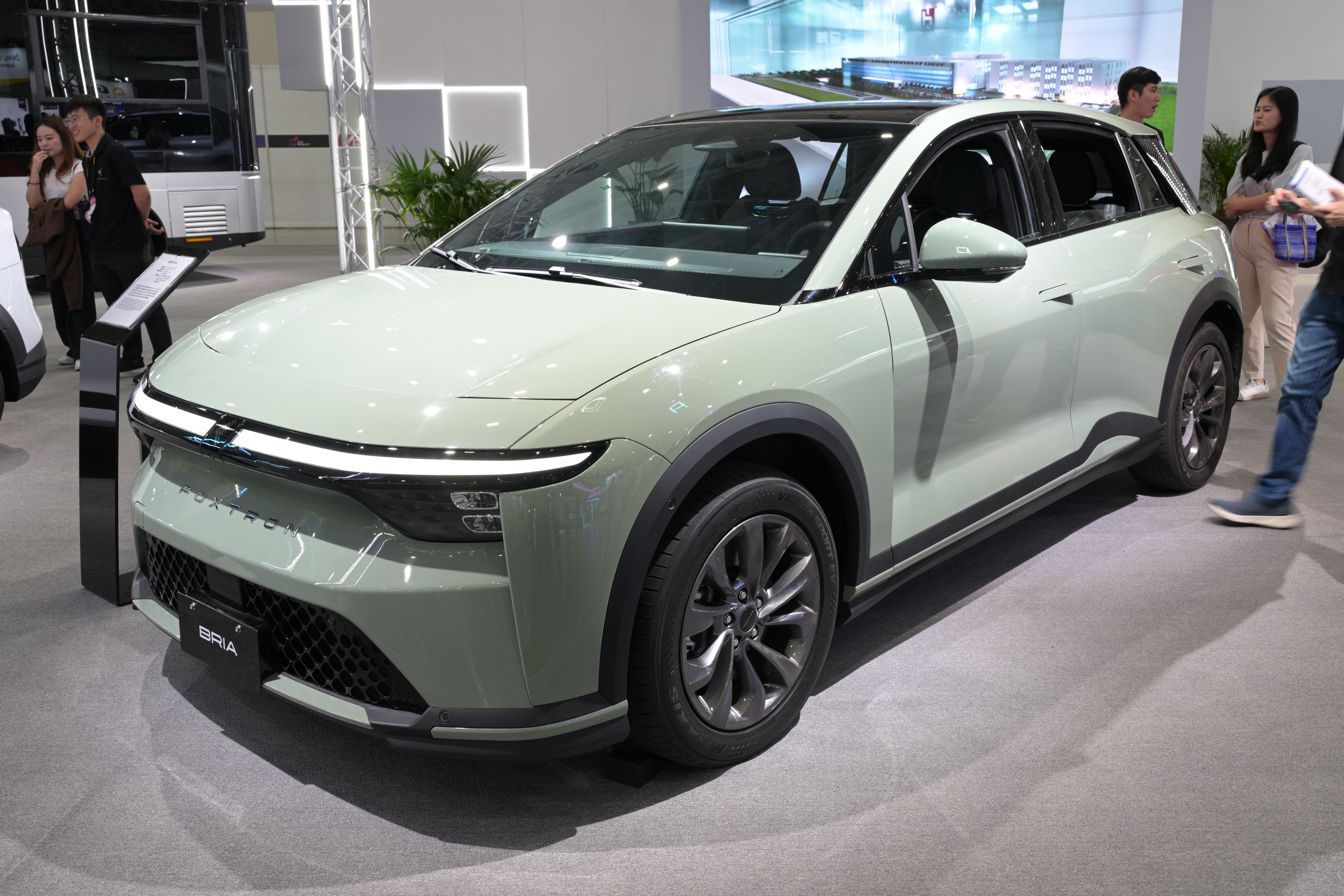
Foxtron Bria

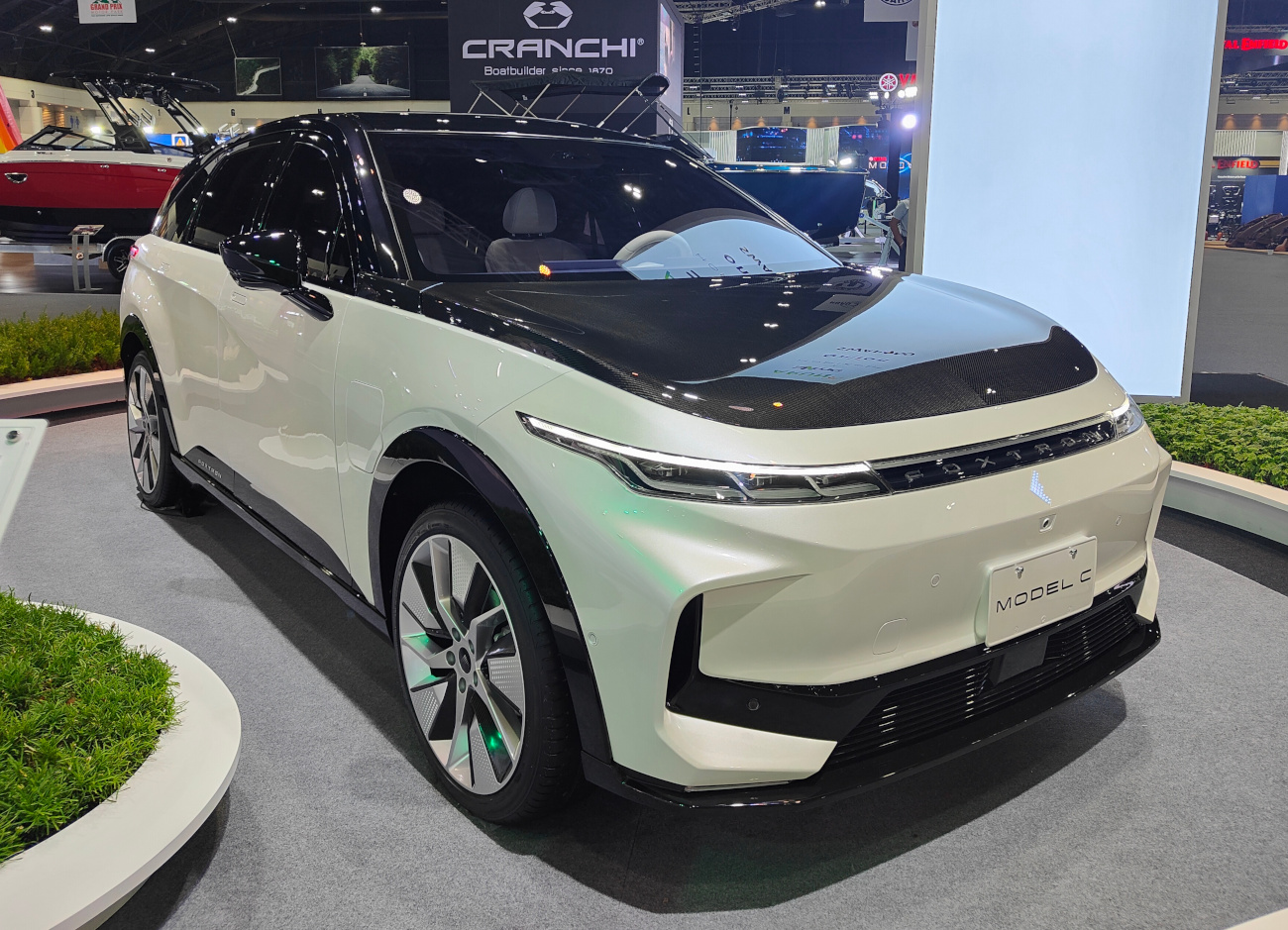
Foxtron Model C

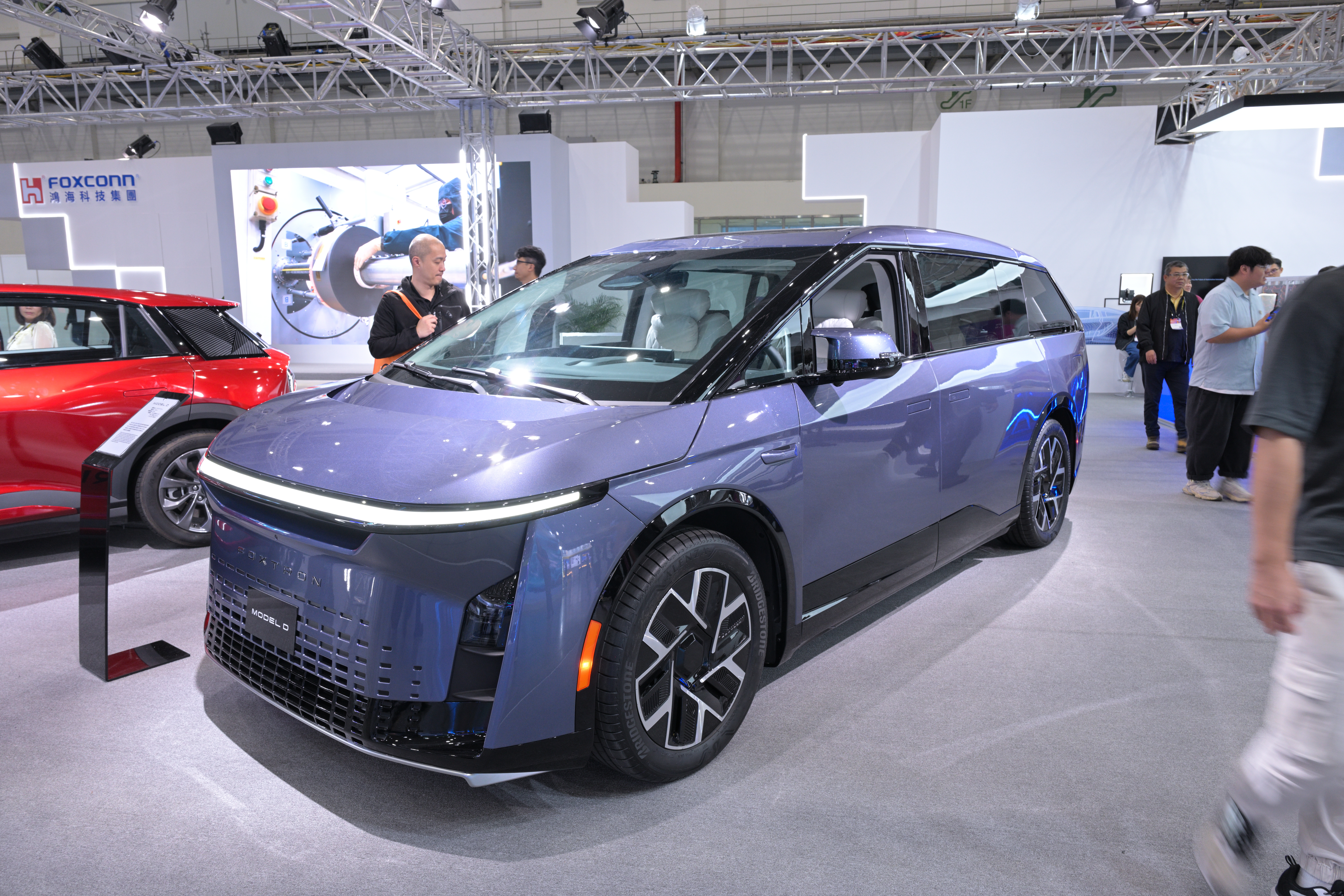
Foxtron Model D

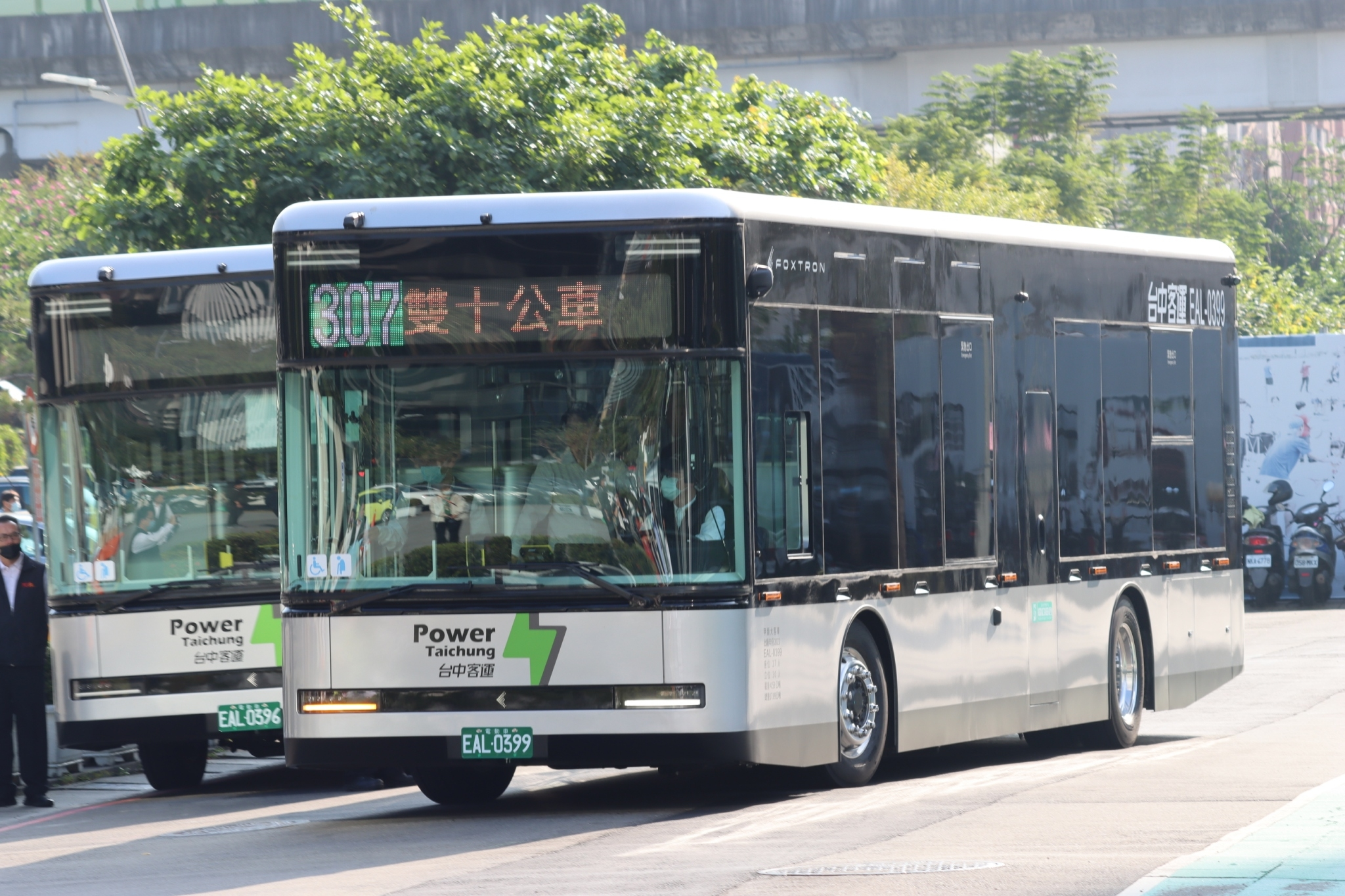
Foxtron Model T
