= Foxtron Model T =

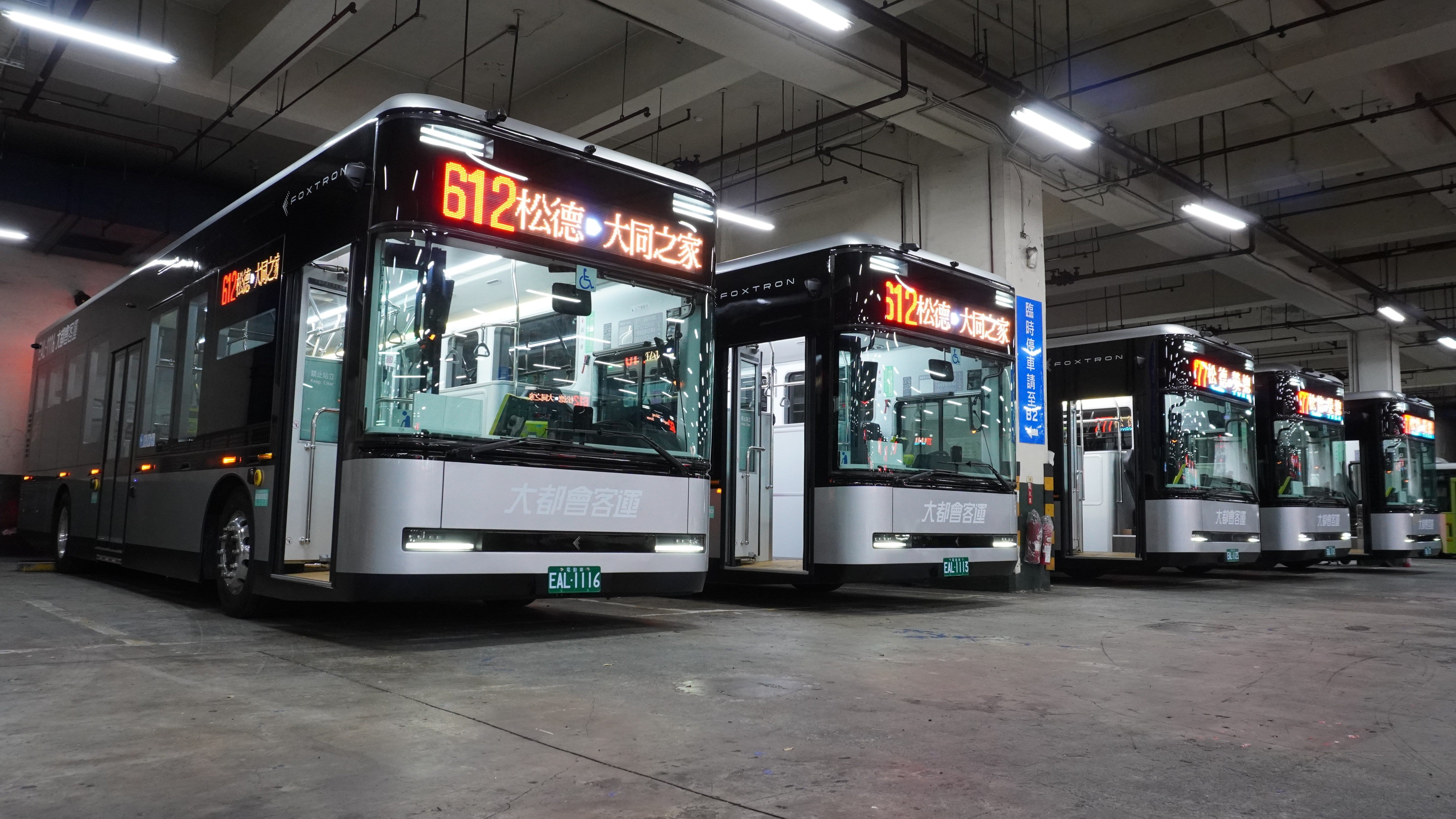

Overview
- Manufacturer: Foxtron
- Production: 2022–present

Body and chassis
- Platform: MIH Open Platform

Powertrain
- Battery: 400 kWh
- Electric range: 400 km (250 mi)
- Plug-in charging: CCS1, up to 130 kW

Dimensions
- Wheelbase: 6,000 mm (236.2 in)
- Length: 12,082 mm (475.7 in)
- Width: 2,500 mm (98.4 in)
- Height: 3,279 mm (129.1 in)
- Curb weight: 13,300 kg (29,321 lb)

The Foxtron Model T is a battery electric bus produced by Foxtron, a joint venture of Foxconn and Yulon Motor, as the first commercial vehicle developed on the MIH Open Platform. The prototype was unveiled in October 2021 and the first production unit was delivered to Kaohsiung Bus in March 2022.

== History ==
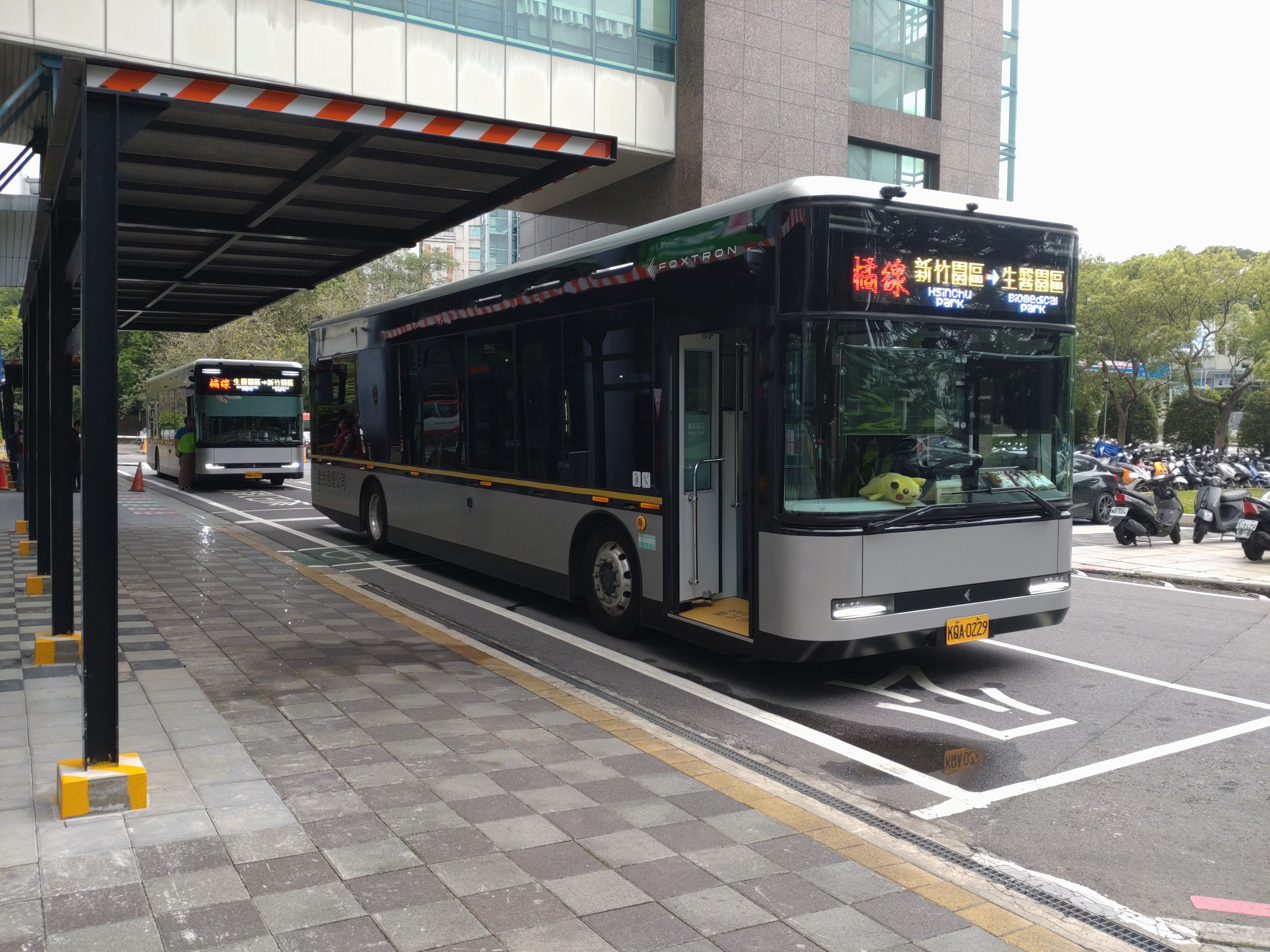
Foxtron Model T Front view

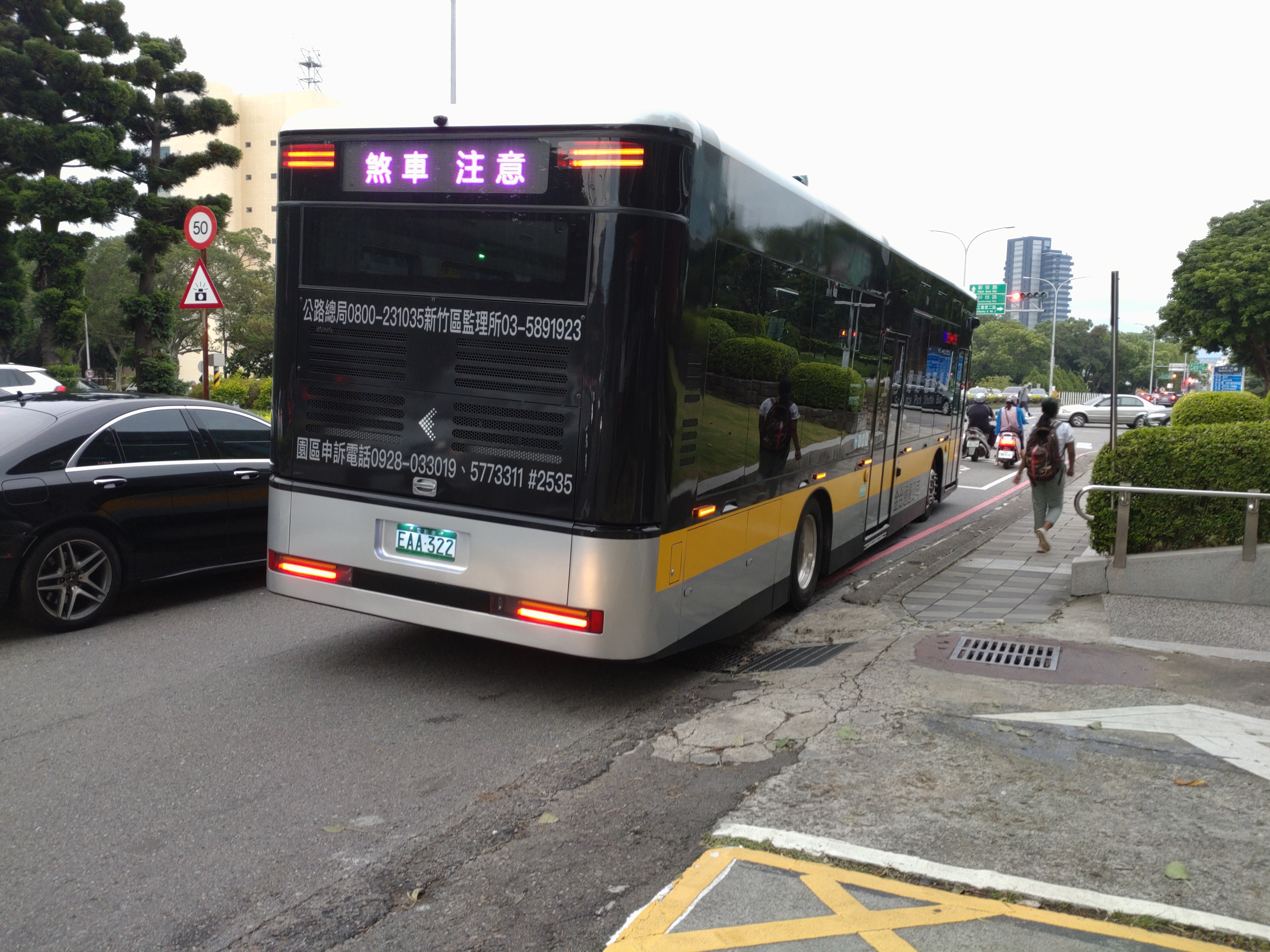
Foxtron Model T rear view

In July 2021, Foxtron signed a memorandum of understanding with San-Ti Group (三地集團) and its subsidiaries, Kaohsiung Bus (高雄客運) and North-Star Petroleum (北基國際), to deploy E-bus electric vehicles. Under the agreement, Kaohsiung Bus would the initial recipient, while North-Star, the group's energy solutions division, would take charge of building and deploying the charging infrastructure. A prototype unit was unveiled that October, and officially designated as the Model T.The first unit was delivered to Kaohsiung Bus in March 2022, with production capacity projected to reach up to 150 buses by the end of the year.

The Model T received Japan's Good Design Award in 2022, presneted by the Japan Institute of Design Promotion. By the end of 2023, Model T buses had entered service in Kaohsiung, Taipei, Tainan, Taitung, Taichung, and Kinmen County.

== Design ==
Foxtron claims the Model T has a range of 400 km (250 mi) and can traverse a maximum grade of 25 percent while fully loaded, with a top speed of 120 km/h (75 mph). For that range, the traction battery has a storage capacity of 400 kW-hr, with a maximum charging rate of 130 kW. It is based on the MIH Open Platform.

== Operators ==
=== Taiwan ===
- Taipei Bus
- Metropolitan Transport Corporation
- San Chung Bus
- Taoyuan Bus
- Hsinchu Science Park Shuttle Bus
- Taichung Bus
- Yuanlin Bus
- Tainan Bus
- Singing Bus
- Kaohsiung Bus
- Puyuma Transportation
- Bus Management Office of Kinmen

=== Indonesia ===
- Indika Energy
