= Skateboard (automotive platform) =

Type of chassis configuration used in battery electric vehicles

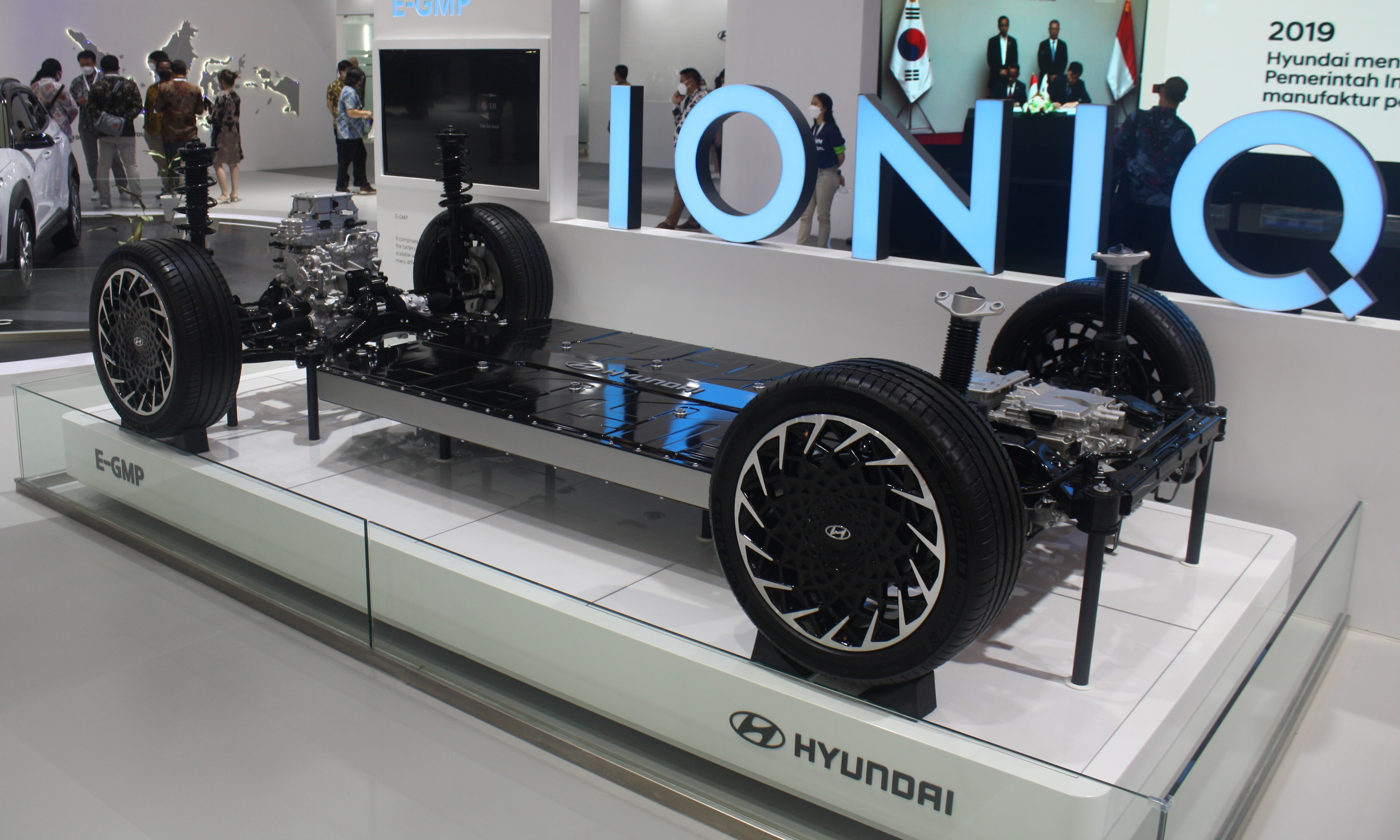
Hyundai E-GMP skateboard platform

A skateboard is a type of configuration for automotive chassis, used for automotive platforms of battery electric vehicles. The skateboard chassis includes a base structure or a platform, which houses the batteries, electric motors and other electronic components fundamental to an electric vehicle.

A skateboard chassis cuts down the cost and complexity of manufacturing and production of electric vehicles, as it is a self-contained platform, with all the necessary driving and electronic components integrated into it, and which can be mounted with a variety of bodies after scaling them into various sizes. The skateboard allows an automaker to design and manufacture vehicles in several vehicle categories and body segments without engineering each one independently.

== Examples ==
Typical "skateboard" layout with the battery as floor and a motor at one or both axles

- Cenntro iChassis
- Gaussin Road truck skateboard
- Bollinger Skateboard, the chassis basis for Bollinger's vehicles, and a product sold to coachbuilders.
- Foxconn MIH, a platform developed by Foxconn for use by vehicle manufacturers and not itself.
- General Motors BEV3 platform
- Hyundai E-GMP
- REE Automotive P7 platform
- Rivian Skateboard
- Geely SEA platform
- Tesla Skateboard, a platform family based on the skateboard chassis configuration, used for the Model S/X and Model 3/Y sub-platforms.
- VIA Motors VDRIVEÔäó Skateboard
- Volkswagen Group MEB platform
- XPeng SEPA (Smart Electric Platform Architecture).
- Lucid Air Lucid Air LEAP Platform (Lucid Electric Advanced Platform).
- Zero Labs Classic Electric Platform.
- Canoo
- PIX Moving

== See also ==
- Modular vehicle
