= Modular vehicle =

Vehicle term

A modular vehicle is one in which substantial components of the vehicle are interchangeable. This modularity is intended to make repairs and maintenance easier or to allow the vehicle to be reconfigured to suit different functions.

Another application of modular vehicle design is to enable the exchange of batteries in an electric vehicle.

In a modular electric vehicle, the power system, wheels, and suspension can be contained in a single module or chassis. When the batteries need recharging, the vehicle's body is lifted off and placed onto a fresh power module. By using this Modular Vehicle system, the vehicle's batteries do not have to be removed or reinstalled, and their connections remain intact.

== History of the modern modular vehicle ==
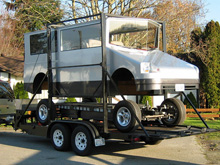
The Ridek III body and chassis can be separated to change body styles or to put the same body on a chassis with fully charged batteries.

The world's first road-licensed quick-change modular electric vehicle, based on a patent awarded to Dr Gordon E Dower in 2000, was shown at the World Electric Vehicle Association 2003 Electric Vehicle Symposium EVS-20 in Long Beach, California, USA.

Dower described the vehicle's two parts as its motorized deck, shortened to Modek, and its "containing module" or Ridon. When attached to each other, the vehicle thus formed was dubbed the Ridek. Mechanical connections between the modules for braking and steering automatically engage when the body is lowered onto the chassis.

In 2004, General Motors attempted to patent a modular vehicle called Autonomy, but the attempt was unsuccessful because Dower's patent already existed.

A team at GM did, however, continue to work on Autonomy, which was intended to be powered by a hydrogen fuel cell. They unveiled a non-drivable version of their modular vehicle in January 2002 at the Detroit Auto Show. GM unveiled a drivable prototype, called Hy-wire at the Paris Auto Show in September 2002. The name referred to the Hydrogen fuel and the "Drive by wire" system that electronically connected the vehicle modules for steering, braking, and controlling the four wheel motors. Hy-wire did not go into production.

In the 2010s, a number of modular platforms were developed by car manufacturers. Geely Auto developed the Compact Modular Architecture platform (2017), B-segment Modular Architecture platform (2018), and Sustainable Experience Architecture platform (2021). PSA Group and Dongfeng developed the Common Modular Platform (2018)

== Flexibility ==
Modular vehicles make it possible to use different types of bodies, e.g., sedan, sports car, or pickup truck, on one standardized chassis.

Also, the modular chassis, with its batteries and motor, is relatively easy to work on since there is no vehicle body to impede access.

== See also ==
- Car platform
- Electric vehicles
- Modular design
- Rolling chassis
- Skateboard (automotive platform)
