= Luxgen n7 =

Battery electric compact crossover SUV

Luxgen n^{7}
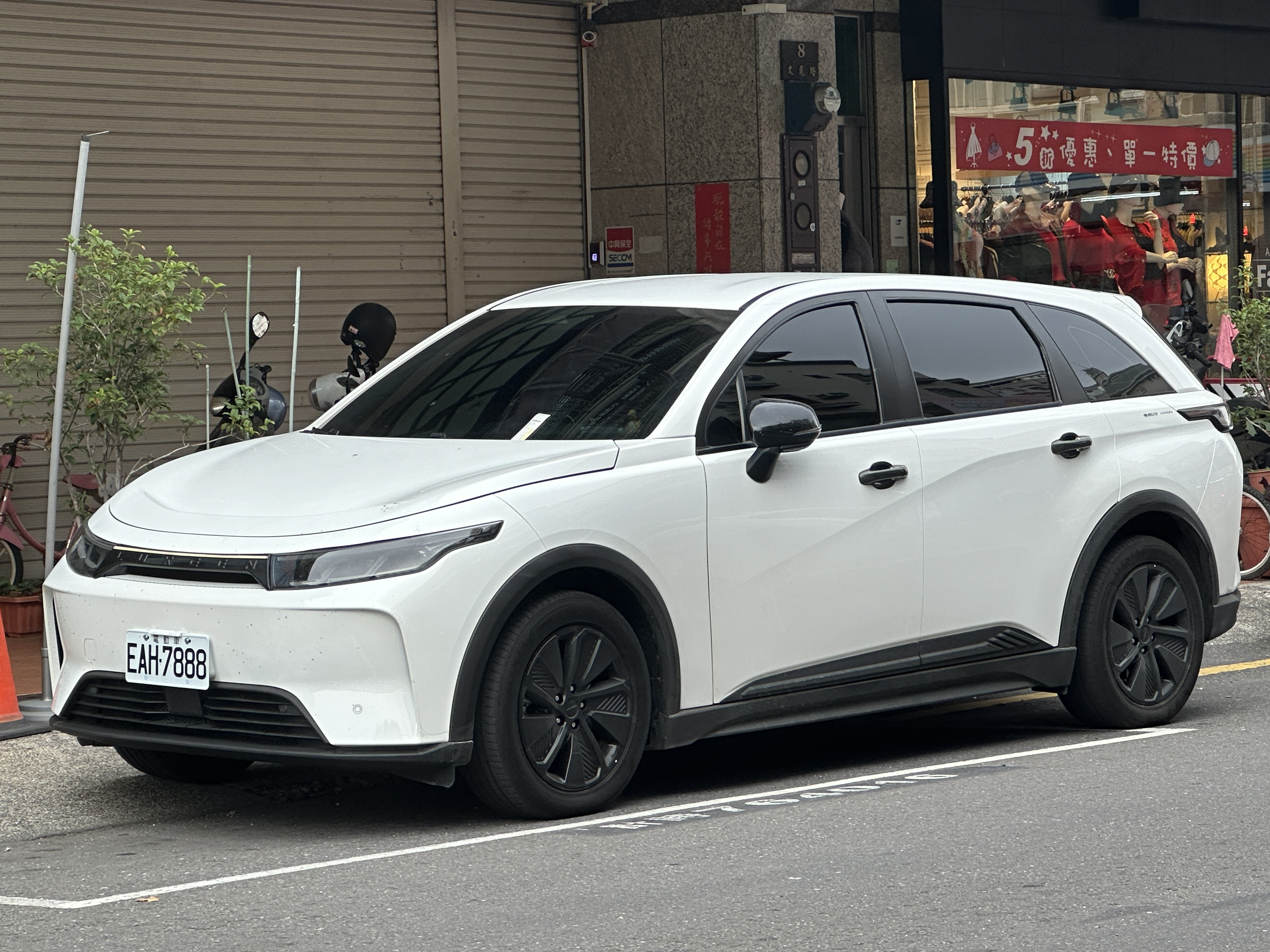

Overview
- Manufacturer: Luxgen; Foxtron (2026–present)
- Also called: Foxtron Model C (concept); Foxtron Cavira (2026–present)
- Production: 2023–present
- Assembly: Taiwan: Miaoli

Body and chassis
- Class: Compact SUV
- Body style: 5-door crossover SUV
- Layout: Rear-motor, rear-wheel-drive; Dual-motor, all-wheel-drive
- Platform: Foxtron MIH
- Related: Foxtron Bria

Powertrain
- Electric motor: Permanent-magnet synchronous motor
- Power output: Rear-wheel-drive: 172 kW (231 hp; 234 PS); All-wheel-drive: 340 kW (456 hp; 462 PS)
- Transmission: Single-speed reduction gear, 1:9.07
- Battery: 400 V LiFePO_{4}, 60 kW-hr
- Electric range: 489–505 km (304–314 mi) (NEDC)
- Plug-in charging: J1772 / CCS1; 6.6 kW (AC); 135 kW (DC)

Dimensions
- Wheelbase: 2,920 mm (115.0 in)
- Length: 4,695 mm (184.8 in)
- Width: 1,895 mm (74.6 in)
- Height: 1,625 mm (64.0 in)
- Curb weight: 1,935–1,975 kg (4,266–4,354 lb)

The Luxgen n7 (stylized with a superscript number as n^{7}) is a battery electric compact SUV produced by the Taiwanese car company Luxgen, approximately the same size as the conventionally powered Luxgen URX.

It was developed by Foxtron, a joint venture established in 2020 between Luxgen parent Yulon and Hon Hai Precision, better known as Foxconn. The first public viewing of the concept vehicle, the Foxtron Model C, was in October 2021, and the n7 was announced as the retail version in October 2022; production began in late 2023.

== Overview ==
The Foxtron Model C was unveiled at the second annual Hon Hai Tech Day in October 2021, with a production version shown one year later, which would be marketed in Taiwan as the Luxgen n7. Preorder sales were scheduled to start in October 2022, with production to commence in November 2023; the first vehicles were delivered to retail customers by mid-January 2024.

By September 2023, The Luxgen had received 20,000–25,000 preorders for the n7; at that time, the n7 had the lowest starting price of any electric automobile in Taiwan. By November, there were more than 9,100 confirmed preorders. It is expected the Model C or a derivative will be marketed in southeast Asia and the United States by the third quarter of 2025.

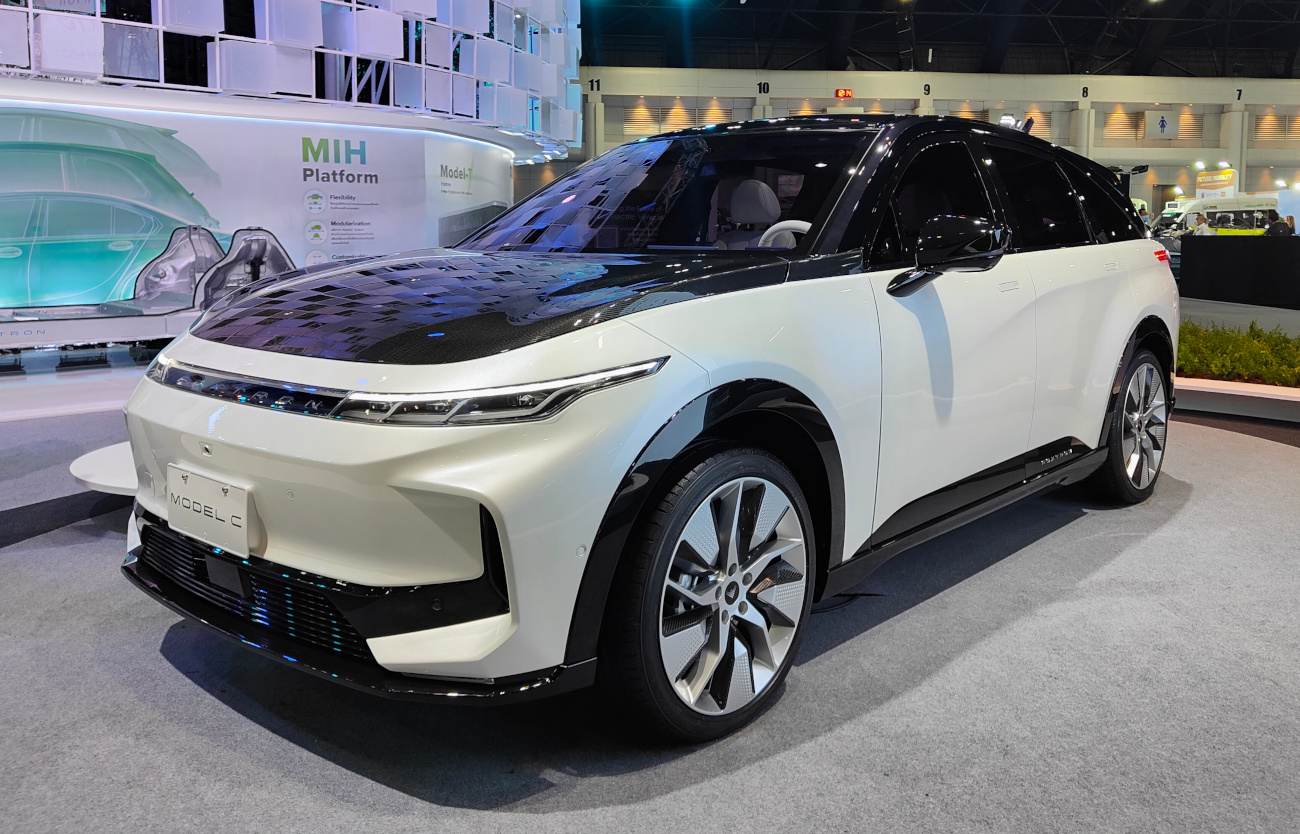
The Foxtron Model C at Bangkok Motor Show (March 2022).

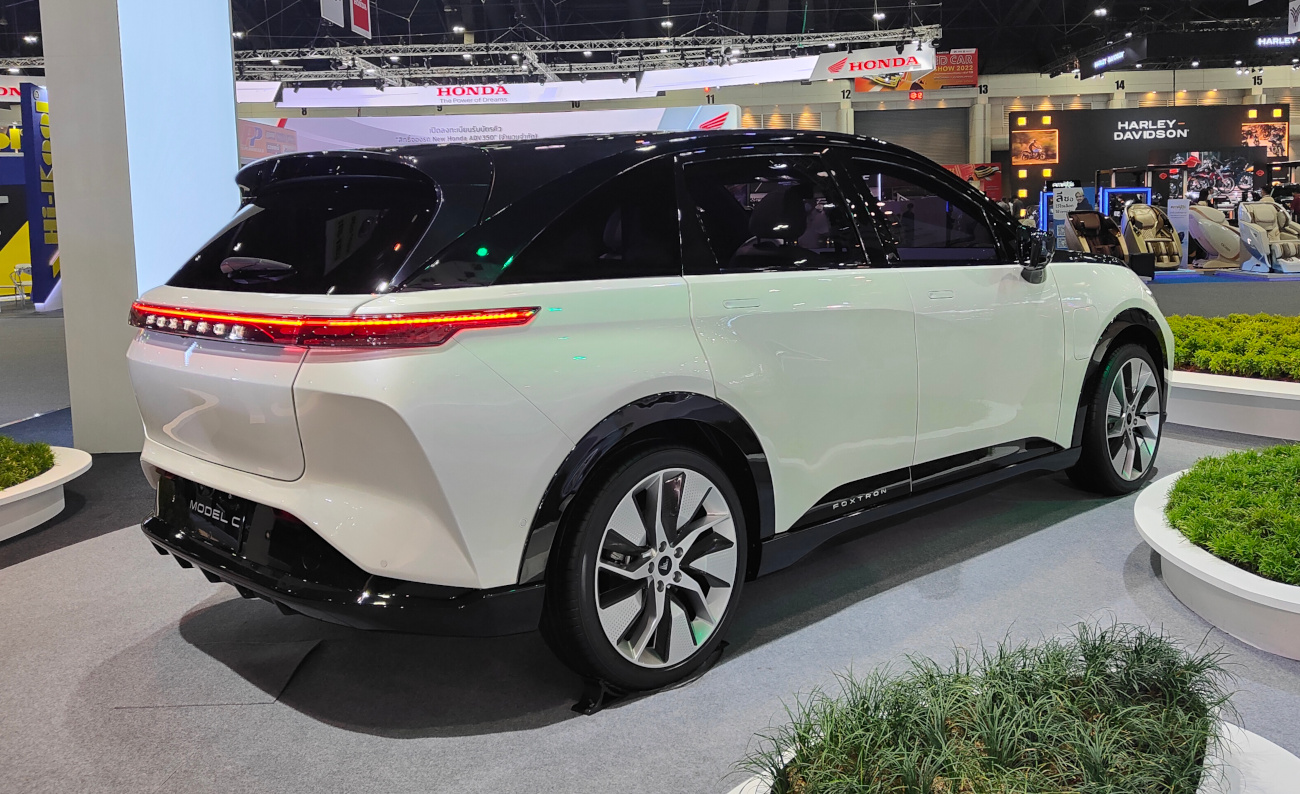
Rear view

=== Design ===
The Luxgen n7 is based on the Foxtron MIH platform, which is billed as an "open source" kit to develop electric vehicles and autonomous driving technologies; in exchange for access to the MIH platform, automotive companies will contract all production to Foxconn. MIH, which stands for "Mobility in Harmony", was announced in 2020. MIH operations are managed by Foxtron Vehicle Technologies, a joint venture between Foxtron and the Yulon R&D center, Hua-chuang Automobile Information Technical Center (HAITEC). Styling and engineering design were handled by Foxtron, which also assumes responsibility for the component supply chain management and production management, while Yulon manufactures the vehicles in its Miaoli factory.

External dimensions are similar to the Luxgen URX, but the n7 has a wheelbase that is longer by 200 mm (7.9 in).

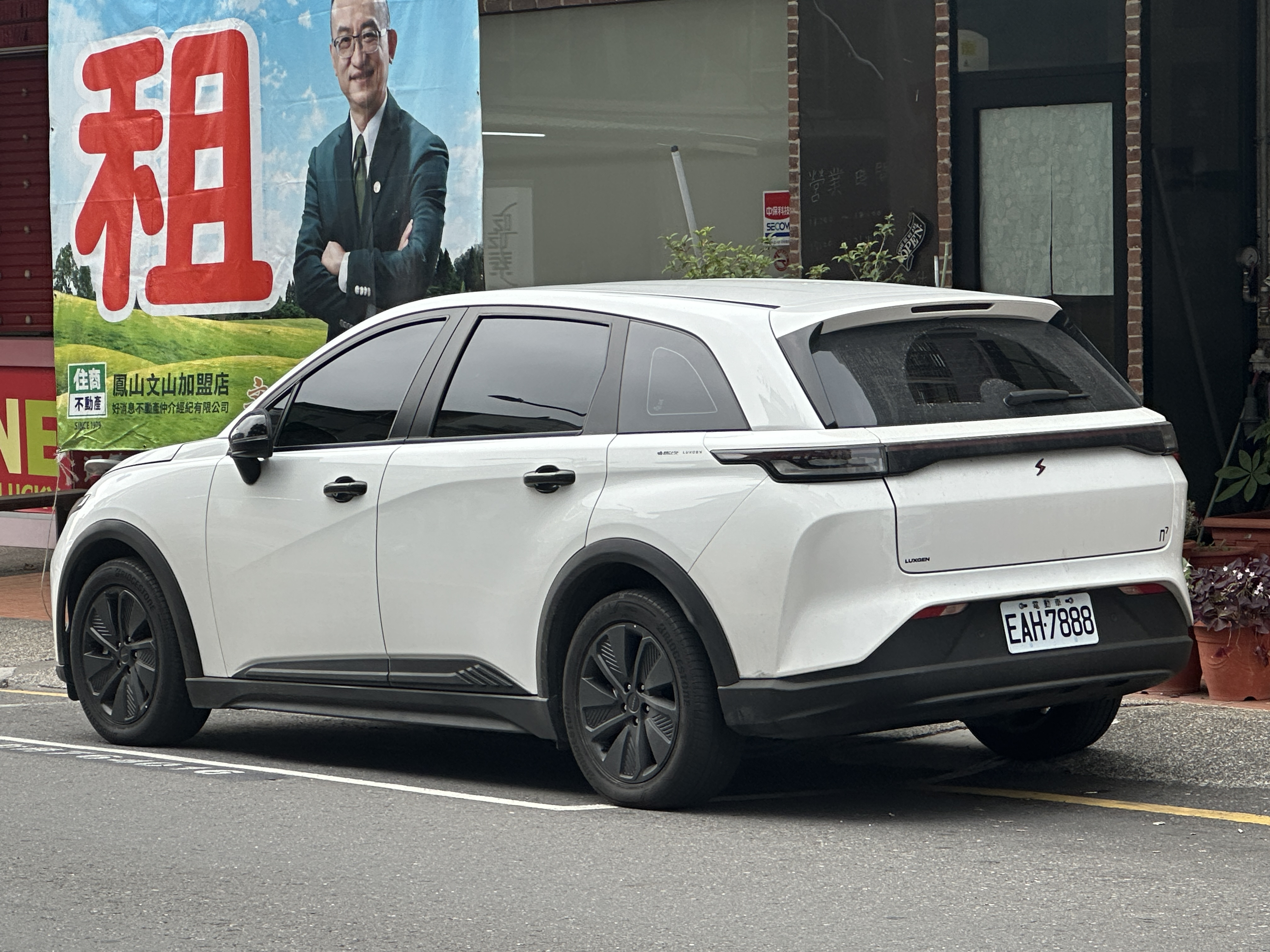
Rear view

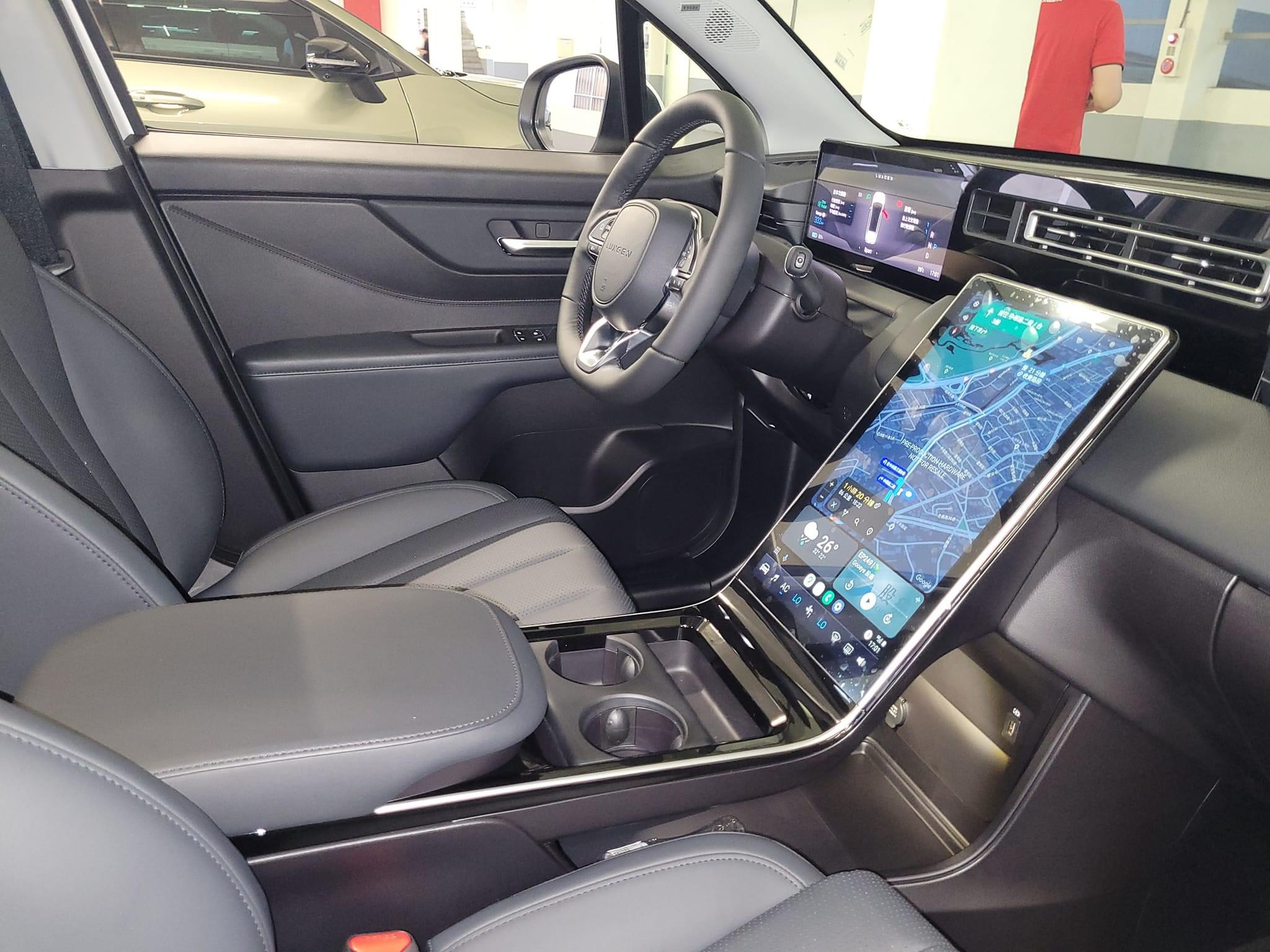
Interior

== Powertrain ==
The final production versions shown initially in October 2023 were equipped with a single-motor, rear-wheel-drive chassis and a standard-range battery option, estimated at 60 kWh capacity. In addition, a long-range single-motor model fitted with a larger battery for an estimated 700 km (430 mi) of range and a dual-motor, all-wheel-drive model with a combined maximum output of 460 hp (340 kW) are expected in the future. A prototype Model C with dual motors and an 80 kW-hr battery was demonstrated in October 2023.

Consumption for the standard-range single-motor version is estimated at 13.2–14.3 kWh/100 km (159–146 mpg‑e), providing a range of 489–505 km (304–314 mi) under the New European Driving Cycle, depending on specific model configuration. DC fast charging is provided through a CCS1 connector, at a maximum rate of 135 kW, which is claimed to charge the battery from 10% to 80% in 30 minutes. V2L, using the high-voltage traction battery to power up to 1,800 W of electrical loads, is possible using an adaptor.

== Foxtron Cavira ==
The Foxtron Cavira is the facelift variant of the Luxgen n7 shown in Taiwan on May 20, 2026. It is available with two variants: Emerge and Pioneer.

== Safety ==
TNCAP (1.0) test result Luxgen n7 'LR Pure+' (5-seater) (2025, similar to Euro NCAP 2017)
Test	Points	%
Overall:	5/5 stars	
Adult occupant:	34.402	90%
Child occupant:	42.667	87%
Pedestrian:	28.752	68%
Safety assist:	10.326	86%
