= Foxtron Bria =

Battery electric compact crossover SUV

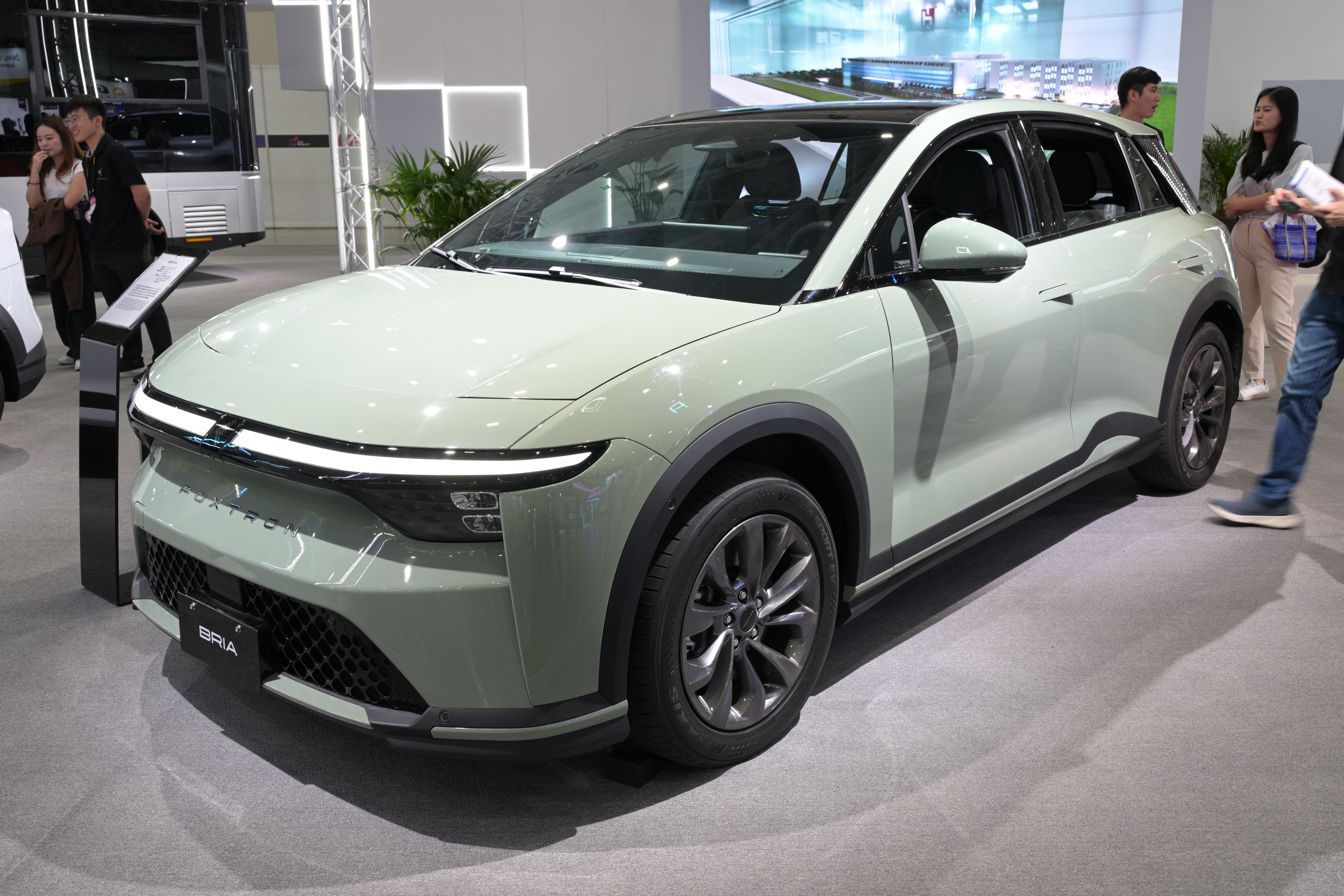
- The Foxtron Bria at Taipei 2026.

Overview
- Manufacturer: Foxtron
- Also called: Foxtron Model B (concept); Mitsubishi ASX VR-e (Australia and New Zealand)
- Production: 2025–present
- Assembly: Taiwan: Miaoli
- Designer: Foxtron; Pininfarina

Body and chassis
- Class: Compact SUV
- Body style: 5-door crossover SUV
- Layout: Rear-motor, rear-wheel drive; Dual-motor, all-wheel drive
- Platform: Foxtron MIH
- Related: Foxtron Cavira

Powertrain
- Power output: 236–401 hp (176–299 kW; 239–407 PS)
- Battery: 57.7 kWh LiFePO_{4}
- Electric range: 328–403 km (204–250 mi) (WLTP); 466–516 km (290–321 mi) (NEDC)
- Plug-in charging: DC: 134 kW CCS2; AC: 7 kW

Dimensions
- Wheelbase: 2,800 mm (110.2 in)
- Length: 4,315 mm (169.9 in)
- Width: 1,885 mm (74.2 in)
- Height: 1,535 mm (60.4 in)
- Curb weight: 1,870–2,020 kg (4,123–4,453 lb)

The Foxtron Bria is a battery electric compact SUV designed by Foxtron, a joint venture of Foxconn and Yulon Motor, using the same Foxtron MIH platform as the earlier Foxtron Model C sport utility vehicle. It was styled by Pininfarina. The prototype was unveiled in October 2022 and the production model was shown one year later.

== Overview ==
The prototype Model B was shown at Hon Hai Tech Day on October 18, 2022; contemporary press coverage focused on its design, which was subcontracted to the Italian design studio Pininfarina. Initial speculation compared the Model B to the Volkswagen ID.3, but the prototype was approximately the same size and targeted the same market segment as the Honda HR-V and Mazda CX-30.

An updated version was shown one year later; Foxtron confirmed the Model B would enter production, possibly to will be marketed by Luxgen in Taiwan as the Luxgen n^{5}. Luxgen filed for a trademark on 'n^{5}' in 2023. The vehicle was expected to start production in 2023 at an unspecified factory in China and in 2024 at Lordstown Assembly in the United States.

On December 19 2025, it was shown in Taiwan as the Foxtron Bria, It is available with three variants: Elegant, Emerge and Pioneer and sales commenced on December 25 2025.

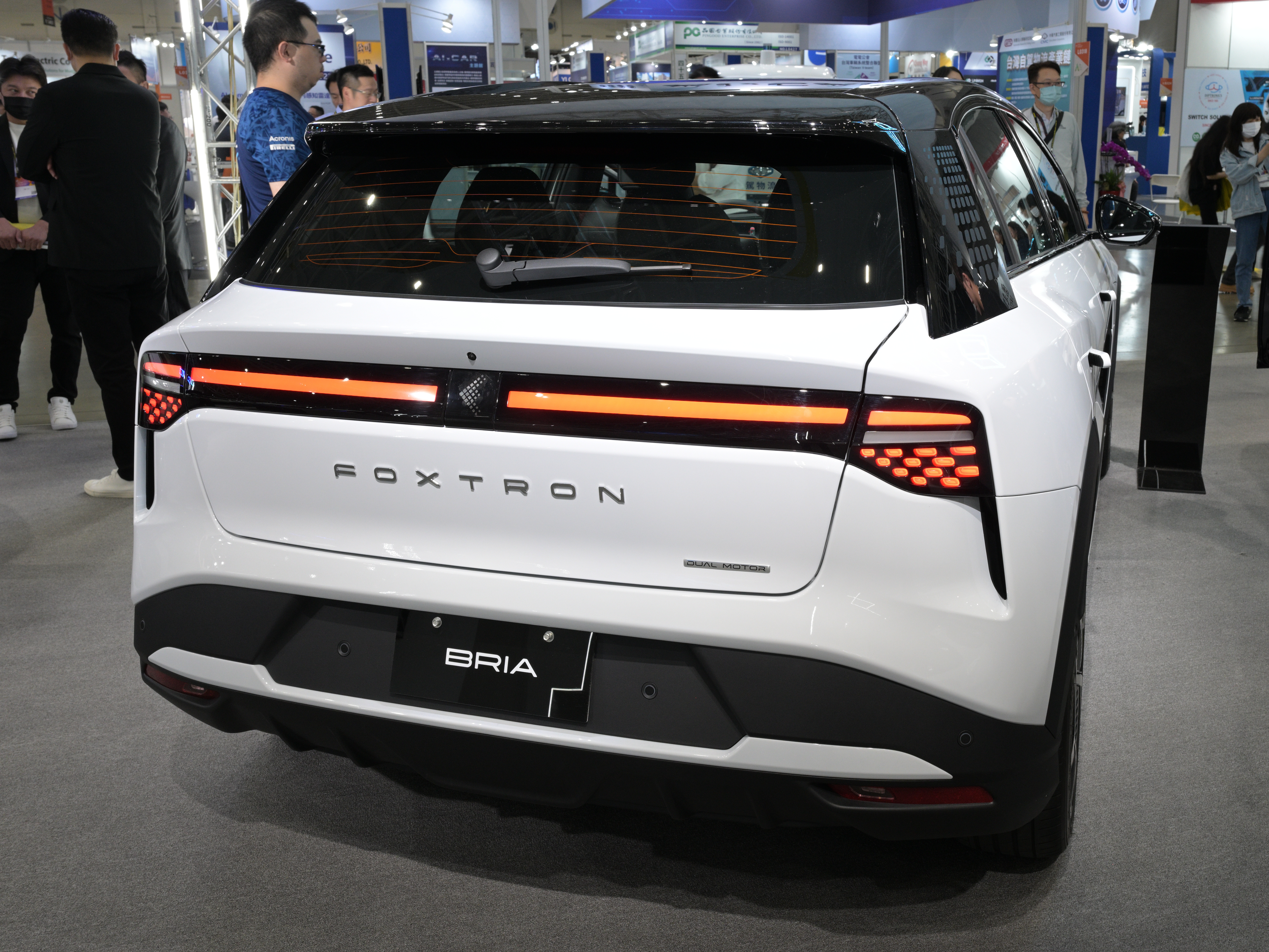
Rear view

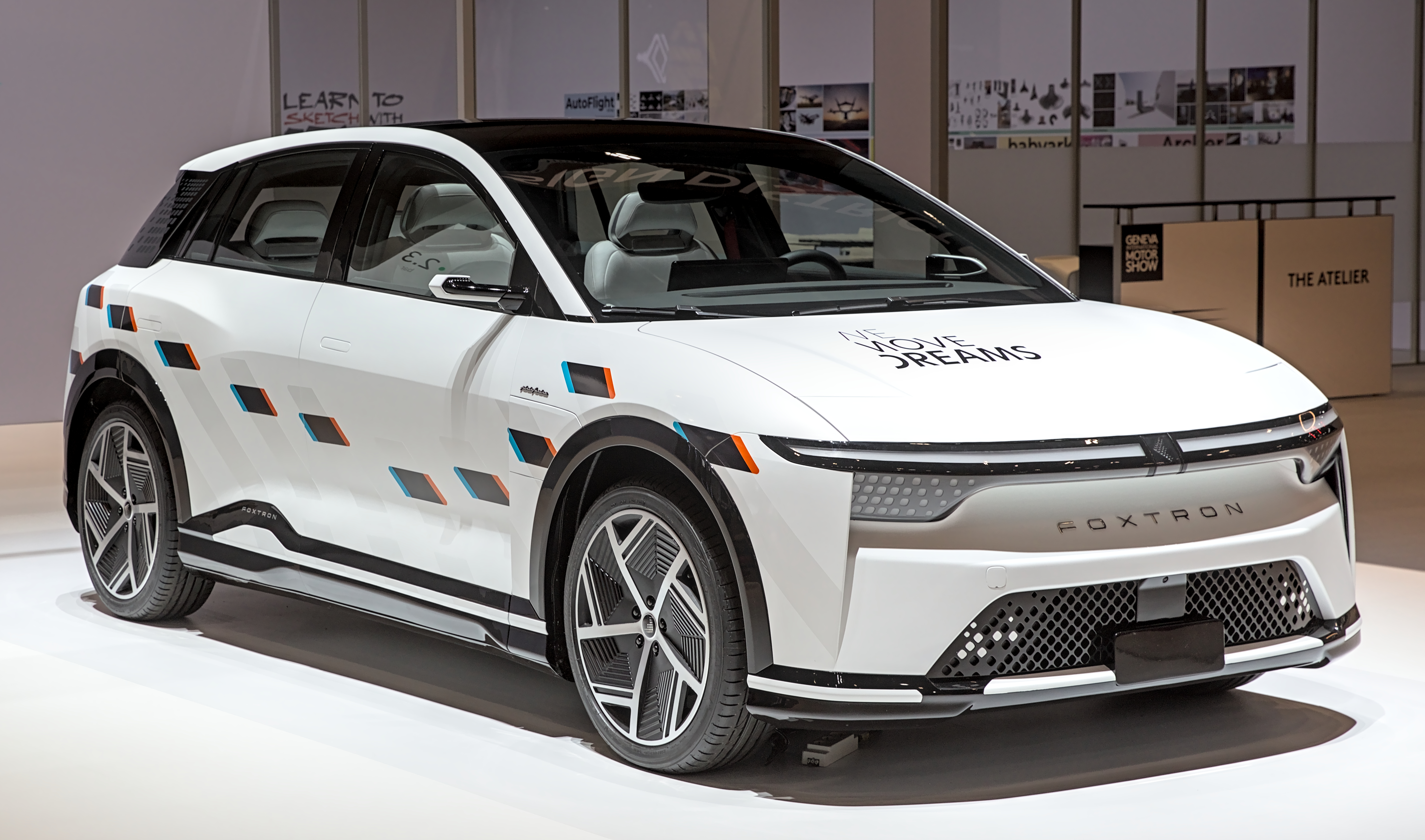
The Foxtron Model B at Geneva 2024.

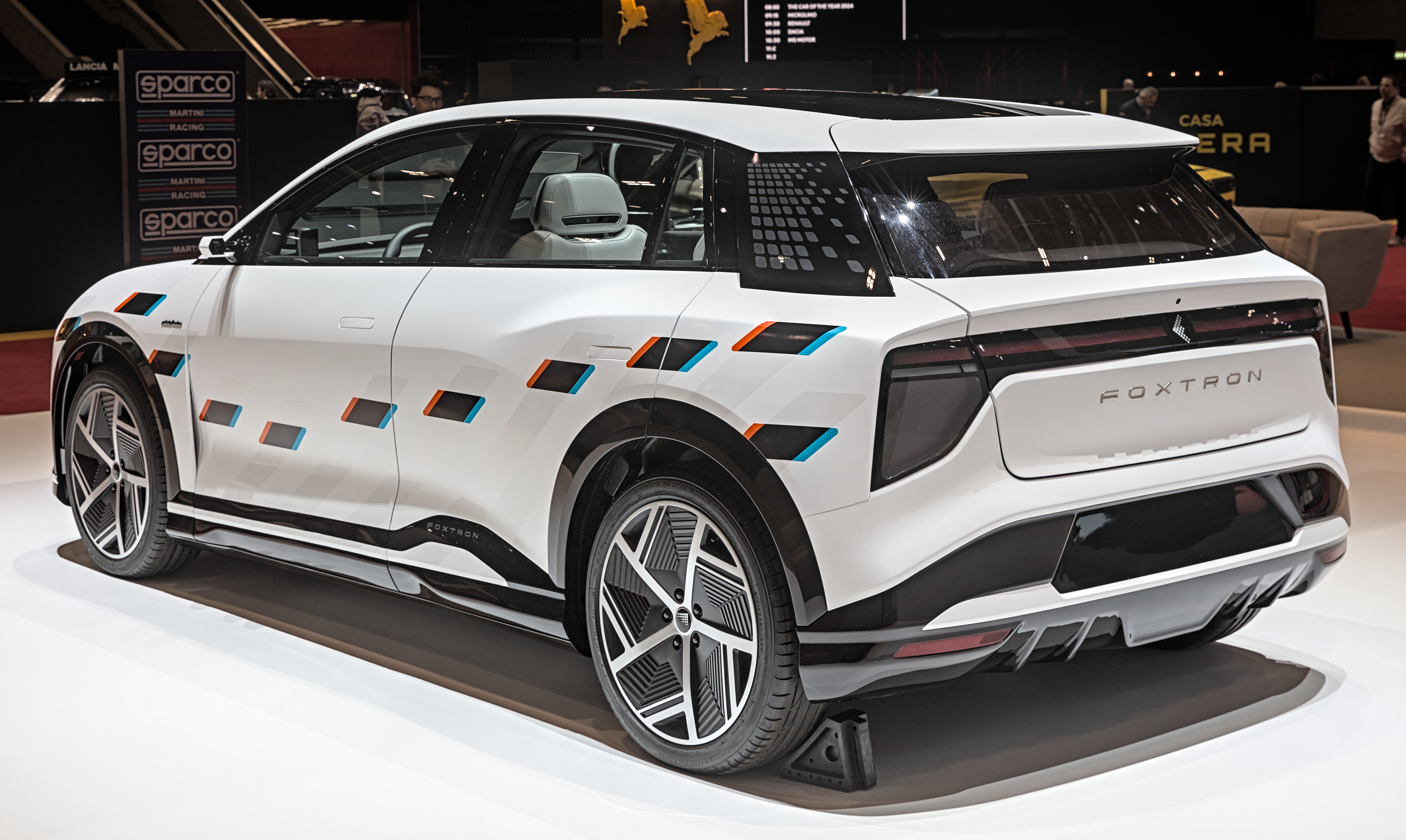
Rear view

The Bria uses a MacPherson strut front and five-link independent rear suspension geometries, and has a turning radius of 5.59 metres (18.3 ft). Standard variants use 215/55 R18 tires on 18-inch wheels, which can be upgraded to 235/40 R20 tires on 20-inch wheels, and it has a ground clearance of 155 mm (6.1 in). It has a 320-litre (11.3 cu ft) rear cargo area which expands to 1,043 litres (36.8 cu ft) with the rear seats folded down, and is supplemented by an optional 52-litre (1.8 cu ft) frunk. (Note: Volumes are measured by the water method)

The interior features a 9.2-inch digital instrument cluster and a 15.6-inch central infotainment touchscreen supplemented by a row of physical buttons below. It has a standard 7-speaker sound system, dual-zone climate control with electronically controlled front seat vents, standard power front row seats with leatherette upholstery available in black or white, and multifunction steering wheel with haptic controls. A panoramic sunroof, 12-speaker system with subwoofer, and ventilated front seats are optional.

== Powertrain ==
The range for a planned long-range version is estimated to exceed 500 km (310 mi) on the New European Driving Cycle. It is expected to be offered either as a single-motor, rear-wheel-drive vehicle or a dual-motor, all-wheel-drive version. It shares its basic platform and drivetrain components with the Luxgen n^{7}; the single-motor version is expected to have the same maximum output of 230 hp (170 kW; 230 PS) and traction battery with 60 kW-hr capacity, offering a maximum range of 450 km (280 mi), NEDC.

All versions of the Bria are equipped with a 57.7 kWh LFP battery pack which has a peak charging speed of 134 kW and can recharge from 10–80% within 30 minutes. All variants use a rear motor outputting 229 hp (171 kW; 232 PS) and 350 N⋅m (258 lb⋅ft) of torque, and rear-wheel drive variants achieve up to 516 kilometres (321 mi) of NEDC range when fitted with 18-inch wheels. All-wheel drive variants add another 171 kW motor to the front axle for a total output of 401 hp (299 kW; 407 PS) and 700 N⋅m (516 lb⋅ft) of torque, and it achieves 466 kilometres (290 mi) of NEDC range. All-wheel drive variants are capable of 0–100 km/h (62 mph) times of 3.9seconds (with rollout), and have a front-rear power distribution of 50:50 in normal mode and 30:70 in Sport mode.

Specifications
Model	Battery	Power	Torque	Range (Note: WLTP figures are taken from the mechanically identical Mitsubishi ASX VR-e in the New Zealand market)		DC charging		0–100 km/h (62 mph)	Top speed	Kerb weight
Model	Battery	Power	Torque	WLTP	NEDC	Peak	10–80%	0–100 km/h (62 mph)	Top speed	Kerb weight
RWD 18-inch wheel	57.7 kWh LFP	229 hp (171 kW; 232 PS)	350 N⋅m (258 lb⋅ft)	403 km (250 mi)	516 km (321 mi)	134 kW	30 min	6.8 s	180 km/h (112 mph)	1,870 kg (4,123 lb)
RWD 20-inch wheel	57.7 kWh LFP	229 hp (171 kW; 232 PS)	350 N⋅m (258 lb⋅ft)	380 km (236 mi)	503 km (313 mi)	134 kW	30 min	6.8 s	180 km/h (112 mph)	1,870 kg (4,123 lb)
Dual-motor AWD	57.7 kWh LFP	401 hp (299 kW; 407 PS)	700 N⋅m (516 lb⋅ft)	328 km (204 mi)	466 km (290 mi)	134 kW	30 min	3.9 s	180 km/h (112 mph)	2,020 kg (4,453 lb)

== Sales ==
Year	Taiwan
2025	18
2026	2,432
