= Mazibuko M1B =

Overview
- Manufacturer: Mazibuko Motor Company
- Designer: Nhlanhla Mazibuko

Body and chassis
- Class: Mid-size pickup truck
- Body style: 4-door pickup truck
- Platform: MMC EV

Powertrain
- Power output: 500 kilowatts (671 hp; 680 PS)
- Battery: 120 kWh
- Range: 400 km (250 mi)

Dimensions
- Length: 212 in (5,390 mm)
- Width: 72 in (1,830 mm)
- Height: 72 in (1,820 mm)

The Mazibuko M1B is a all-electric, battery-powered pickup truck to be allegedly produced by Gauteng-based startup Mazibuko Motor Company and is currently in development. If produced, it will be the company's first production vehicle.

It is the first electric pickup truck to be developed in South Africa and the African continent.

== Overview ==
The M1B is a mid-size, 4-door electric pickup truck originally unveiled in 2020. No plans have been made for when the model will reach production. The dimensions of the M1B are similar to that of the Toyota Hilux. (The M1B is slightly larger than the Hilux when it comes to length as the M1B is 2.4 inches longer than crew-cab Hilux models.)

The production location has not yet been named as the model is still in development but the M1B will not be built domestically.

=== Design ===
Filipino mobility news website Visor states that the M1B's front end design was inspired by that of the Rivian R1T.

== Powertrain ==
The M1B uses a dual-motor, all-wheel-drive layout producing 671 horsepower (500 kilowatts) and 958 pound feet (1300 Newton metres) of torque. The battery is 120 kWh but the material was never undisclosed. The 0-100 km/h time of the M1B is under 5 seconds.
