= Jun Seki =

Japanese businessman (born 1961)

Jun Seki (born May 9, 1961) is a Japanese businessman. After serving as president of Dongfeng Nissan, deputy COO of Nissan, and CEO of Nidec, he joined Hon Hai Technology Group in February 2023 as chief strategy officer (CSO) of the electric vehicle (EV) business.

== Biography ==
Seki was born in Sasebo, and graduated from Nagasaki Prefectural Sasebo Minami High School in 1980. When he was in high school, he was a sprinter of the track and field team. He served as student council president. In 1980, he entered the National Defense Academy of Japan. His motivation was that he didn't want to burden his parents with school fees and that he wanted to become a fighter jet pilot.

In 1984, he graduated from the department of science and engineering, course of mechanical engineering. His contemporaries included Masahiro Origuchi, the founder of the TechnoPro Holdings, Yoshihiro Murai, Governor of Miyagi prefecture, Goro Yuasa, chief of staff of the Japan Ground Self-Defense Force, Daisaku Sakaguchi, professor of the National Defense Academy, and Toru Kuraishi, a real estate investor. His eyesight, which was originally 2.0, suddenly declined and his path to becoming a pilot was closed, and he joined the Ground Self-Defense Force, but was soon discharged. Seeking a new challenge, he joined Nissan in 1986.

In 2001, he was seconded to Nissan North America, where he was in charge of production and other departments. In 2006, he became the head of the Nissan powertrain production technology division. In 2009, he served as the program director of the Nissan Motor program director's office.

In 2012, he was in charge of Nissan Motor executive officer MC-ASIA support, Japan/Asia business management office, domestic network strategy department, global asset management department, affiliate management department, and marine business management office.

In 2013, he became vice president of Dongfeng Nissan. In 2014, he was appointed managing executive officer of Nissan Motor China management committee and president of Dongfeng Nissan. In 2018, he was appointed senior managing executive officer of Nissan.

On October 7, 2019, it was announced that he was appointed as executive officer/deputy chief operating officer of Nissan, and a troika system was established with chief executive officer Makoto Uchida and chief operating officer Ashwani Gupta. At that time, former chairman Carlos Ghosn was arrested on suspicion of violating the financial instruments and exchange act, and the company was in big trouble. He had no hesitation in rebuilding the company as deputy COO.

On October 8, at 7:00 a.m., he received a call from an unknown number on his mobile phone. It was Nidec CEO Shigenobu Nagamori. "I thought you were going to be the president. The third one is boring. I'll make you the president, so come to my company." Nagamori eagerly persuaded Seki. To say no, he went to a dinner in Kyoto, but Nagamori's word "growth" stuck in Seki's heart. “The most important thing for a company is sustainability, and to do that, we need growth. Management is like an airplane and growth is engine of the company. I'll be able to increase the sales to 1 trillion yen, but I can't do it alone. I need your help." "I was sorry that I just became deputy COO at Nissan, but I had to say the most selfish thing of my life". Seki resigned after less than a month.

In 2020, he became a special advisor to Nidec. In the same year, he was appointed president and chief operating officer of Nidec and chairman of the board of Nidec India. In June 2021, he took over as CEO from chairman Nagamori. At the press conference announcing his appointment as CEO, he said, "I feel like I'm going after a very good singer named Shigenobu Nagamori at karaoke, but I'm also good, so please listen to my song". Knowing that he would be criticized, he was determined to fight his way through.

In April 2022, however, he was demoted to Nidec's representative director, president and chief operating officer (COO). He also served as general manager of the automotive business geadquarters, chairman of the board of Nidec Tosok, and chairman of Nidec India. Being dissatisfied with the stock price and business performance, Nagamori held an online press conference, saying, "We need to make a very quick decision and deal with it. I know everything and will take the lead again." Seki said, "Honestly, it's frustrating. I didn't have the ability to repel the headwind."

On September 2, 2022, he stepped down as Nidec President and COO. The company said it was "to take responsibility for the deterioration in business performance". Vice Chairman Hiroshi Kobe, one of the founding members, was appointed as successor on September 3. Founder and CEO Shigenobu Nagamori said at a press conference on September 2, "It was an illusion to think that there would be a good successor outside the company".

On January 30, 2023, Taiwan's Hon Hai Technology Group announced that Seki would become chief strategy officer (CSO) of the electric vehicle (EV) business on February 1, 2023. Hon Hai invited a prominent executive in the EV business for the first time, aiming to diversify its business from electronic equipment manufacturing service (EMS).
