= Mobility in Harmony Consortium =

Organization

Mobility in Harmony
- Company type: Consortium
- Industry: Automotive
- Founded: 6 July 2021; 4 years ago
- Key people: Jun Seki (CEO)
- Website: www.mih-ev.org/en/index/

The Mobility in Harmony Consortium (MIH Consortium) is an organization led by Foxconn to operate the MIH Open EV Alliance, which promotes an eponymous electric vehicle development platform featuring open standards.

== History ==
The MIH Consortium was created in 2020 by Foxconn to develop and promote a set of open standards for electric vehicles. By fostering partnerships to create reference designs, the MIH Consortium states it intends to shorten development cycles for electric vehicles, autonomous driving, and mobility service software.

In July 2022 the consortium had 2,407 members from 65 countries.

CEO Jack Cheng stated in August 2023 that MIH was seeking a factory site in India or Thailand for production of the small Project X car. After licensing Project X to M Mobility in October 2023, Cheng became the CEO of M Mobility and Jun Seki was appointed to replace him at MIH, starting in April 2024.

== Members ==
- Autocrypt
- Foxconn
- Karma Automotive
- Lordstown Motors
- Mazibuko Motor Company
- Microsoft
- Tata Technologies
- PTT Public Company Limited
- TECO Electric and Machinery
- TomTom
- Yulon

== Products ==
=== Open EV Software Platform ===
The Open EV Software Platform was developed by MIH, Arm Ltd, Microsoft, and Trend Micro.

=== Project X ===
Project X was announced in 2022 as a modular urban vehicle. At the 2023 Japan Mobility Show, MIH displayed the Project X concept, a small, three-seat battery electric vehicle for urban use. It uses two swappable battery packs designed by Gogoro for that company's electric scooters. A six-seat version is scheduled to be shown in 2024, and a nine-seat version will follow in 2025. Ultimately, the Project X vehicles are intended to serve as a reference design base for further customization by fleet operators.

The hardware and software platforms for Project X were licensed to the startup M Mobility in October 2023. MIH Consortium will assist M Mobility in developing the vehicle, but MIH Consortium retains the supply chain. The primary investor in M Mobility is Tech Mahindra; M Mobility is developing a vehicle for markets in Japan, India, and Thailand.
