= X80 =

X80 may refer to:

- Bestune X80, a Chinese compact SUV
- Lifan X80, a Chinese compact SUV
- Vivo X80, an Android smartphone range
- Zefiro Express, a type of train designated as X80 in Sweden
