= Lifan 720 =

Chinese mid-size sedan

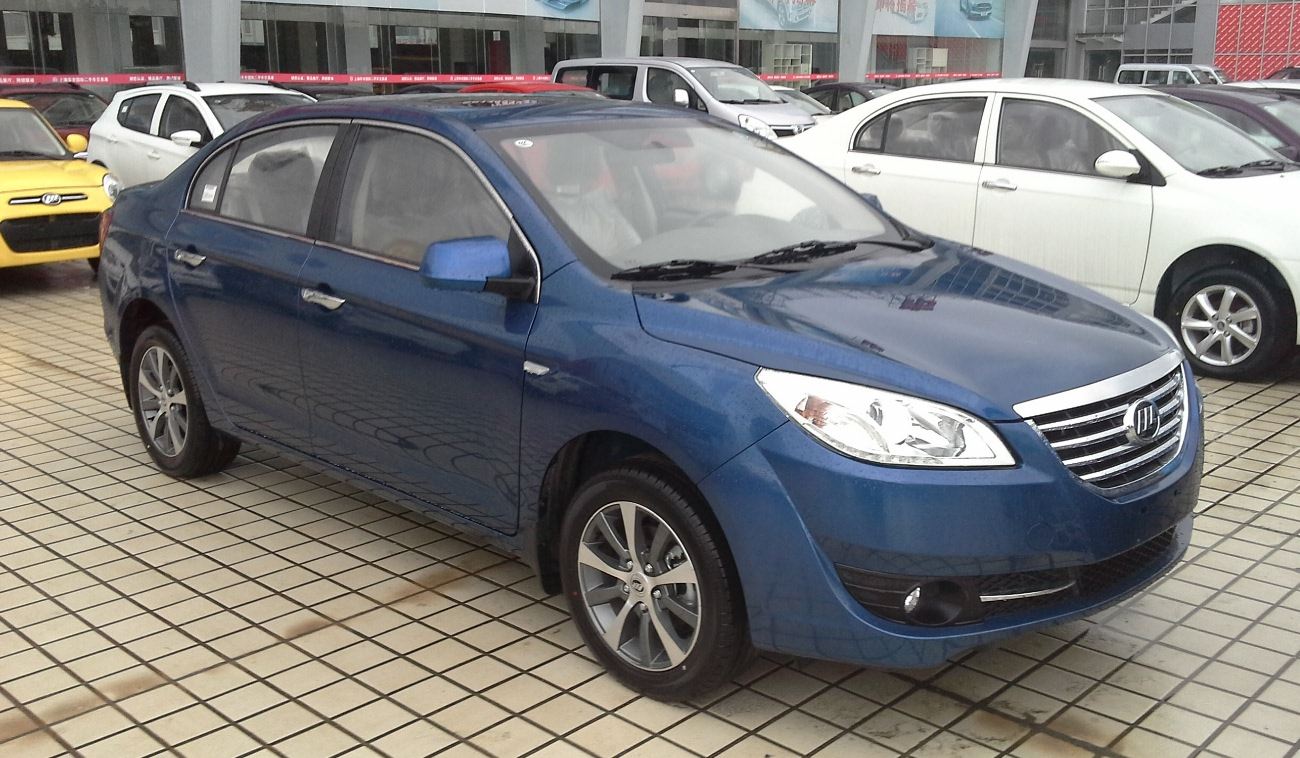

Overview
- Manufacturer: Lifan
- Also called: Lifan Cebrium (Russia)
- Production: 2012–2017
- Assembly: China: Chongqing

Body and chassis
- Class: Mid-size car
- Body style: 4-door saloon
- Layout: Front-engine, front-wheel-drive

Powertrain
- Engine: 1.8 L CVVT I4
- Transmission: 5-speed manual

Dimensions
- Wheelbase: 2,700 mm (106.3 in)
- Length: 4,700 mm (185.0 in)
- Width: 1,765 mm (69.5 in)
- Height: 1,490 mm (58.7 in)

The Lifan 720 is a four-door mid-size sedan produced by the Lifan Motors division of Lifan Group.

== Overview ==
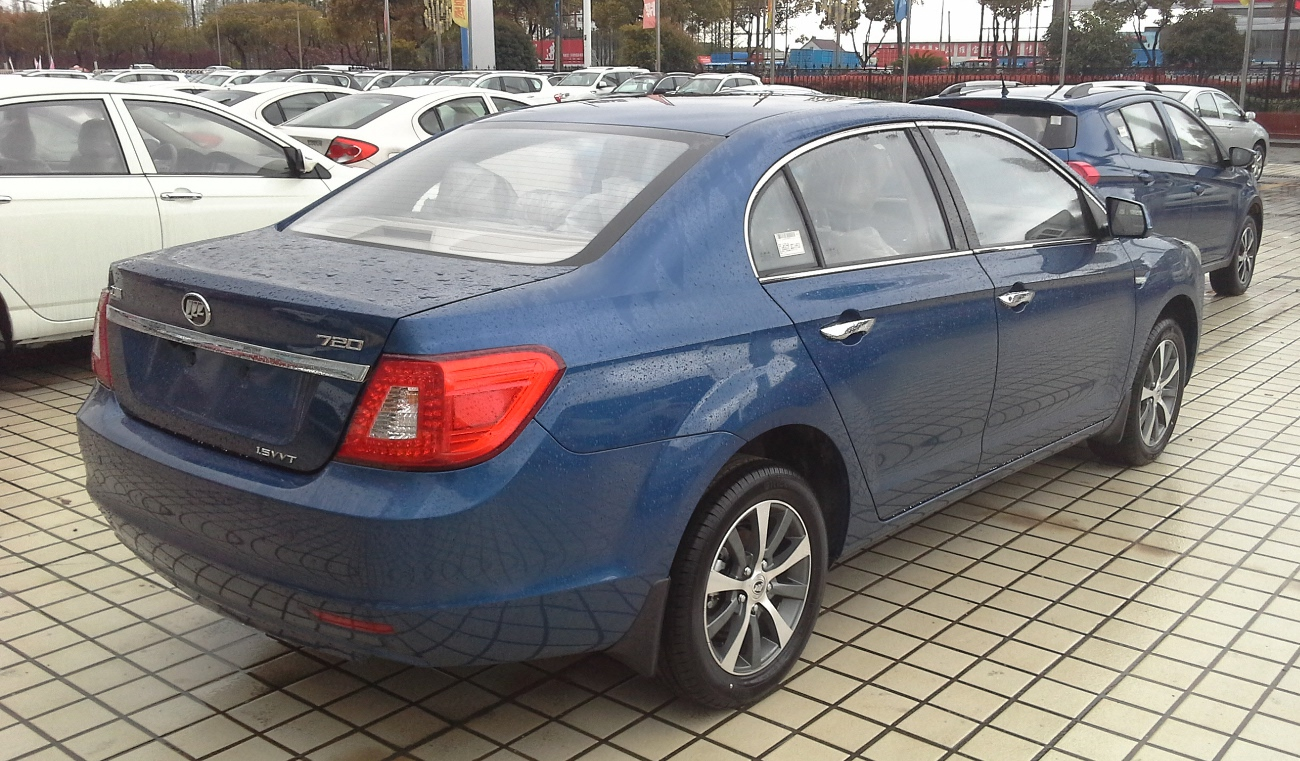
Lifan 720 rear

The Lifan 720 was launched in 2012 at the Guangzhou Auto Show with a price of 79,800 yuan.

As of August 2013, a trim called the Comfort was launched with a lower price range from 66,800 yuan to 69,800 yuan.

=== Powertrain ===
The Lifan 720 is powered by a 4-cylinder 1.8-litre engine producing 95 kW (128 hp) and a torque of 168 N⋅m (124 lb⋅ft). A version with a 4-cylinder 1.5-litre engine producing 81 kW (109 hp) and a torque of 146 N⋅m (108 lb⋅ft) was available from 2013. The engines are mated to a 5-speed manual transmission.
