= Lifan Group =

Chinese motorcycle and automobile manufacturer

Lifan Industry (Group) Co., Ltd.
- Type: Public company
- Traded as: SSE: 601777
- Industry: Automotive
- Founded: 1992; 34 years ago
- Founder: Yin Mingshan
- Headquarters: Chongqing, China
- Area served: China, South Asia, Middle East, Europe and Latin America
- Key people: Xu Zhihao (Chairman)
- Products: Commercial vehicles Passenger cars Motorcycles
- Number of employees: 13,653
- Website: lifanmotos.net

Lifan Group
- Simplified Chinese: 力帆实业（集团）股份有限公司
- Traditional Chinese: 力帆實業（集團）股份有限公司
- Literal meaning: "Great Sail" Industry (Group) Co., Ltd.
Transcriptions
Standard Mandarin
- Hanyu Pinyin: Lìfān shíyè (jítuán) gǔfèn yǒuxiàn gōngsī

Lifan Industry (Group) Co., Ltd. (Lifan Group or Lifan, Chinese: 力帆, lit. 'Power Sail') is a civilian owned Chinese motorcycle and automobile manufacturer headquartered in Chongqing, China. It was founded in 1992 and began to manufacture automobiles in 2005, with license-built microvans and a small sedan developed by Lifan.

Lifan's vehicle products include passenger cars, microvans, dirt bike engines, entry-level motorcycles, mini-vehicles, and commercial trucks. The company's non-vehicle-related activities include the manufacture of sports shoes and winemaking. Outside of China, Lifan is currently best known for the sale of small passenger cars in emerging markets.

== History ==
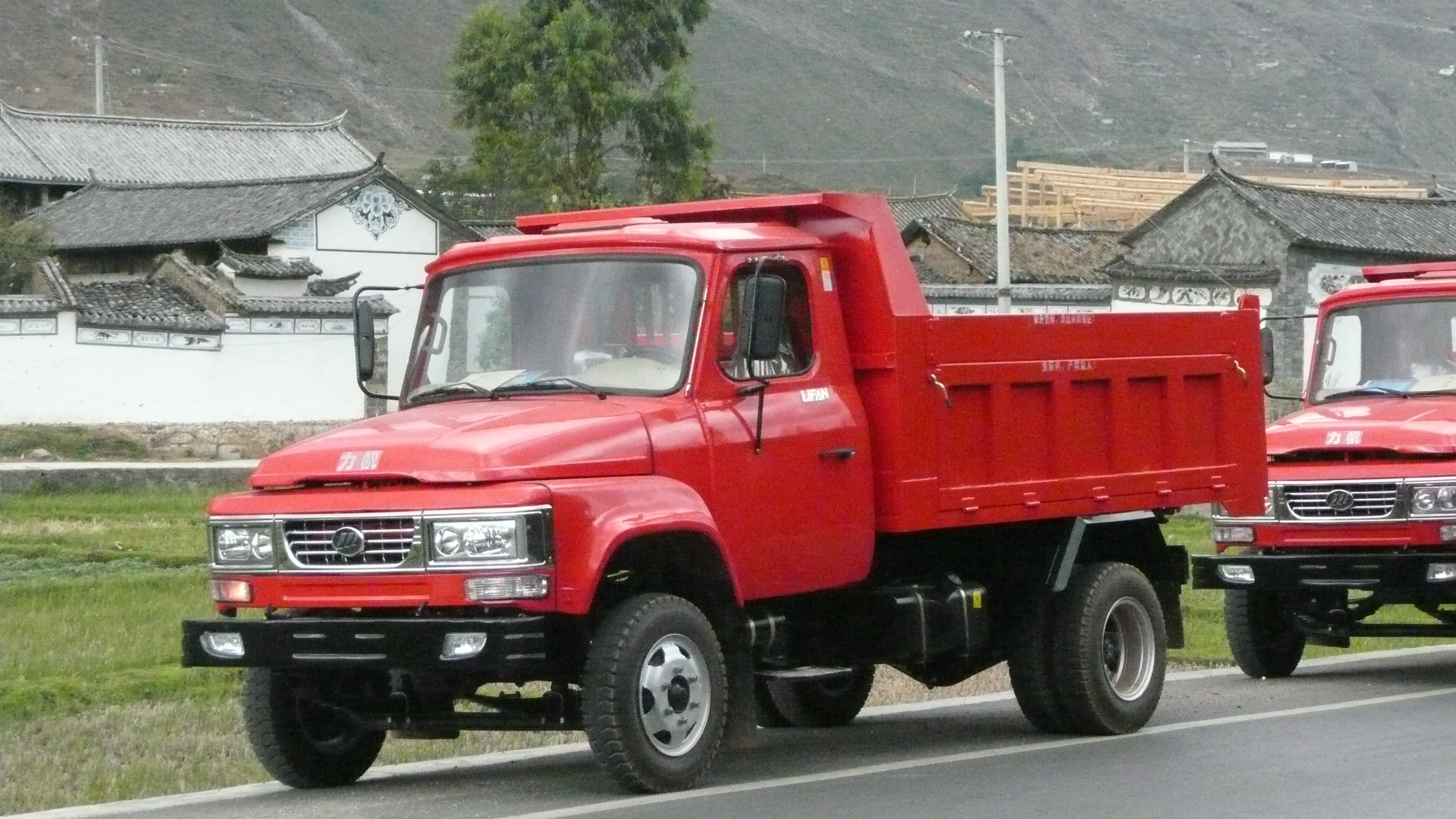
A Lifan truck, 2009

Lifan was founded by former political dissident Yin Mingshan in 1992 as a motorcycle repair shop with a staff of nine. Mingshan has a long history of conflict with government authority but currently enjoys a positive relationship with the Chinese Communist Party. The company was originally called "Chongqing Hongda Auto Fittings Research Centre". The company was renamed Lifan Industry Group in 1997. It expanded into building buses in 2003. As of 2004, Lifan was being referred to as "the largest private motorcycle manufacturer in China." In 2009, it as the fifth-largest Chinese motorcycle maker.

In 2003, Lifan acquired Chongqing Special Purpose Use Vehicle Manufacturing Co Ltd, and 2005 saw the start of automobile production beginning with the LF6361/1010 minivan and pickup based on the 1999 Daihatsu Atrai. In December 2005, Lifan's first independently developed car entered production, the 520 sedan with a Brazilian Tritec engine. As of 2011, Lifan makes a number of consumer offerings including the subcompact 320, the compact sedan and hatchback 520, the mid-sized 620 sedan, and the X60 compact SUV.

Lifan made an IPO on the Shanghai Stock Exchange in late-2010. In 2011, Lifan's exchange-listed entity announced revenue of US$1.83 billion, and profits of US$62 million.

Lifan entered into an agreement with Italian motorcycle manufacturer MV Agusta on July 4, 2014, to be MV Agusta's sole distributors in China. Lifan currently have a number of Agusta models on show at selected dealerships, including the F4 RR motorcycle.

Founder Yin Mingshan and his family are worth US$1.3 billion as of 2014.

Lifan's cash balance was 370 million yuan versus 3.1 billion yuan at the end of 2017. Lifan had only 450 million yuan out of 12.6 billion yuan worth of credit lines from 25 banks according to filings. In 2018, Lifan raised approximately 4 billion yuan selling land to the government and unit Lifan Motors to electric vehicle startup Li Auto. In 2018, Baidu and Panda Auto, an EV rental operator under Lifan Group, jointly launched the China's first shared autonomous vehicle pilot program, closed in 2020.

As of 2020, it was reported that Lifan's debt totaled 31 billion yuan ($4.4 billion) in June 2019, with 60% due within a year, while assets stood at 41.5 billion yuan according to company filings. News of Geely planning to take over Lifan surfaced with the target being the market share in the southwest which Lifan mainly dominates.

=== Trademark dispute with Honda Motor ===
In 2004, Lifan was ordered to cease selling motorcycles under the brand name "Hongda"—the culmination of a successful lawsuit brought by Honda Motors. That same year Honda initiated a separate suit against Lifan this time for using badges similar to Honda's on its motorcycle products.

=== Geely's acquisition and Lifan Technology ===
On August 6, 2020, Lifan Group issued an announcement stating that its controlling shareholder Chongqing Lifan Holdings Co., Ltd. was unable to pay off its due debts. On the grounds that the assets were insufficient to pay off all debts, the company applied to the Chongqing No. 5 Intermediate People's Court for bankruptcy reorganization. Lifan Group issued an announcement stating that Lifan shares were suspended for one trading day on August 24, 2020, and trading resumed on August 25. The stock was subject to a delisting risk warning, and the abbreviation was changed to: *ST Lifan. In October 2020, Lifan Group founder Yin Mingshan, his wife Chen Qiaofeng, and children Yin Xidi and Yin Suowei were investigated by the China Securities Regulatory Commission for suspected violations.

In January 2021, Lifan Group was renamed Lifan Technology, and Manjianghong Fund and Geely Maijie were introduced as investors. Xu Zhihao, director of Geely Holding Group and CEO of Geely Technology Group, was appointed as chairman. In May, the auto business was restarted. On December 13, Geely Auto and Lifan jointly invested in establishing a joint venture.

In March 2025, the Lifan Technology was renamed to Chongqing Qianli Technology.

=== List of Chairman ===
- Yin Mingshan (1992–2017)
- Chen Wei (2017)
- Mou Gang (2017–2021)
- Xu Zhihao (2021–present)

== Products ==
When Geely acquired Lifan in 2020, Lifan is now more focused on original vehicles development for taxi customers and battery swap support.

=== Motorcycles ===
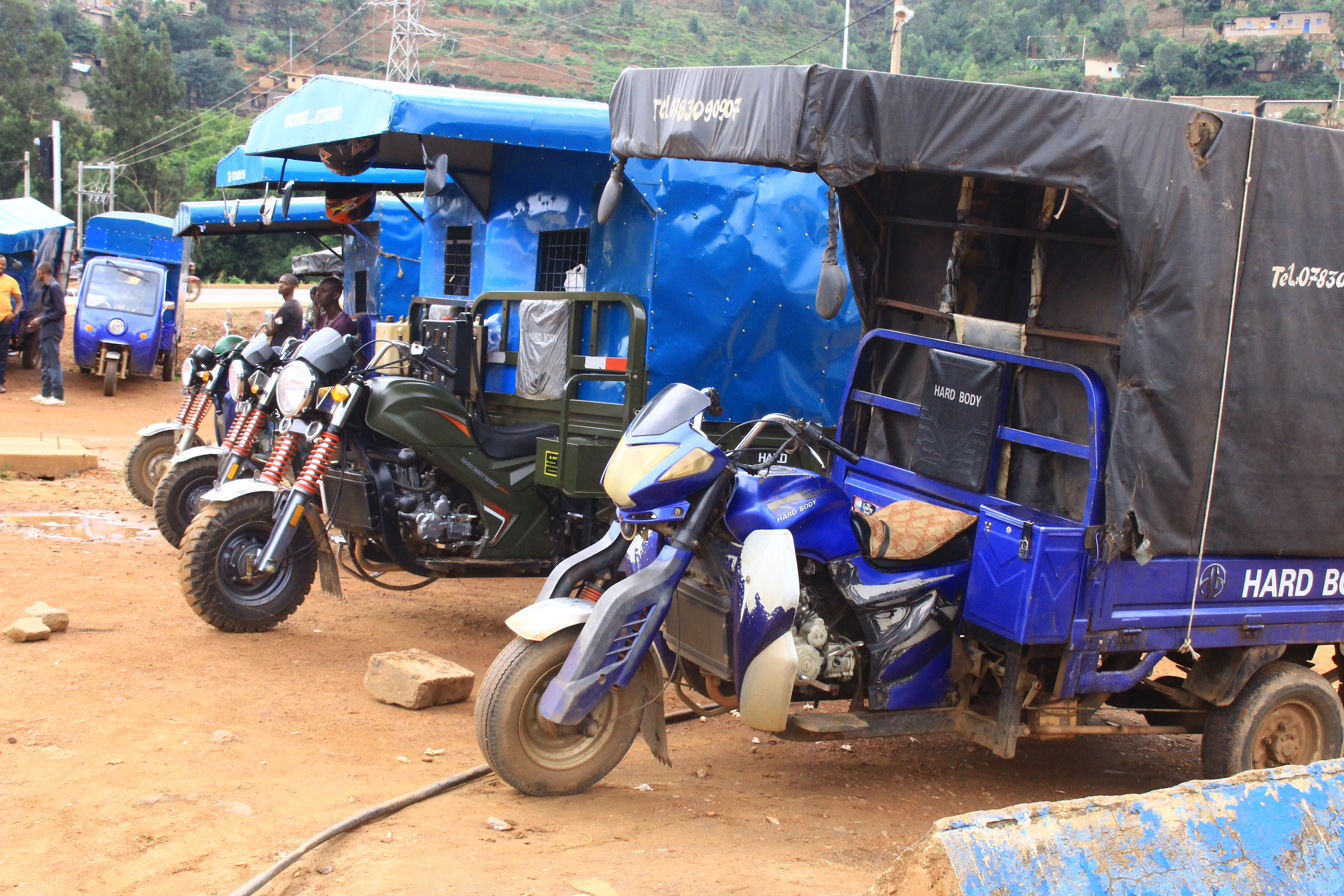
Lifan tuk-tuks in Rwanda (2020)

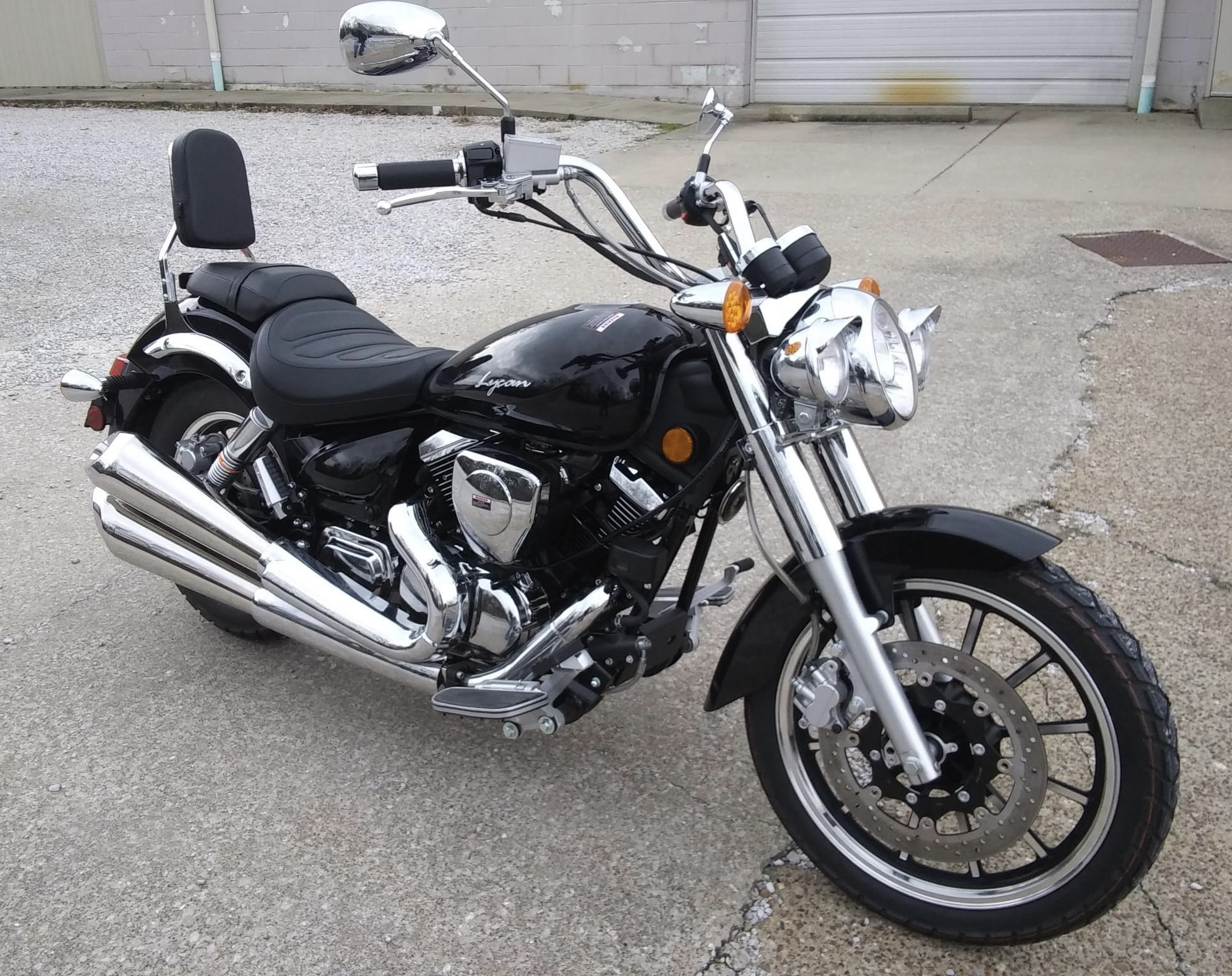
Lifan V16 250, also called Lycan

Current and former Lifan motorcycle products include:

- Lifan LF150-10S (KPR150) - Small-displacement street motorcycle.
- Lifan LF250GY-2 Cossack - Dual-sport motorcycle
- Lifan LF400 (399cc) - Similar to a Harley or Yamaha Virago XV535.
- Lifan LF150-10B (KP150) - Smaller, less powerful version of the KPR150 street motorcycle.
- Lifan KPR 200 - The most powerful model in the KPR range
- Lifan LF100-C (II) - (PONY 100II) - Mini street bike.
- Lifan LF150-5U (KPmini 150) - Mini street motorcycle.
- Lifan X-Pect (200cc) - entry-level dual-purpose motorcycle.
- Lifan KPX 250 - intermediate dual-sport motorcycle.
- Lifan V16 (LF250-E) - 250 cc (15 cu in) V-twin cruiser
- Lifan V16 Plus (LF250-K) - 250 cc (15 cu in) V-twin cruiser
- Lifan V16S (LF250-R) - Sport version of V16
- Lifan Blues (LF150T-8G) - midiscooter

==== PFMoto ====
PFMoto (Paifang Moto) is the new motorcycle brand of Lifan created in 2022; PFMoto sold lower-cost motorcycle and scooter, the first model introduced in the Chinese market in 2023 was the Starship 3, a cruiser-style with a design inspired by the Honda Gold Wing, and a 302cc V-twin engine. In 2023, the Starship 6 is introduced, a version equipped with a 573 cc V2 engine.

Subsequently, the Starthunder 250, a compact cruiser, and the Gravity 150 (LF150T-8C) scooter, equipped with a 149.3 cc single-cylinder engine, were launched.

In 2024, the Starship 4 was introduced as an intermediate model between the Starship 3 and the Starship 6. This motorcycle is equipped with a 398 cc V2 engine.

=== Automobiles ===
Current and former Lifan automobile products include:

- Lifan LF6361 and Lifan LF1010 (2005–2010) - this small minivan and pickup is based on the 1999 Daihatsu Atrai
- Lifan 320 (Smily, 2008–2016) - a small hatchback, famous for being a fairly straightforward copy of the current Mini.
- Lifan 330 (Smily, 2013–2018)
- Lifan 520 (Breez, 2006–2012) - This subcompact sedan was Lifan's first original development. The car is based in the chassis of the 1991 Citroën ZX.
  - Lifan 520i - the hatchback version of the subcompact 520, with its own bodywork
- Lifan 530 (Celliya, 2013–2018)
- Lifan 620 (Solano, 2008–2015) - a compact sedan
- Lifan 630 (Solano, 2014–2016)
- Lifan 650 (Solano, 2016–2020)
- Lifan 720 (Cebrium, 2012–2017)
- Lifan 820 (Murman, 2015–2020)
- Lifan Lotto (L7/Letu, 2014–2018)
- Lifan Xuanlang (M7, 2017–2020)
- Lifan X50 (2014–2020)
- Lifan X60 (2011–2018) - Lifan's first SUV
- Lifan Maiwei (X7, 2016–2020)
- Lifan X70 (Pengfei, 2018–2020)
- Lifan X80 (2017–2020)
- Lifan Foison (Fengshun, 2011–2021) - this minivan range is based on the earlier LF6361 series.
  - Lifan Mini Truck LF1022 (T11) - a truck version of the Foison
- Lifan Xingshun (Seasion, 2011–2022)
  - Lifan Light Truck model LF1025 (T21, DC Truck) - a truck version of the Xingshun

==== Gallery ====
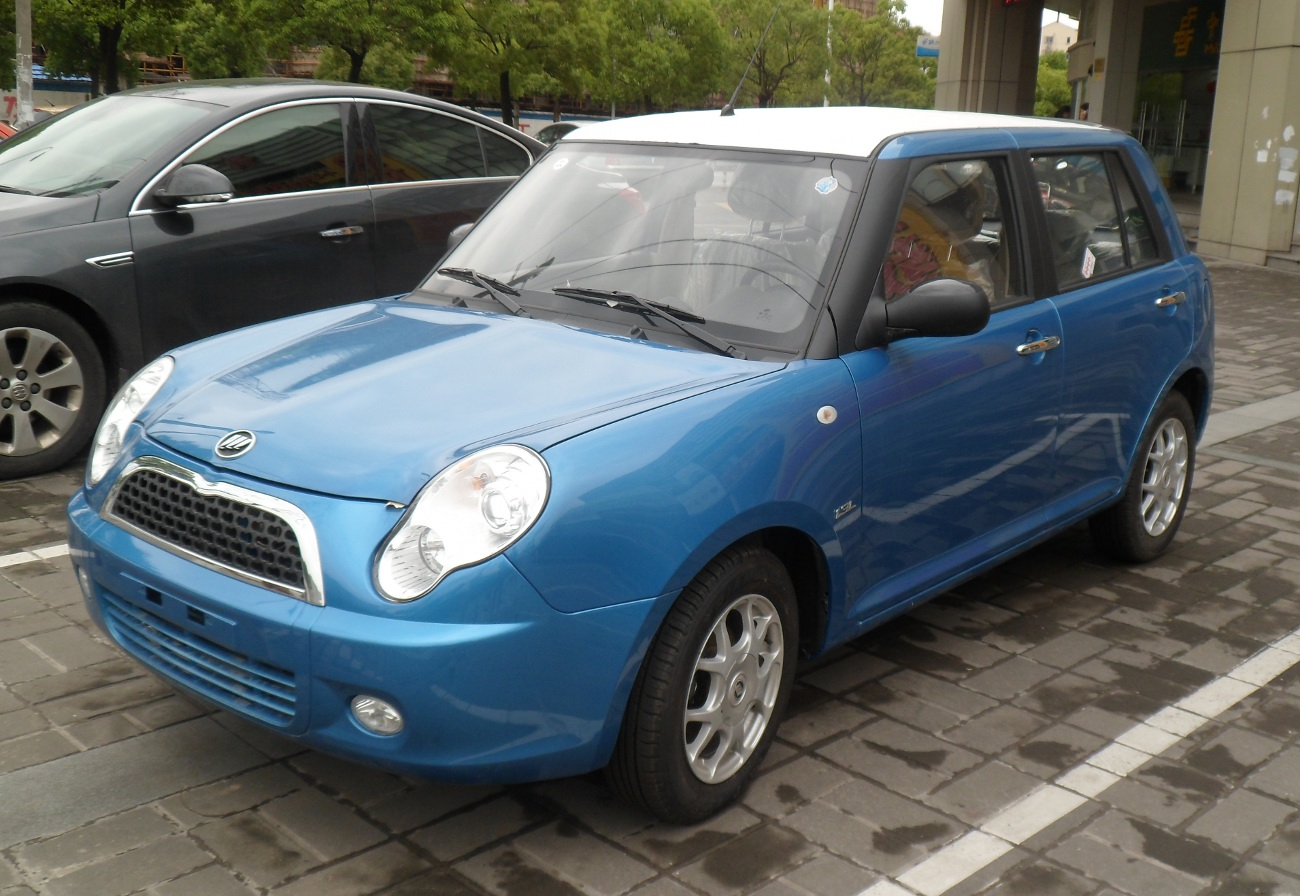
Lifan 320

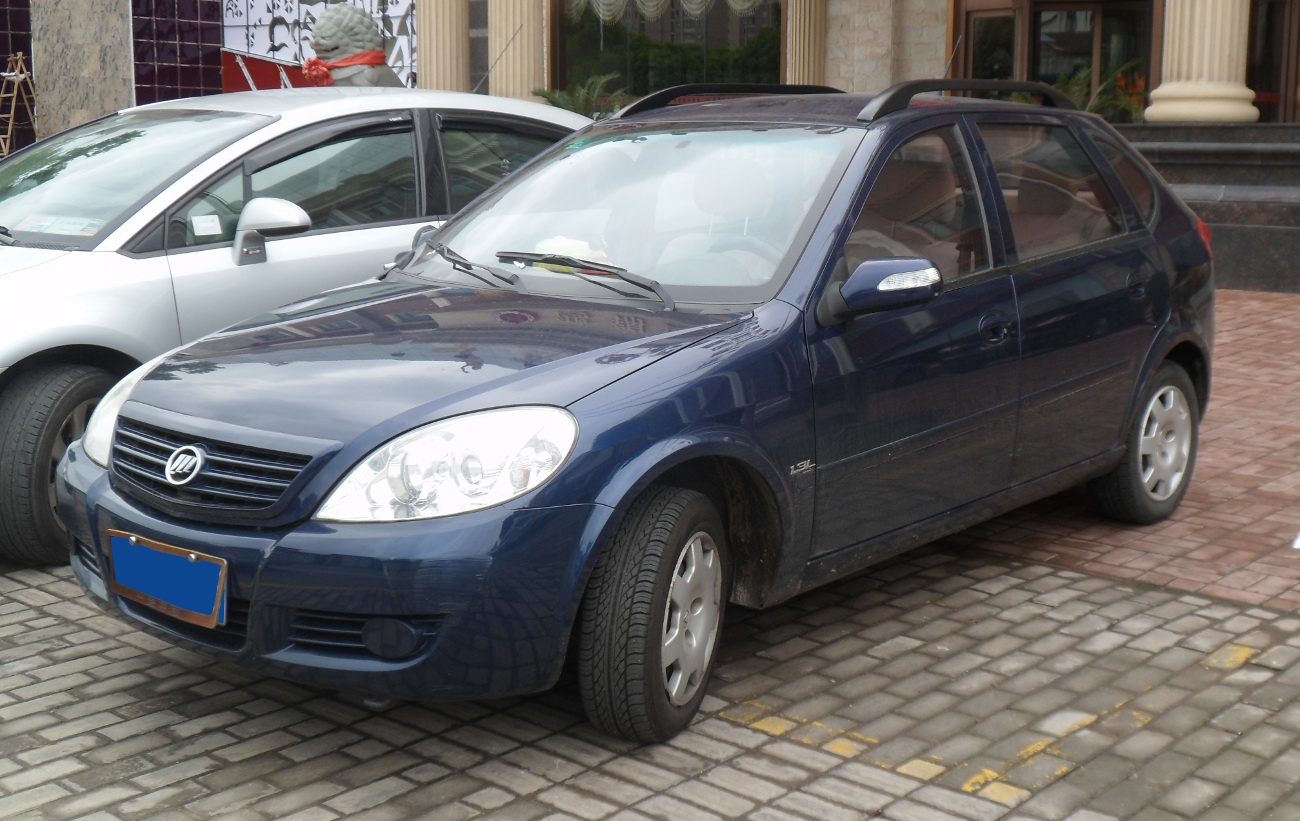
Lifan 520i

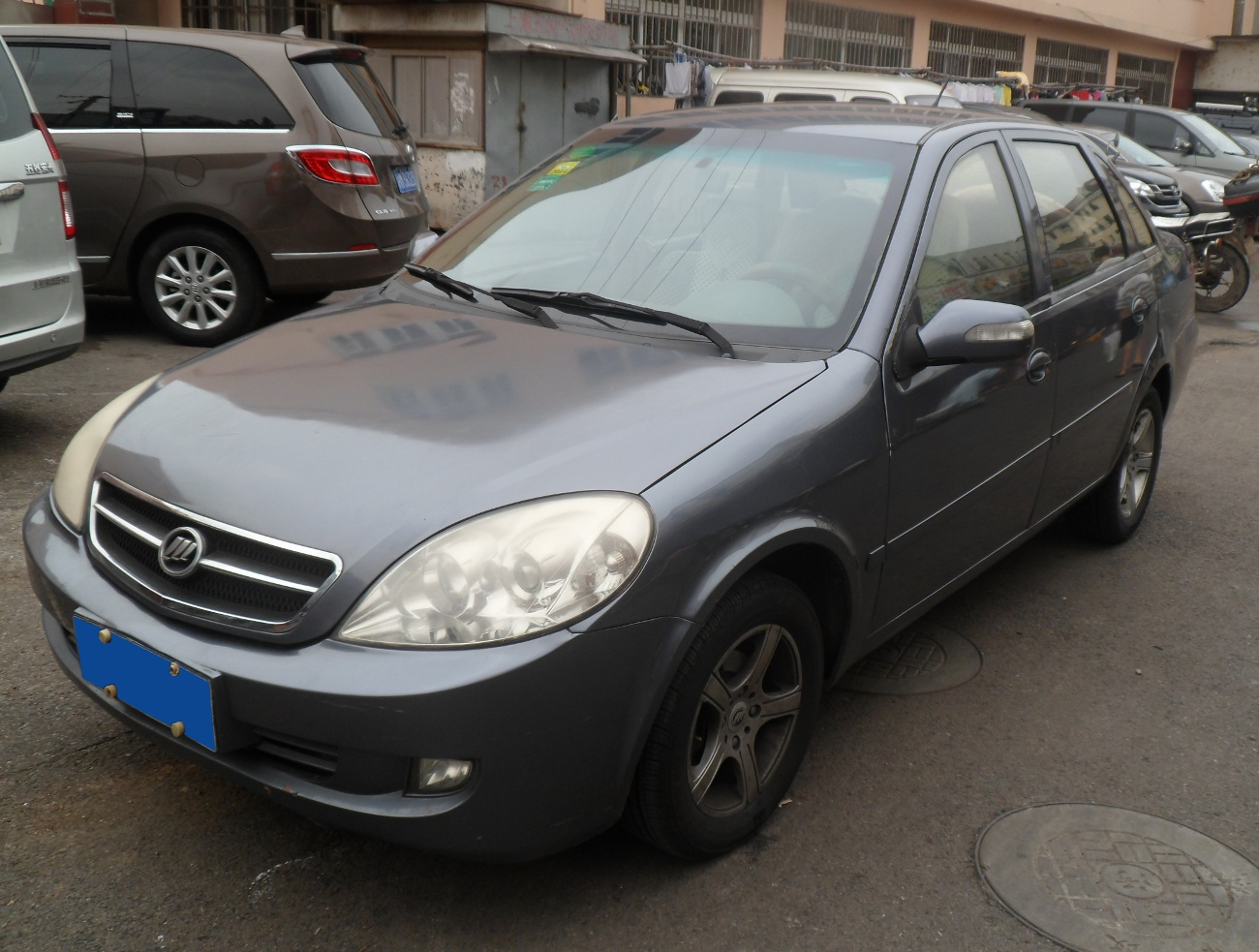
Lifan 520

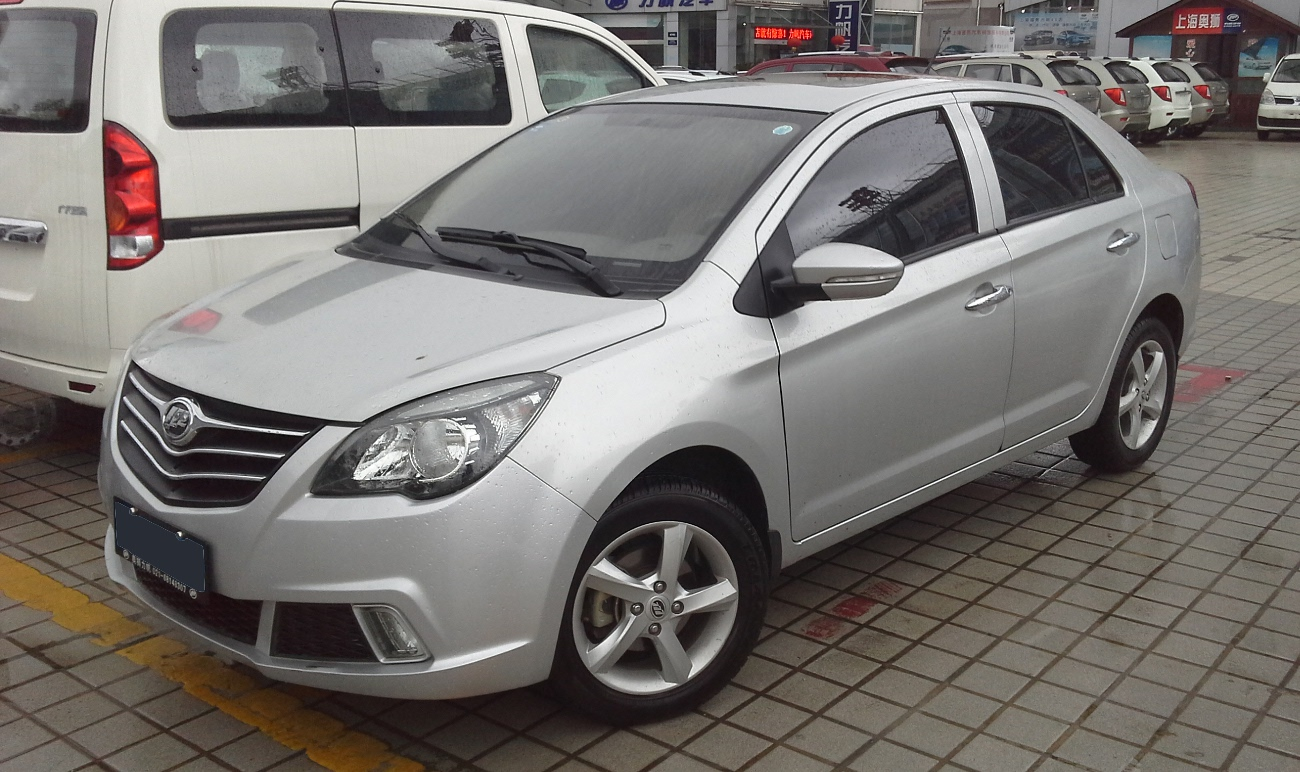
Lifan 530

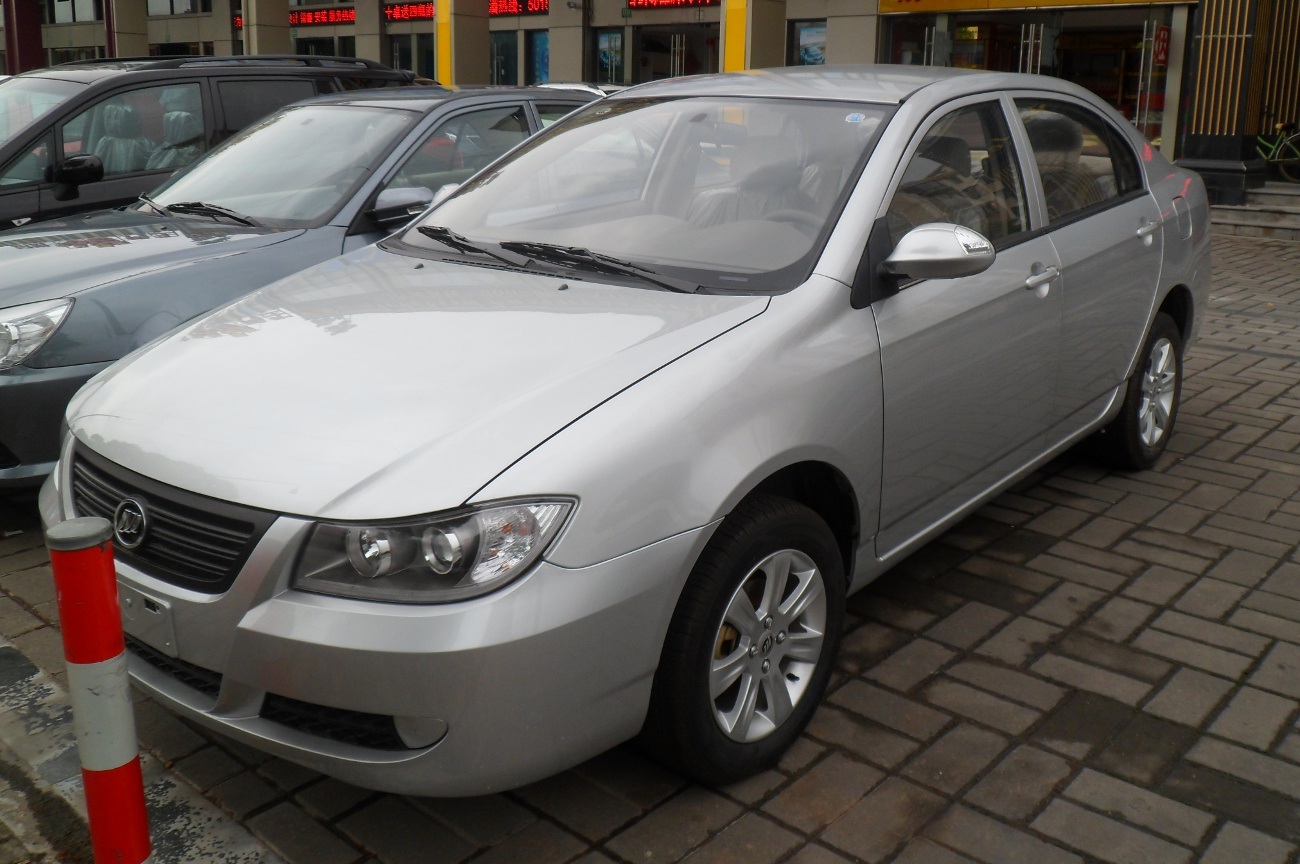
Lifan 620

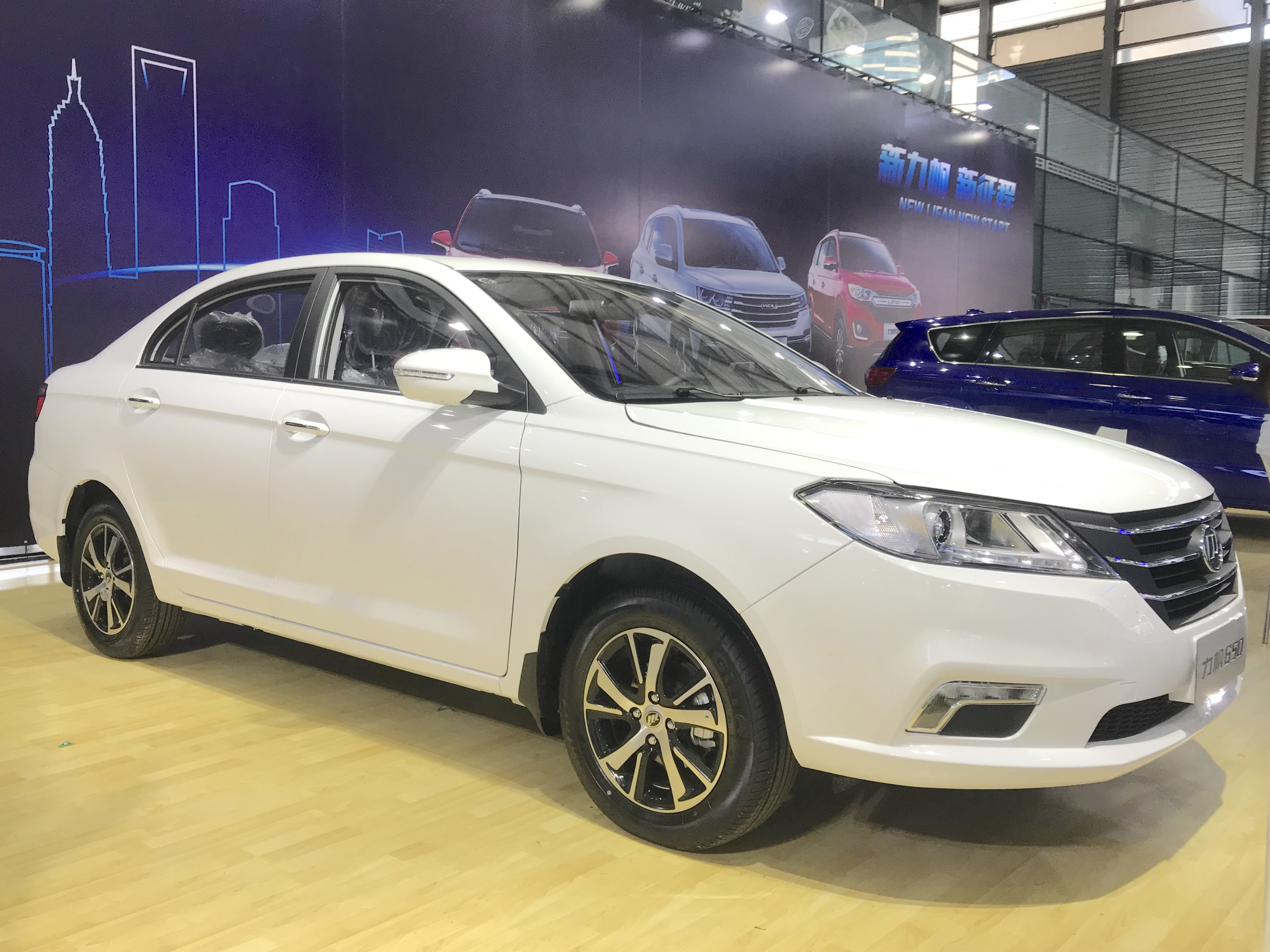
Lifan 650

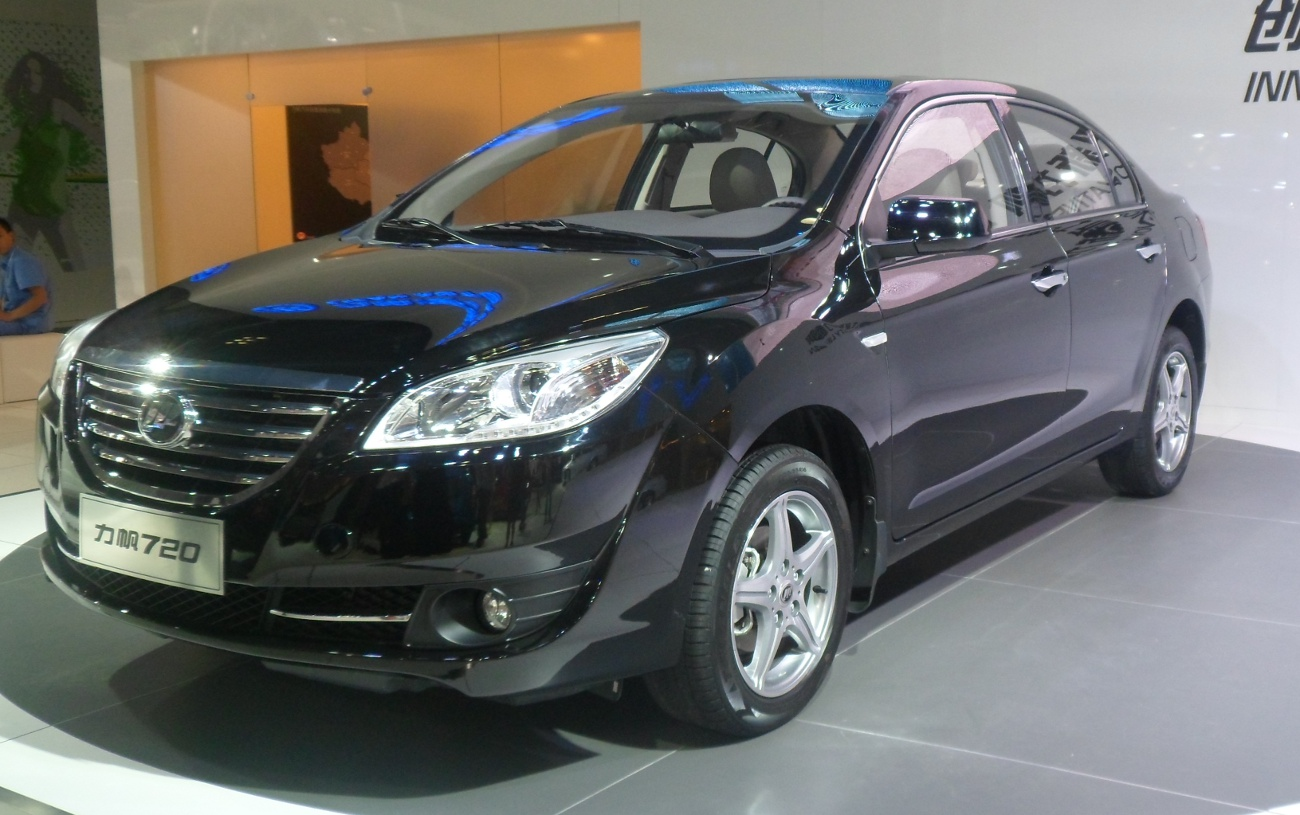
Lifan 720

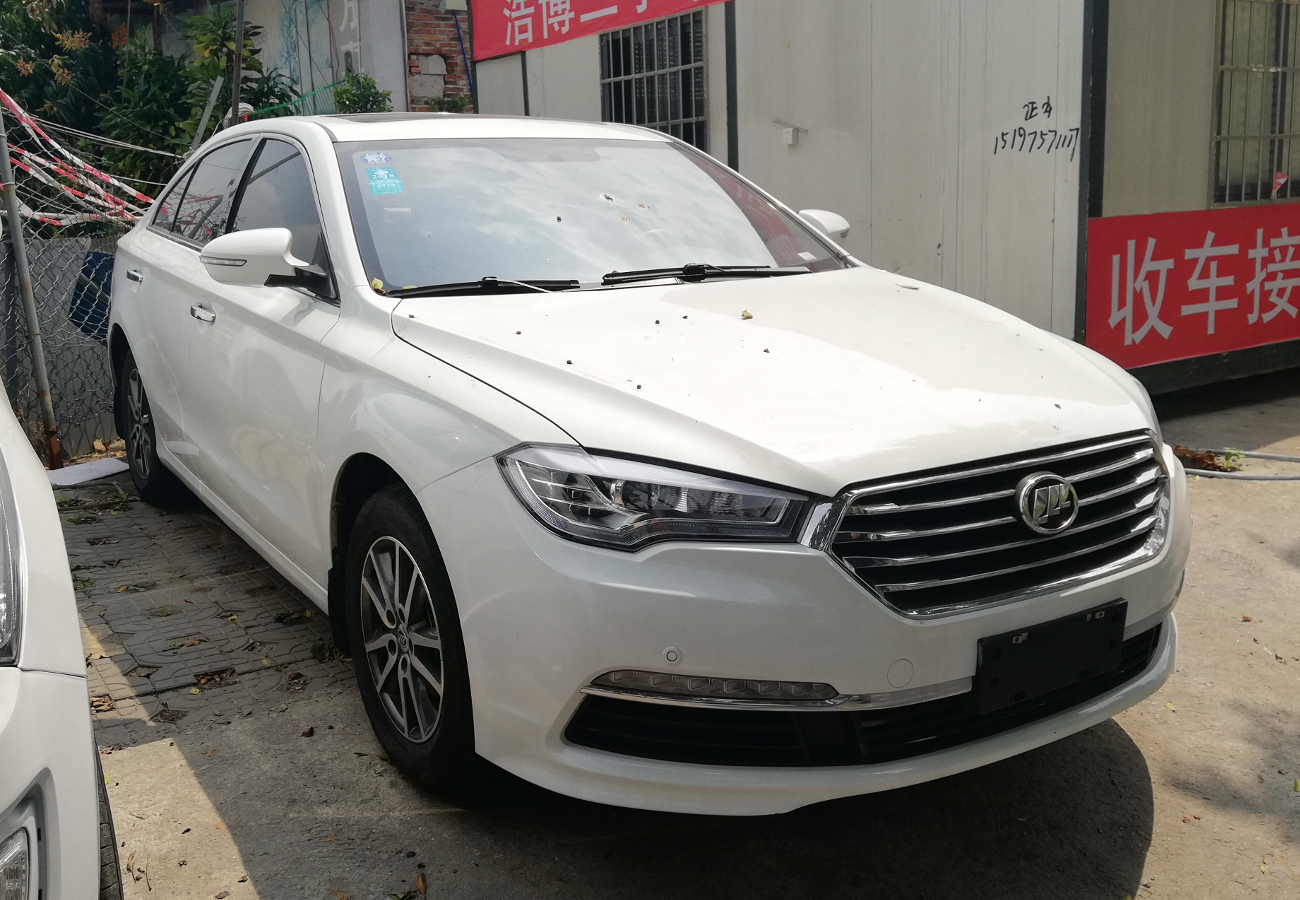
Lifan 820

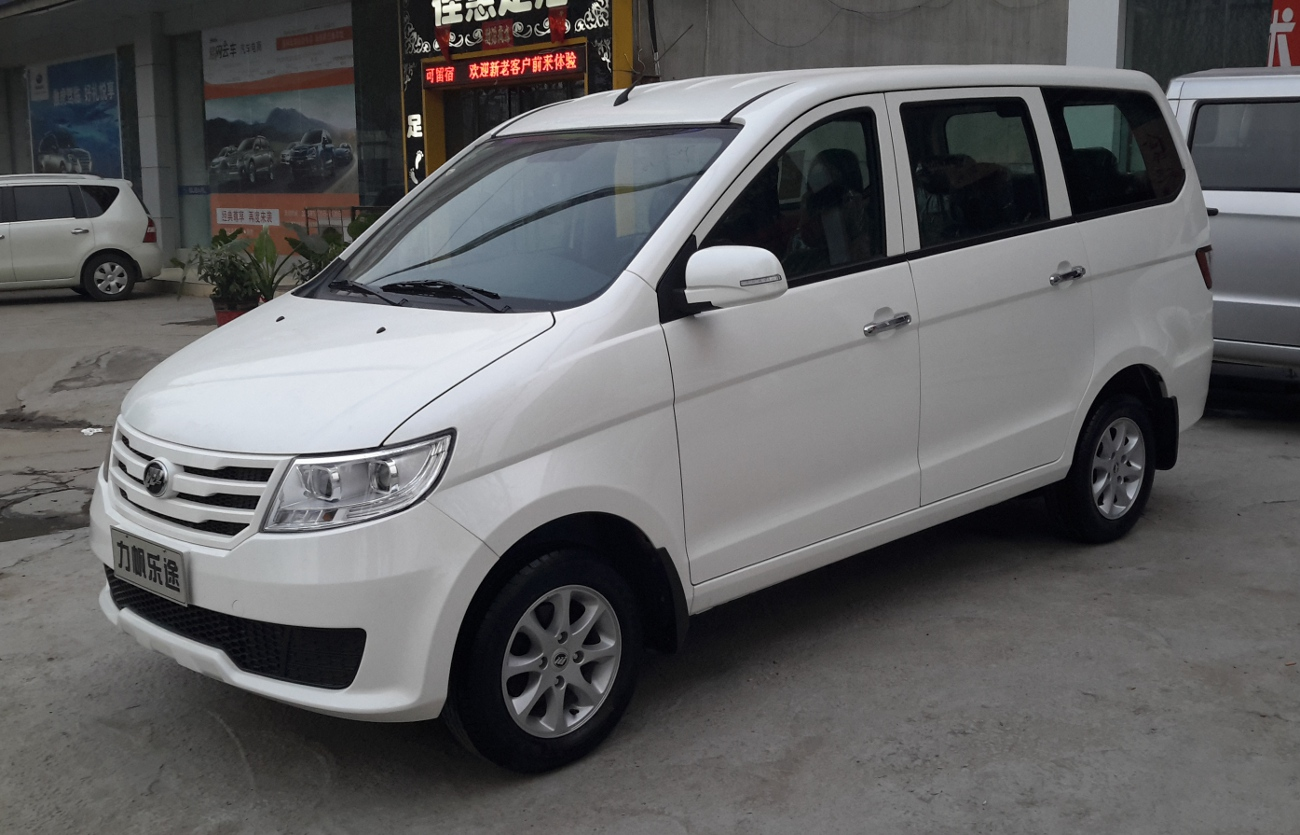
Lifan Lotto

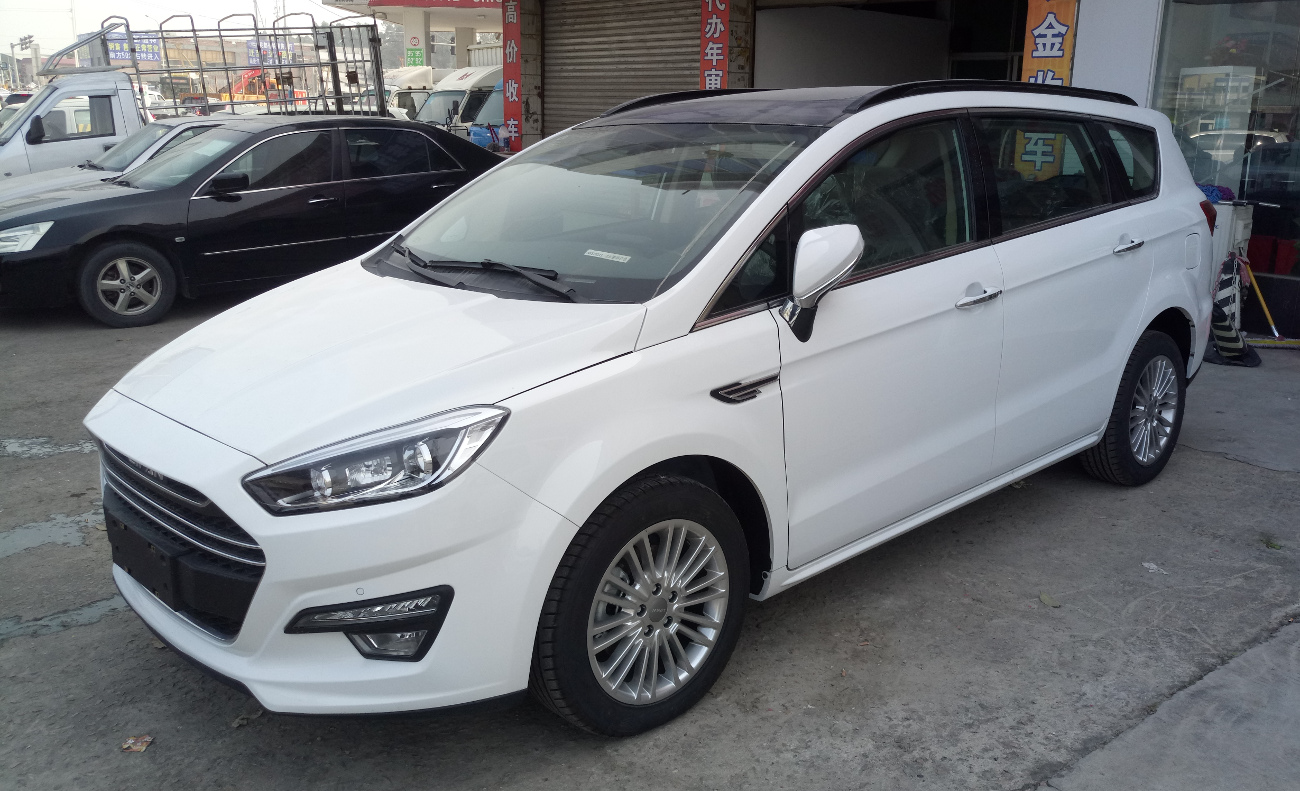
Lifan Xuanlang (M7)

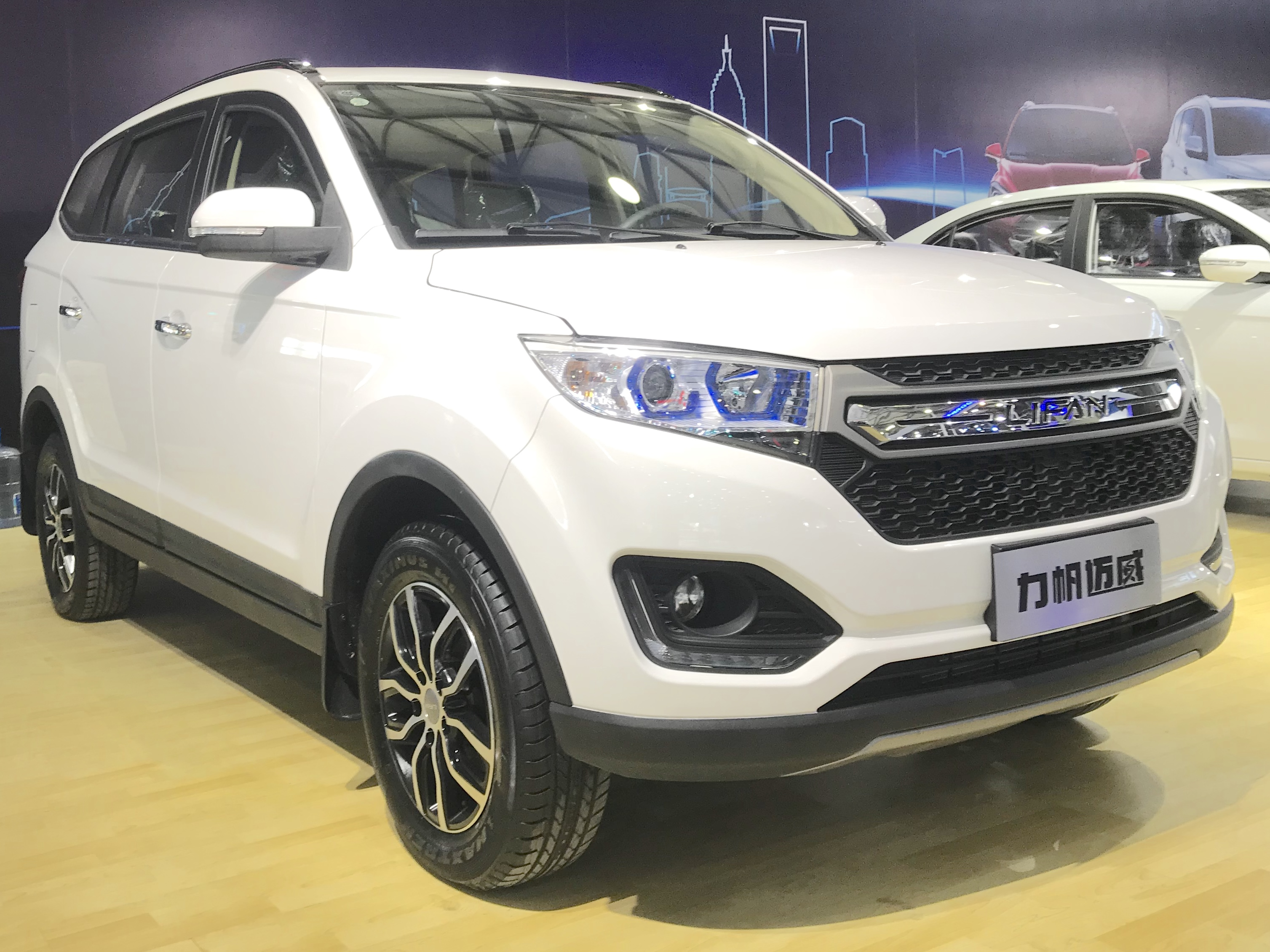
Lifan Maiwei

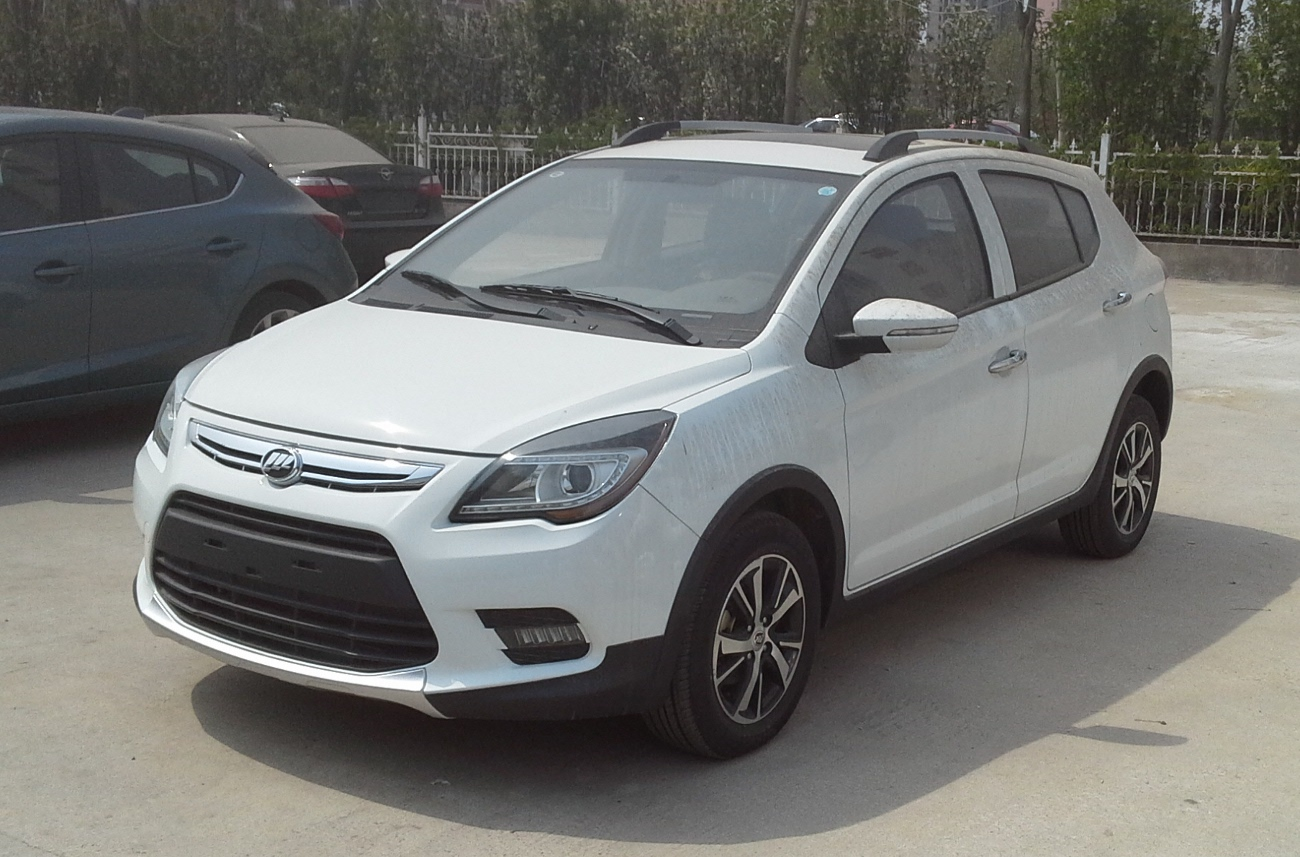
Lifan X50

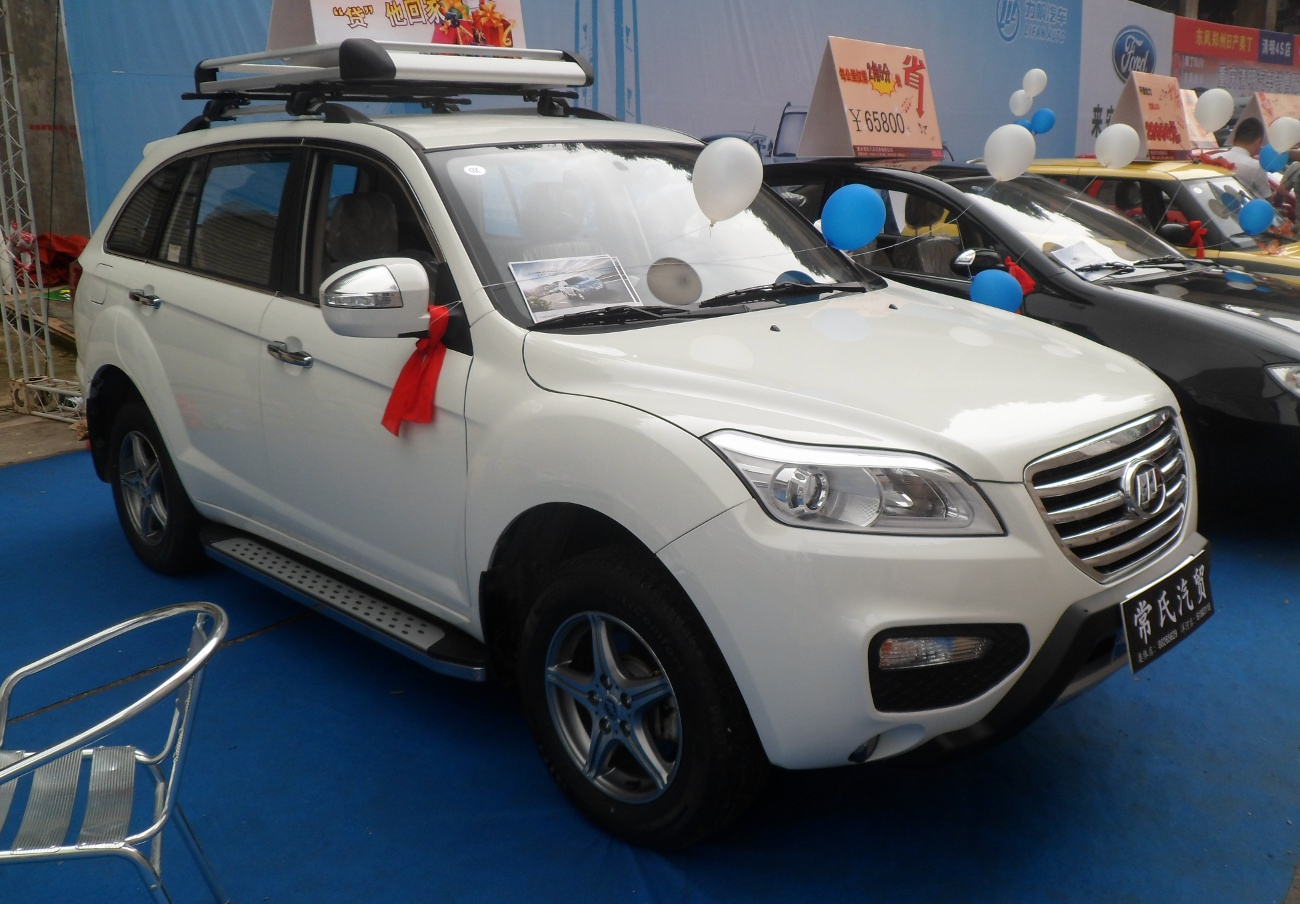
Lifan X60

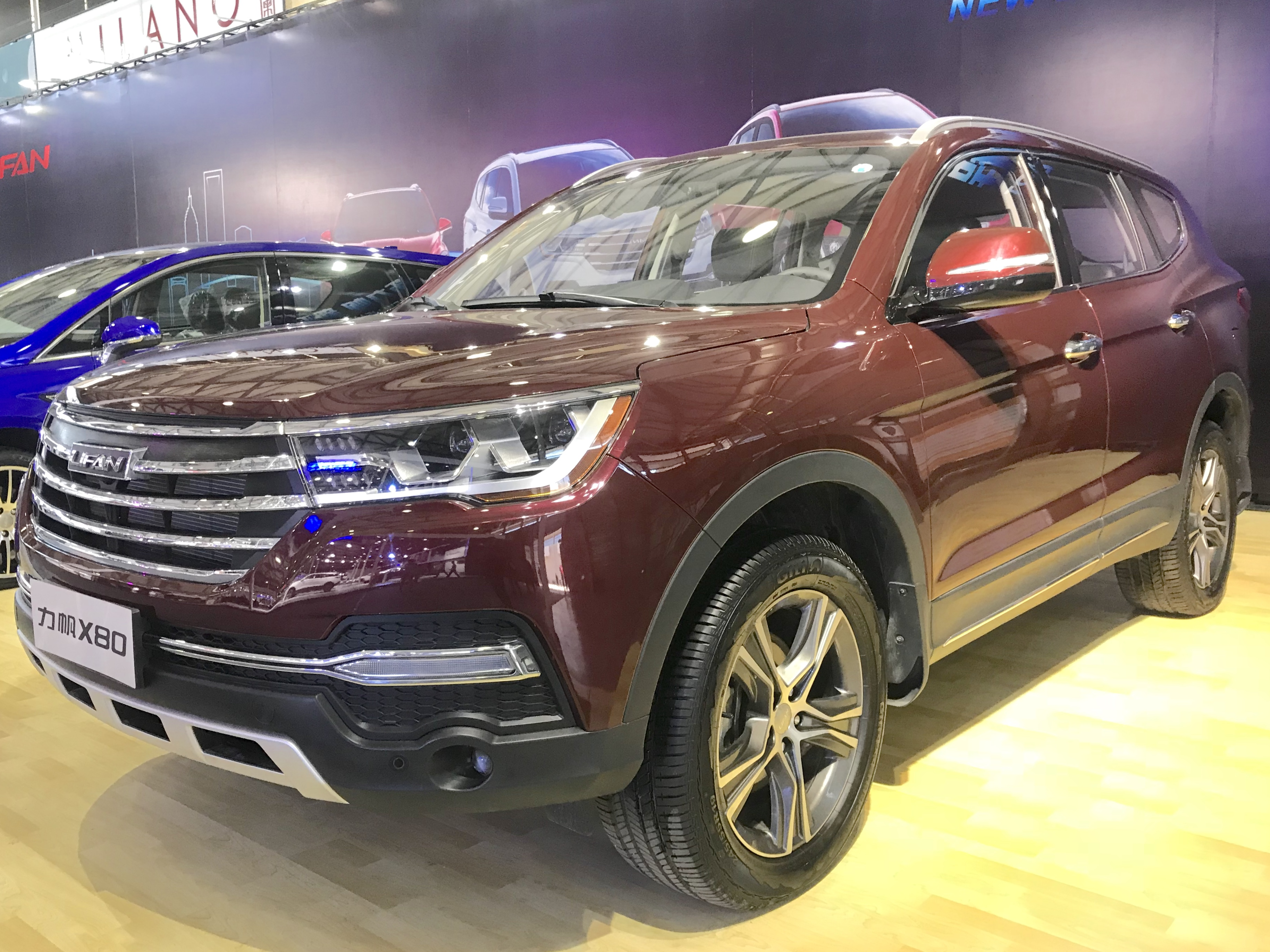
Lifan X80

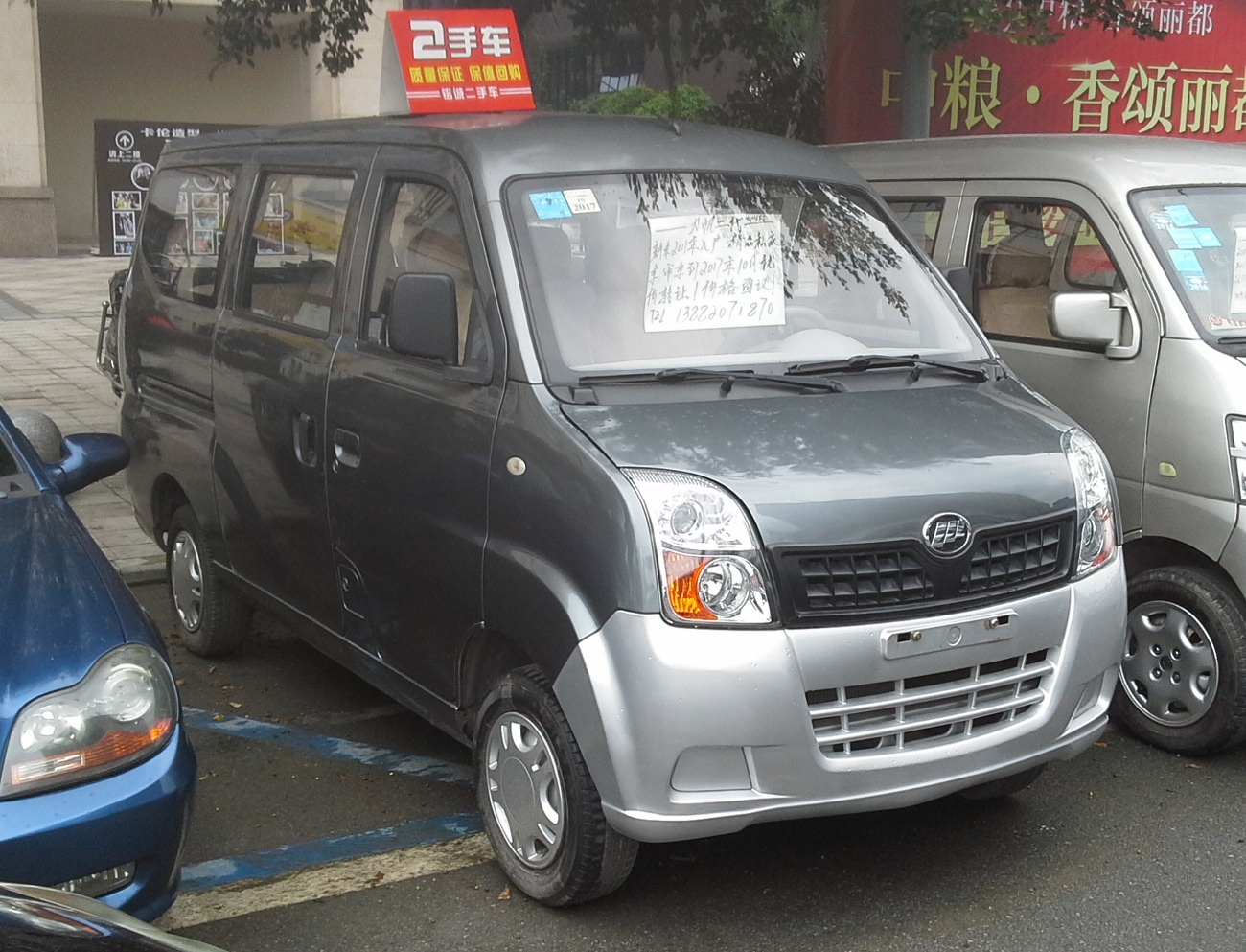
Lifan Fengshun

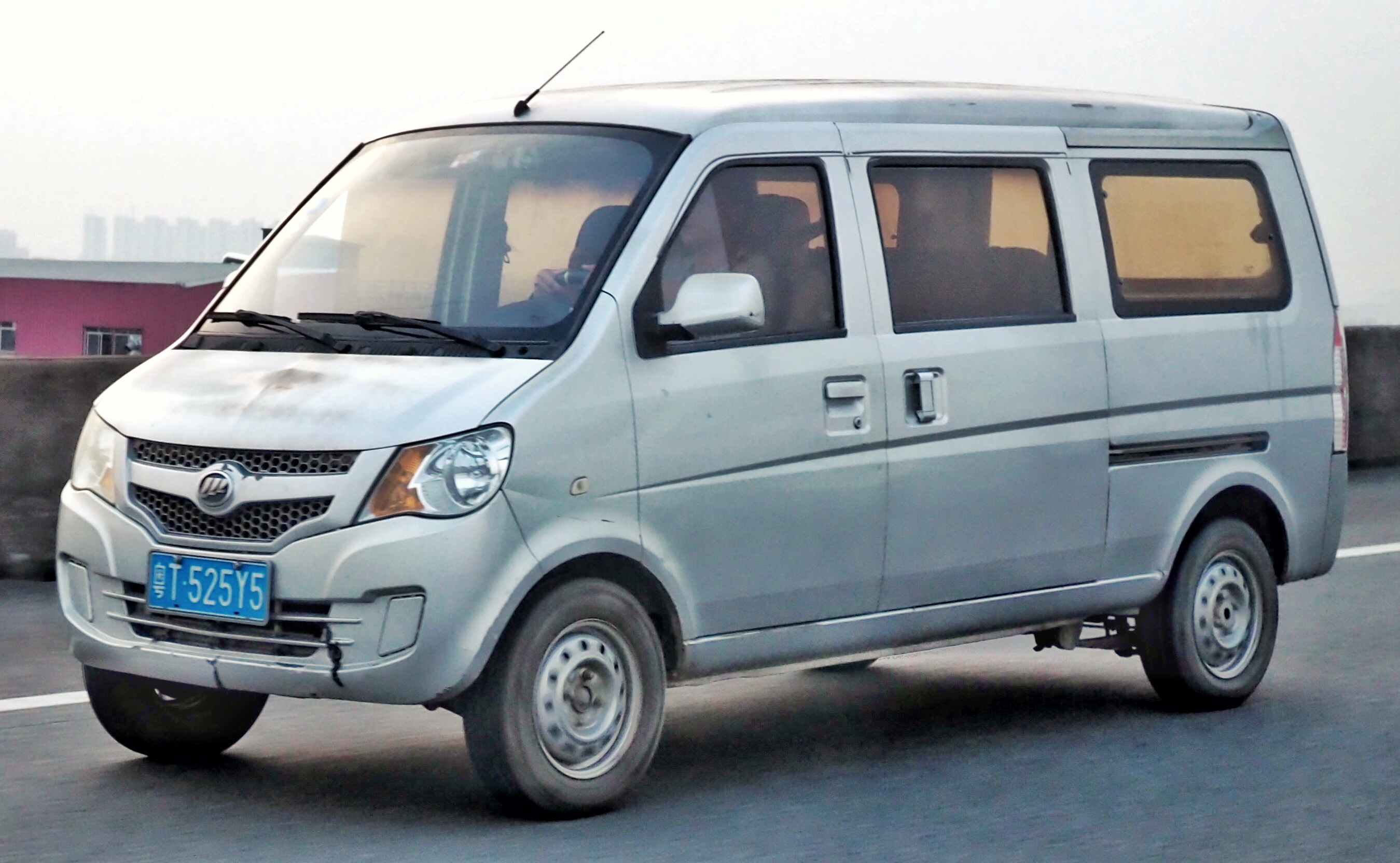
Lifan Xingshun

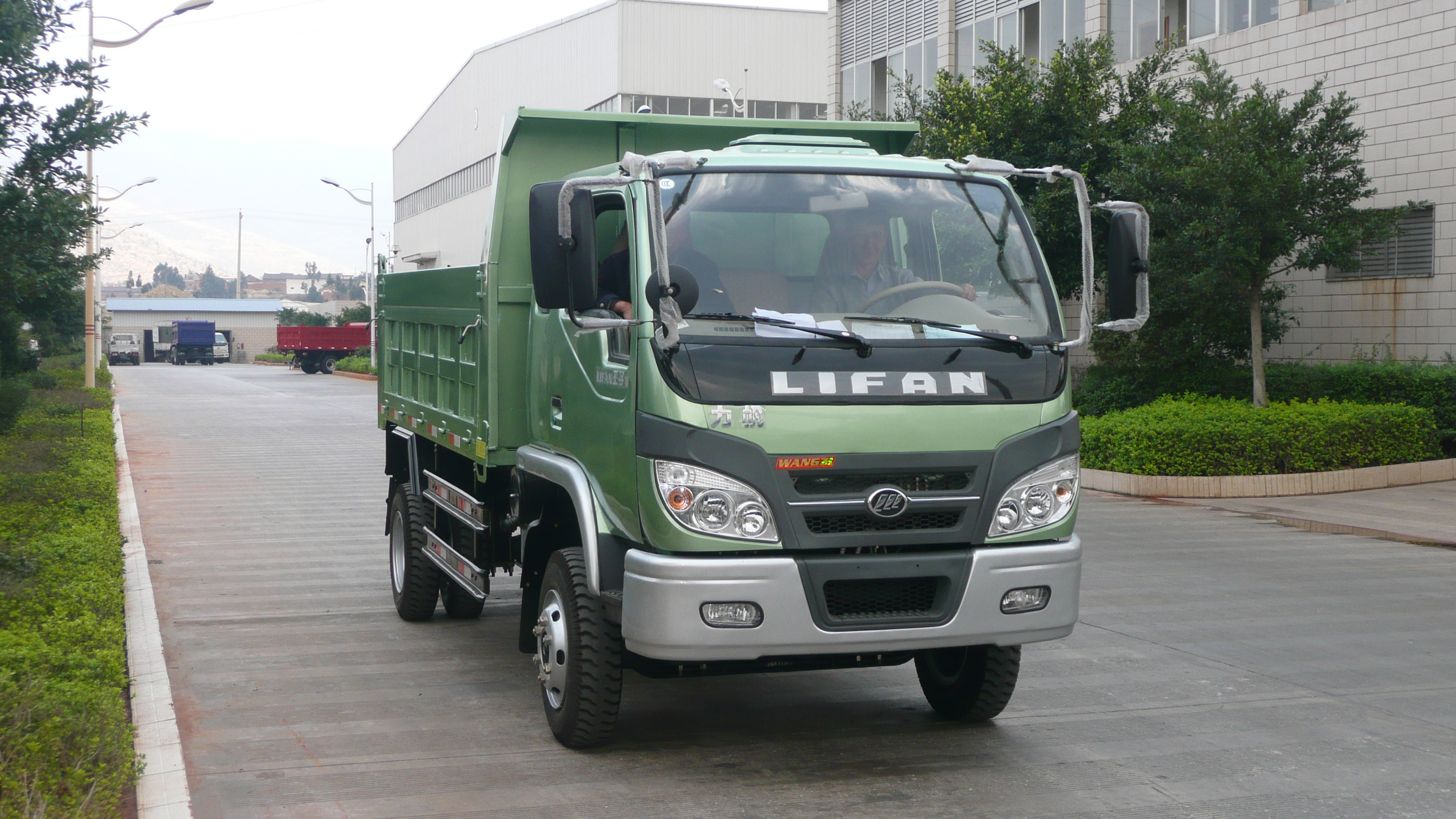
Lifan Truck

== Operations ==
=== Production facilities ===
Lifan has two passenger-car assembly plants in China.

Now boasting motorcycle production bases in Thailand, Iran, Turkey, and Vietnam, Lifan first established a presence in Vietnam in 1999 that made motorcycles and parts. Beginning in March 2007, assembly of the 520 sedan commenced in Vietnam. By mid-2009, the 320, 520i, and 620 had also been built or assembled in this country.

Overseas assembly factories make Lifan-branded automobiles sold to domestic audiences but are not necessarily affiliated with Lifan in any way.

Azerbaijan

In early 2010, Lifan established an automobile assembly factory in Azerbaijan.

Egypt

Such assembly has occurred in Egypt.

Ethiopia

From 2007 until 2010, the Lifan 520 was assembled in Ethiopia from imported knock-down kits under the name of "Abay" (Amharic for the Blue Nile) by Holland Car Company. Cars assembled in Ethiopia may now bear the Lifan name, and an after sales service center for Lifan automobiles exists in the capital, Addis Ababa, as of 2010. As of 2016, Lifan continues to produce in Ethiopia (perhaps without a local partner), assembling cars with native-born labor from knock-down kits. Five different models can be made at the current facility, set up in 2014, and sales can total fifty cars a month at prices ranging from $15,000 to $30,000.

Iran

Lifan was assembling cars in Iran around 2010.

Russia

Assembly of automobiles in Russia began in August 2007, and in early 2011, the 320 model became the third Lifan product to see local production.

Uruguay

In 2010, a 40,000 units/year production capacity assembly plant was established in Uruguay.

Philippines

In 2018 Lifan Philippines was launched in MIAS which only sold cars. There are no Lifan bikes have been sold in the Philippines officially.

=== Research and development ===
At the end of 2006, Lifan held over 3,800 patents, the largest number of any Chinese automobile company, of which at least 346 of were held by Lifan's automobile division.

== Sales ==
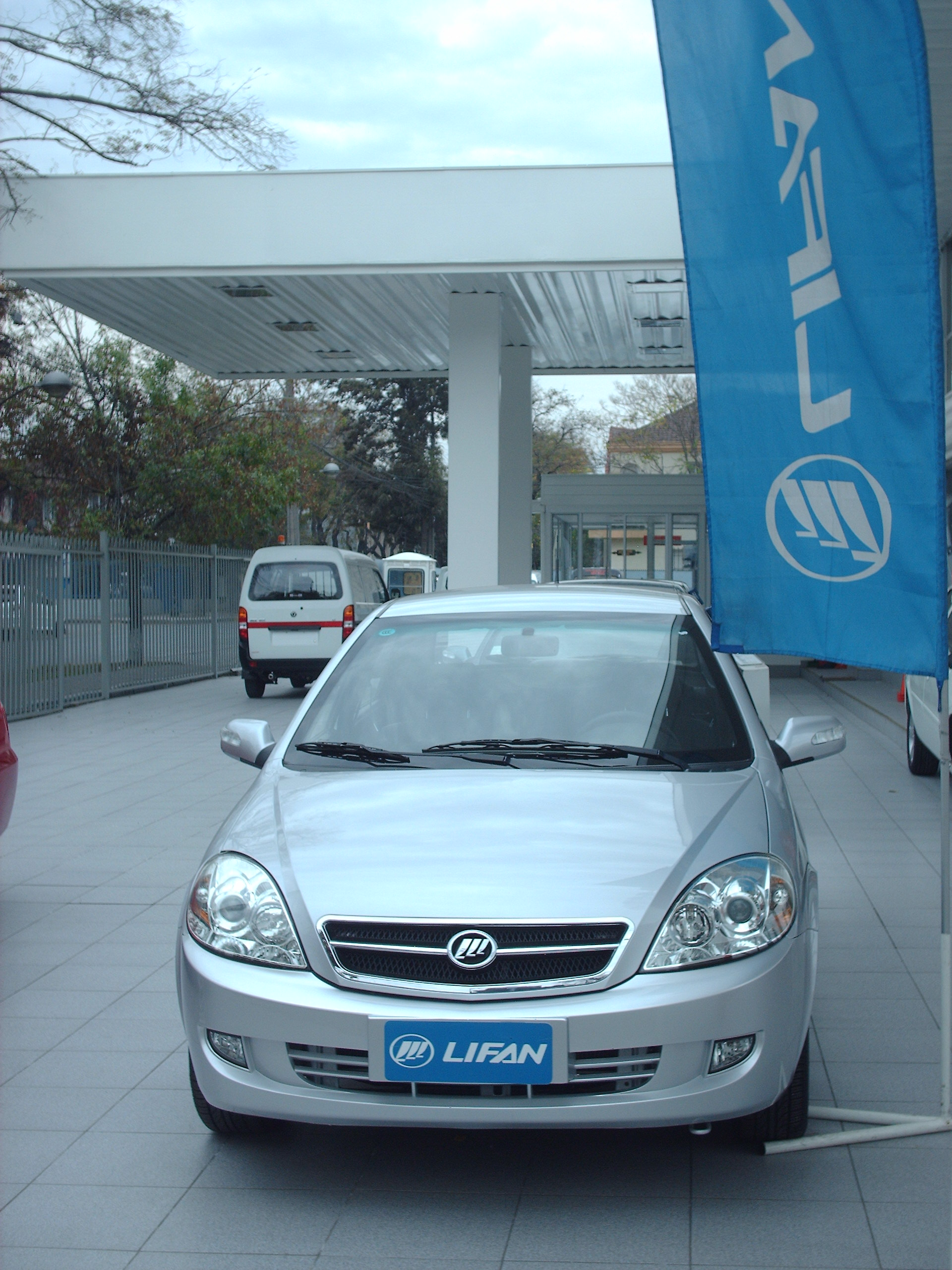
A Lifan 520 at a dealership in Chile in 2009

Access to profitable export markets, something the Chinese State allowed the company in 1998, means that this maker of automobiles and motorcycles does what many Chinese automakers desire: it sells in developed overseas markets like the EU, Singapore and Japan.

While finding more markets for its motorcycle-related products, Lifan has exported passenger cars to 51 countries. In 2010, its automotive exports were rivaled by only Chery. The company has sold in many countries and in every continent except Antarctica.

Allowed access in 2003, Lifan motorcycle products are sold in 18 European countries. The Italian importer Martin Motors rebadges and sells two small Lifan passenger car models under its own name.

Lifan has sold motorcycles in Japan since 2001. Lifan automobiles have been sold in Laos and Syria since 2009.

Lifan motorcycles and dirt bikes are available in Canada and Mexico. As of 2009, a single model was on offer in this country.

Some small passenger car models are sold in Brazil, Guatemala, Peru, and Uruguay.

Some of the cars Lifan exports are in the form of knock-down kits. Put together in small, local workshops, selling such kits is an easy way for the company to gain access to developing markets.

== Sponsorships ==
Lifan was formerly the owner of the Chinese super league football team Chongqing Lifan; since 2005 it has been a sponsor of the team.
