= Lifan Foison =

Chinese microvan

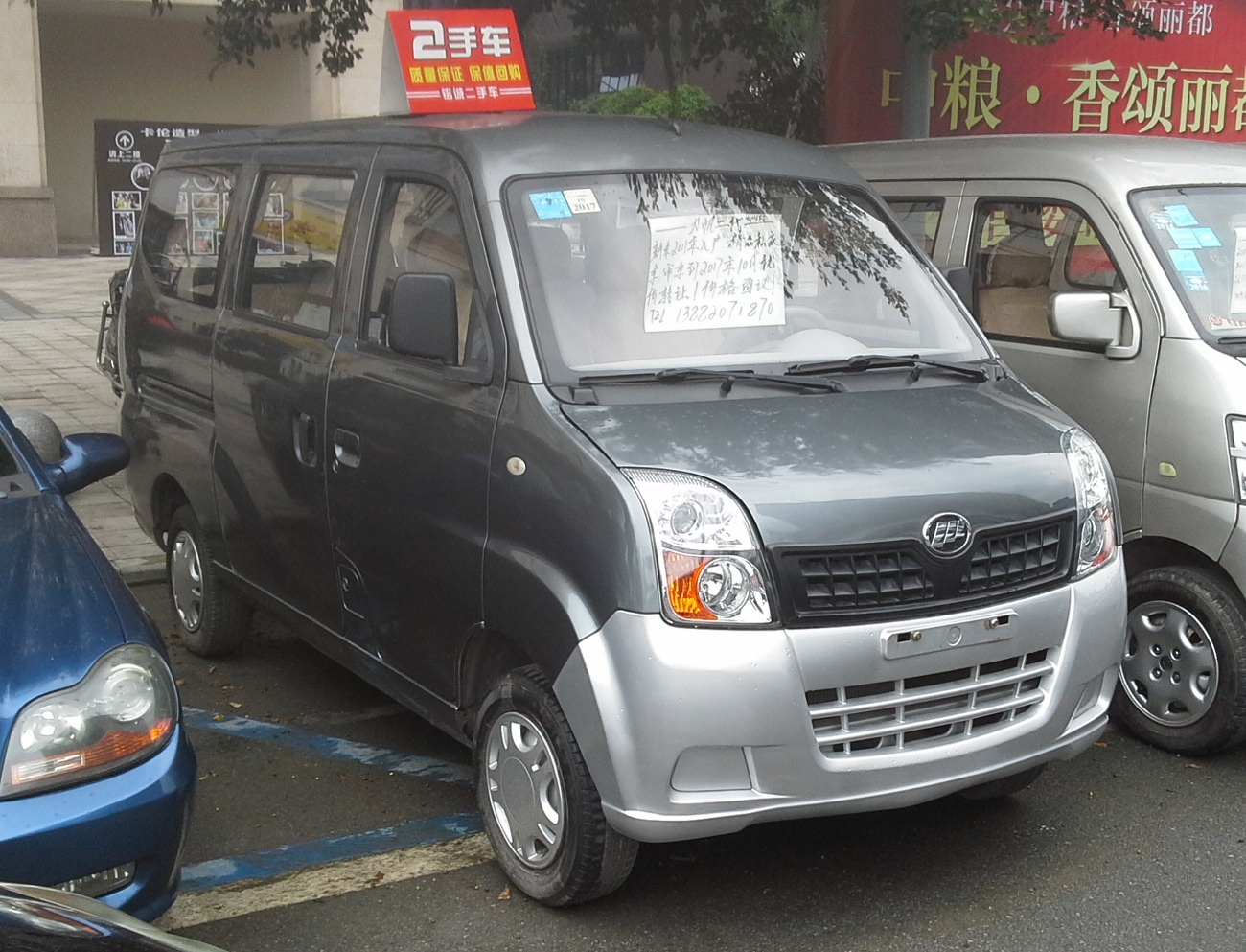

Overview
- Manufacturer: Lifan Group
- Also called: Lifan Fengshun; LF465Q5
- Production: 2011–2021
- Assembly: Chongqing, China

Body and chassis
- Class: Microvan
- Body style: 5-door microvan; 2-door pickup truck
- Layout: Mid engine, rear-wheel drive

Powertrain
- Engine: 1.0L I4 petrol engine; 1.3L I4 petrol engine
- Transmission: 5-speed manual

Dimensions
- Wheelbase: 2,525 mm (99.4 in)
- Length: 4,015 mm (158.1 in)
- Width: 1,600 mm (63.0 in)
- Height: 1,900 mm (74.8 in)

The Lifan Foison or Lifan Fengshun (Chinese: 丰顺) is a five- to eight-seater microvan made by Lifan Group, the Chinese automaker. Introduced in 2011, the Lifan Foison range is based on the earlier LF6361 series which is related to the 1999 Daihatsu Atrai.

== Overview ==
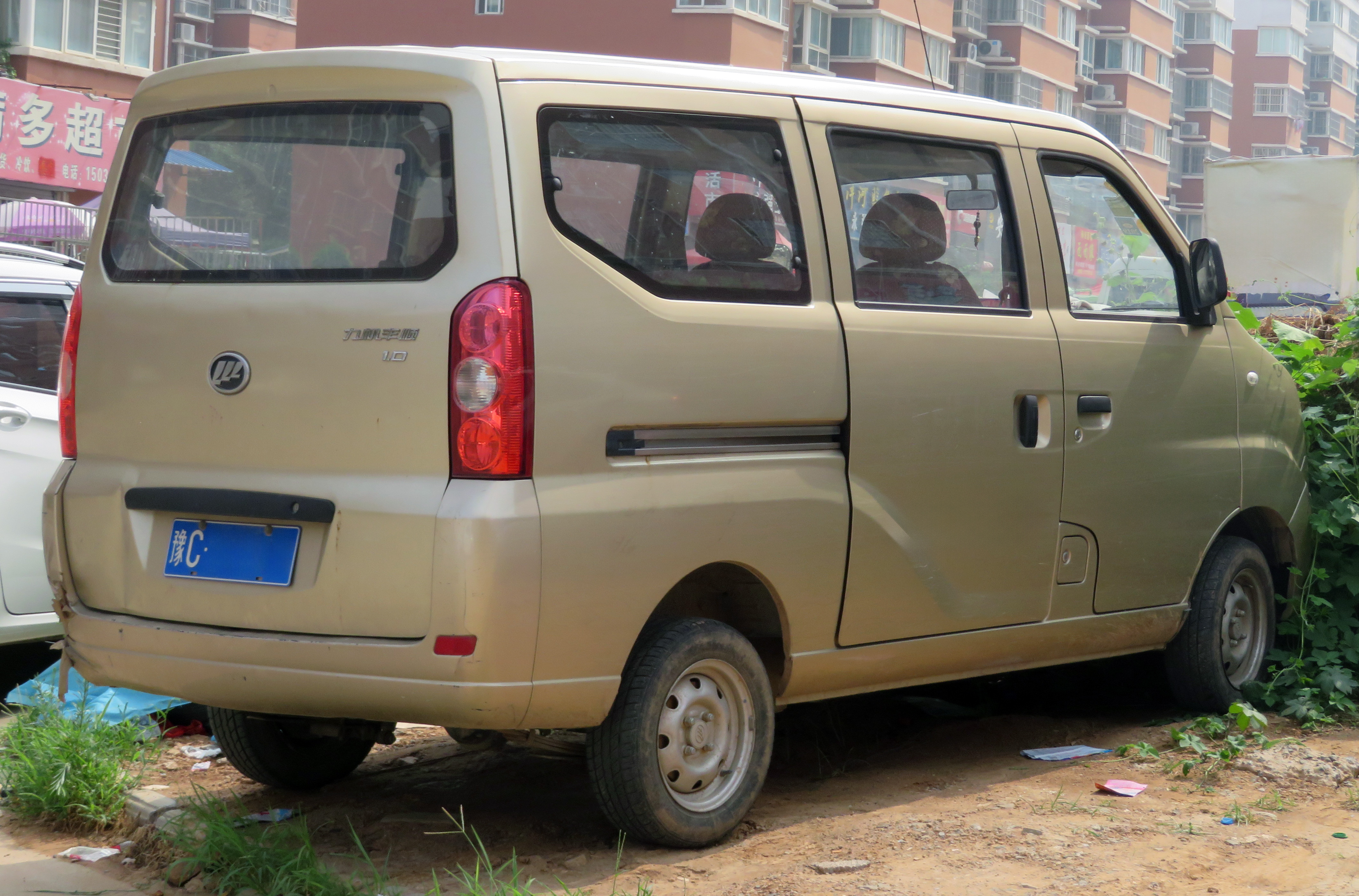
Lifan Fengshun van (China)

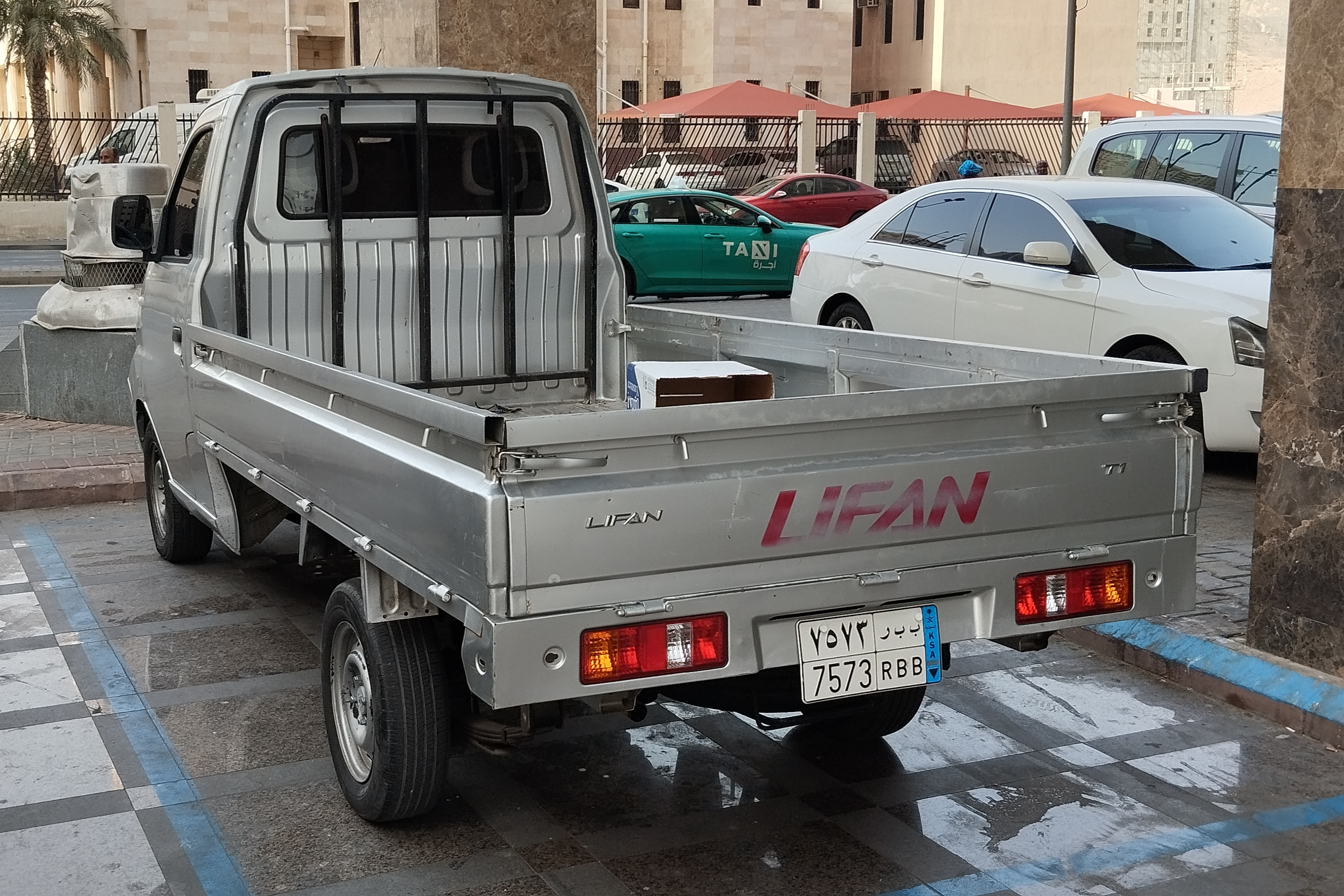
Lifan T11 pickup (Saudi Arabia)

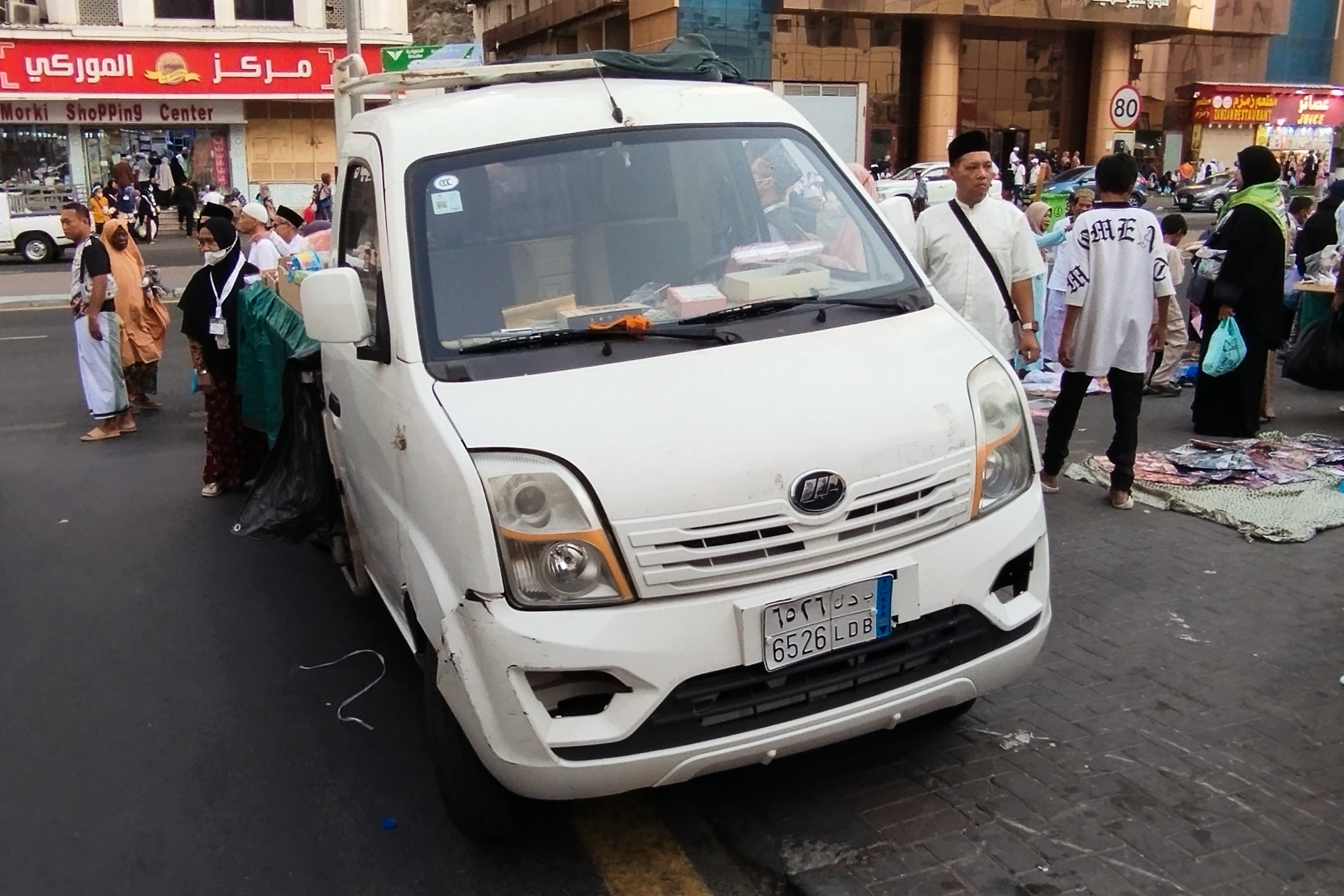
Lifan T11 pickup (facelift, Saudi Arabia)

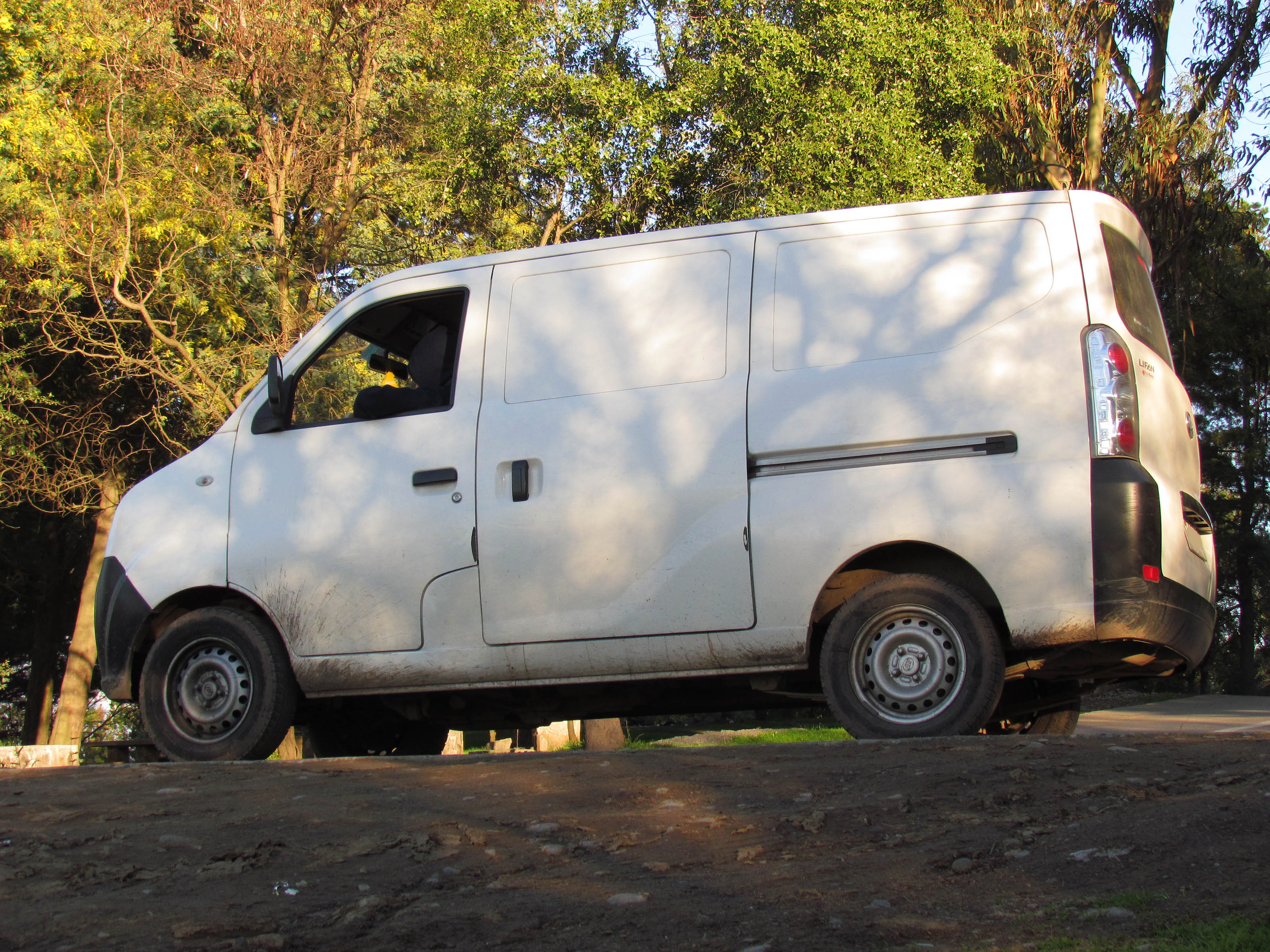
Lifan LF panel van (Chile)

A total of 12 trim levels of the Lifan Foison is available in China, and the engine options includes a 1.0-liter producing 40 kW (53 hp) and a 1.3-liter producing 51 kW (68 hp).

Prices of the Lifan Foison ranges from 32,800 yuan to 49,380 yuan before the discontinuation in the Chinese market.
