= Lifan Lotto =

Compact MPV manufactured by Lifan

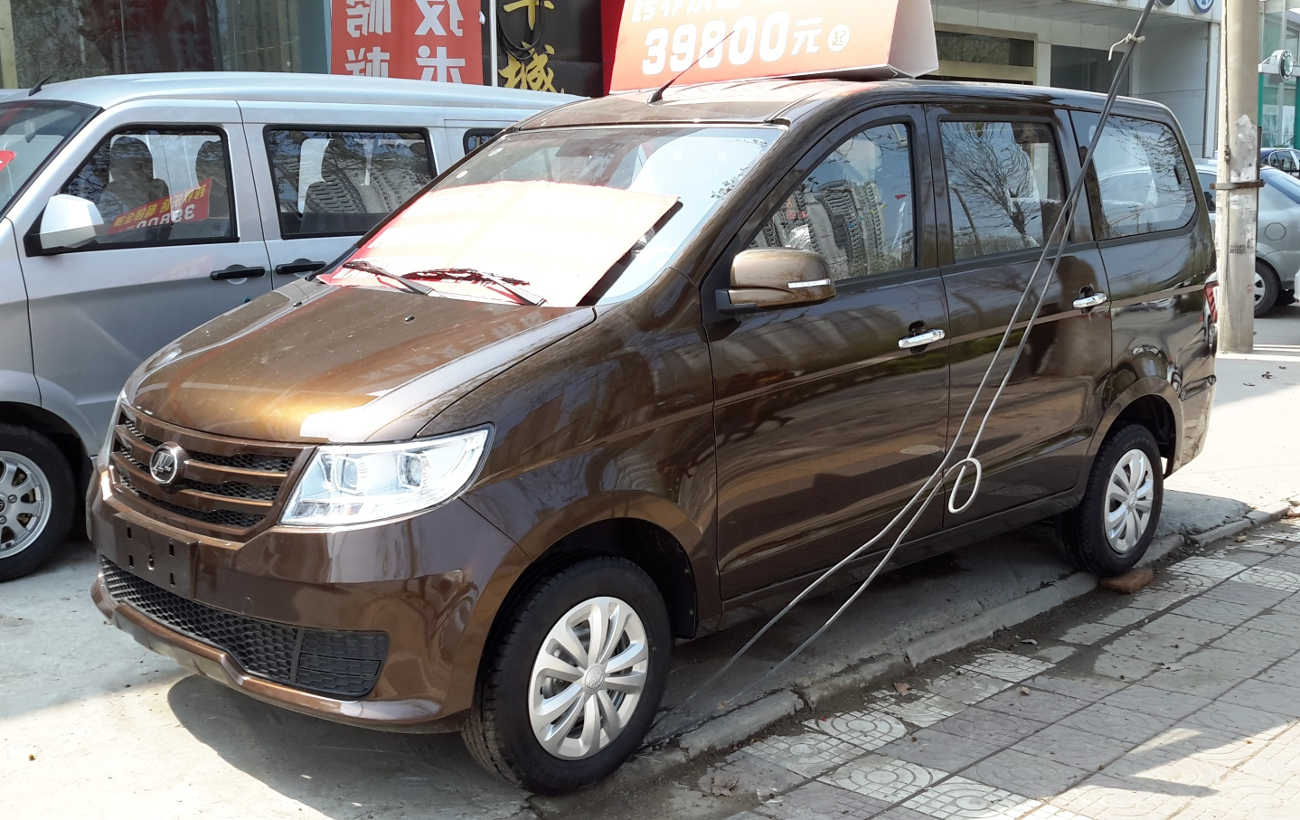

Overview
- Manufacturer: Lifan Group
- Production: 2014–2018
- Model years: 2015–2018
- Assembly: Chongqing, China

Body and chassis
- Class: Compact MPV
- Body style: 5-door wagon
- Layout: Front-engine, front-wheel-drive

Powertrain
- Engine: 1.5 L I4 petrol); 1.2 L I4 (petrol)
- Transmission: 5-speed manual; 5-speed automatic

Dimensions
- Wheelbase: 2,720 mm (107.1 in)
- Length: 4,350 mm (171.3 in)
- Width: 1,730 mm (68.1 in)
- Height: 1,800 mm (70.9 in)

The Lifan Lotto (Chinese: 乐途) is a 7-seater compact MPV produced by Lifan Group.

== Overview ==
The Lifan Lotto debuted in July 2015 on the Chinese auto market with prices ranging from 40,800 yuan to 43,800 yuan at launch and was later adjusted to a range from 35,800 yuan to 59,800 yuan.

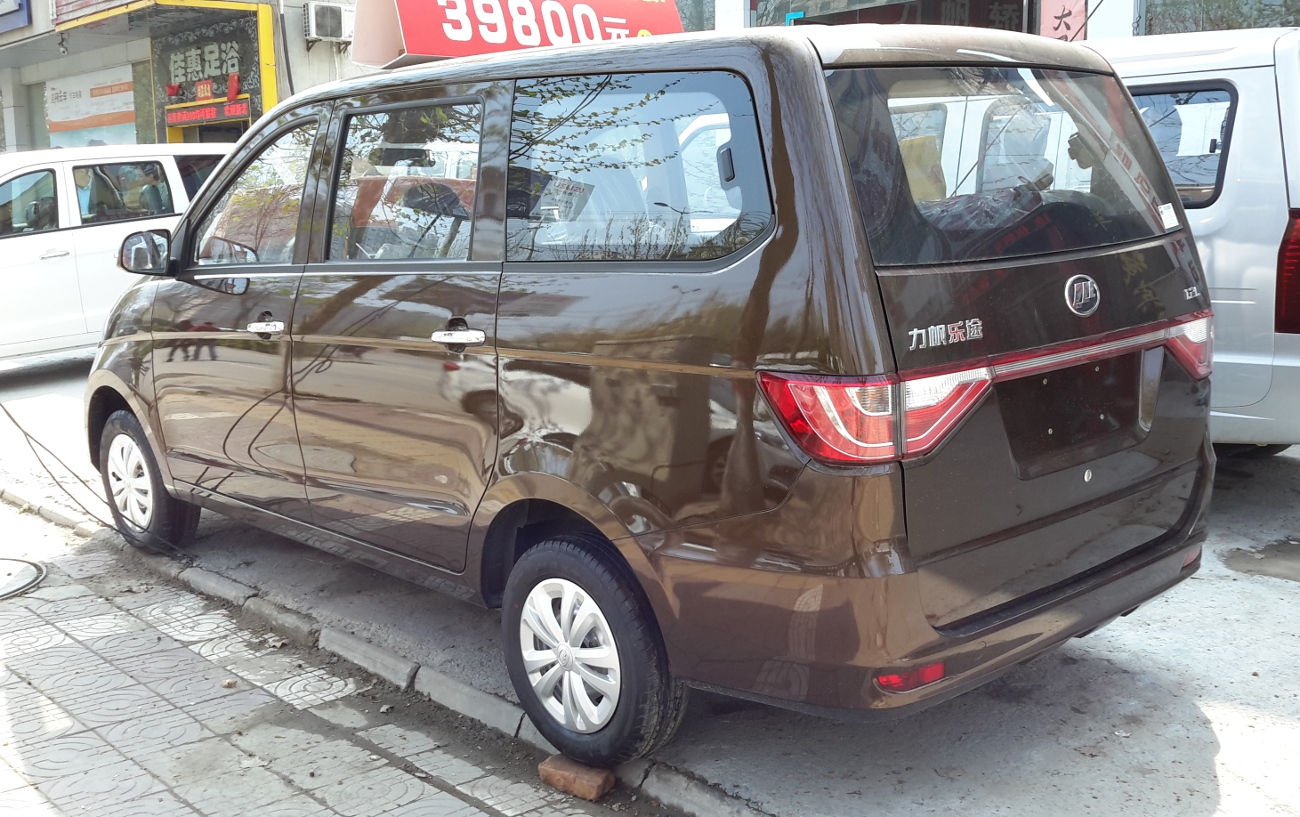
Lifan Lotto rear

== Engine and transmission ==
The engine options of the Lifan Lotto includes a 1.2-liter four-cylinder petrol engine producing 63 kW (84 hp) and 108 N⋅m (80 lb⋅ft) or a 1.5-liter four-cylinder petrol engine producing 81 kW (109 hp) and 145 N⋅m (107 lb⋅ft). Transmission options include a five-speed manual gearbox and a five-speed automatic gearbox.
