= Lifan Xuanlang =

Chinese MPV

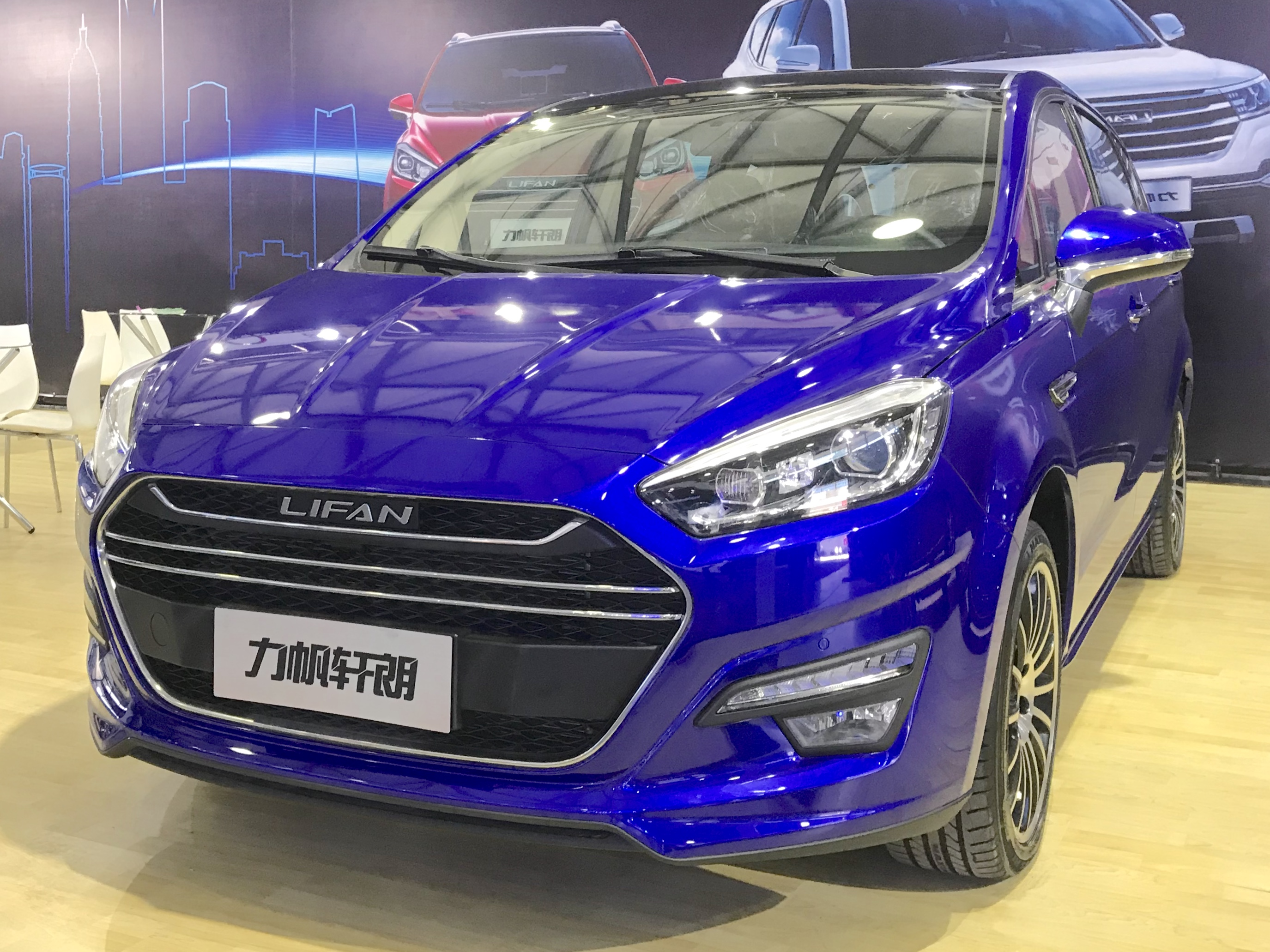

Overview
- Manufacturer: Lifan Motors, part of Lifan Group
- Production: 2017–2020
- Assembly: China; Russia; Tunisia

Body and chassis
- Class: Large MPV (M)
- Body style: 5-door MPV
- Layout: Front-engine, front-wheel-drive

Powertrain
- Engine: 1.5 L I4; 1.8 L I4; 2.0 I4
- Transmission: 5-speed manual; CVT; 8-speed semi-automatic

Dimensions
- Wheelbase: 2,780 mm (109.4 in)
- Length: 4,720 mm (185.8 in)
- Width: 1,840 mm (72.4 in)
- Height: 1,665 mm (65.6 in)
- Curb weight: 1,540–1,630 kg (3,400–3,590 lb)

The Lifan Xuanlang (Chinese: 轩朗) is a 7-seater MPV produced by Lifan for the Chinese market.

== Overview ==
The Lifan Xuanlang was unveiled on the 2016 Guangzhou Auto Show in China and was priced from 69,800 yuan to 106,800 yuan at launch.

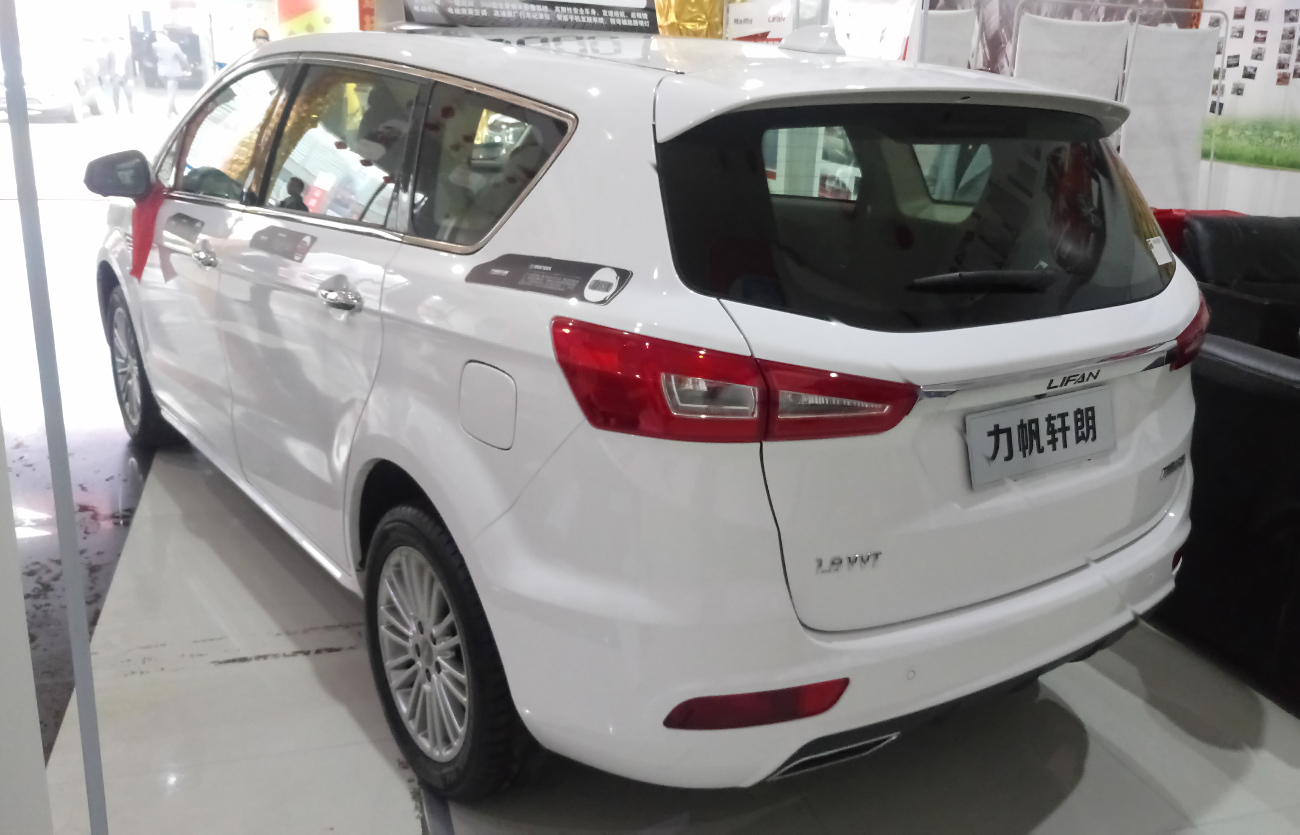
Lifan Xuanlang rear view

== Design controversy ==
Styling of the Lifan Xuanlang was controversial as the exterior design of the Lifan Xuanlang was heavily inspired by the 2015 Ford S-Max.
