= Lifan Xingshun =

Chinese microvan

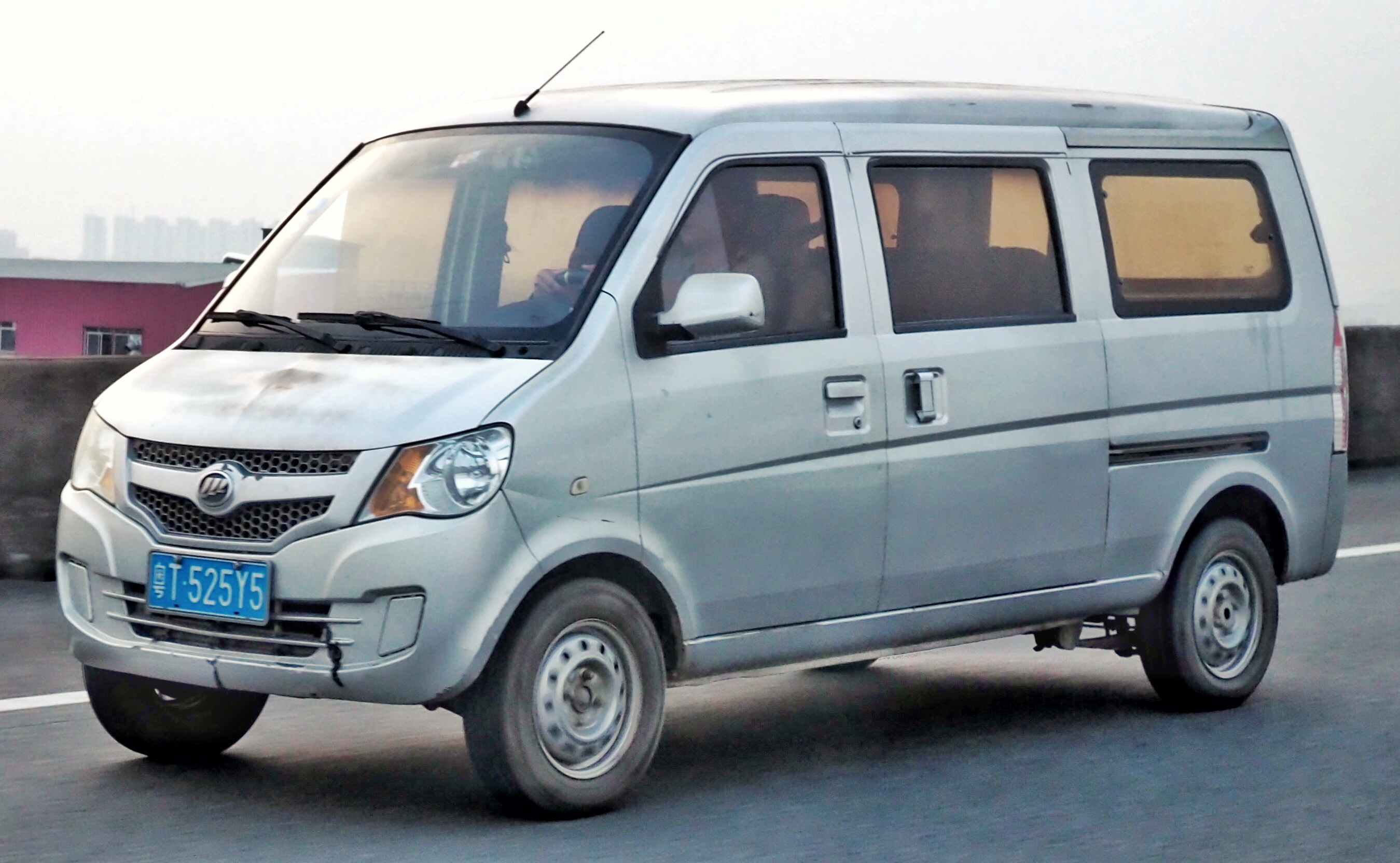

Overview
- Manufacturer: Lifan Group
- Production: 2011–2022
- Assembly: Chongqing, China

Body and chassis
- Class: Microvan
- Body style: 5-door microvan

Powertrain
- Engine: 1.0L I4 petrol engine; 1.3L I4 petrol engine
- Transmission: 5-speed manual

Dimensions
- Wheelbase: 2,850 mm (112.2 in)
- Length: 4,201 mm (165.4 in)
- Width: 1,650 mm (65.0 in)
- Height: 1,908 mm (75.1 in)

The Lifan Xingshun (Chinese: 兴顺) is a five- to eight-seater microvan made by Lifan Group, the Chinese automaker.

== Overview ==
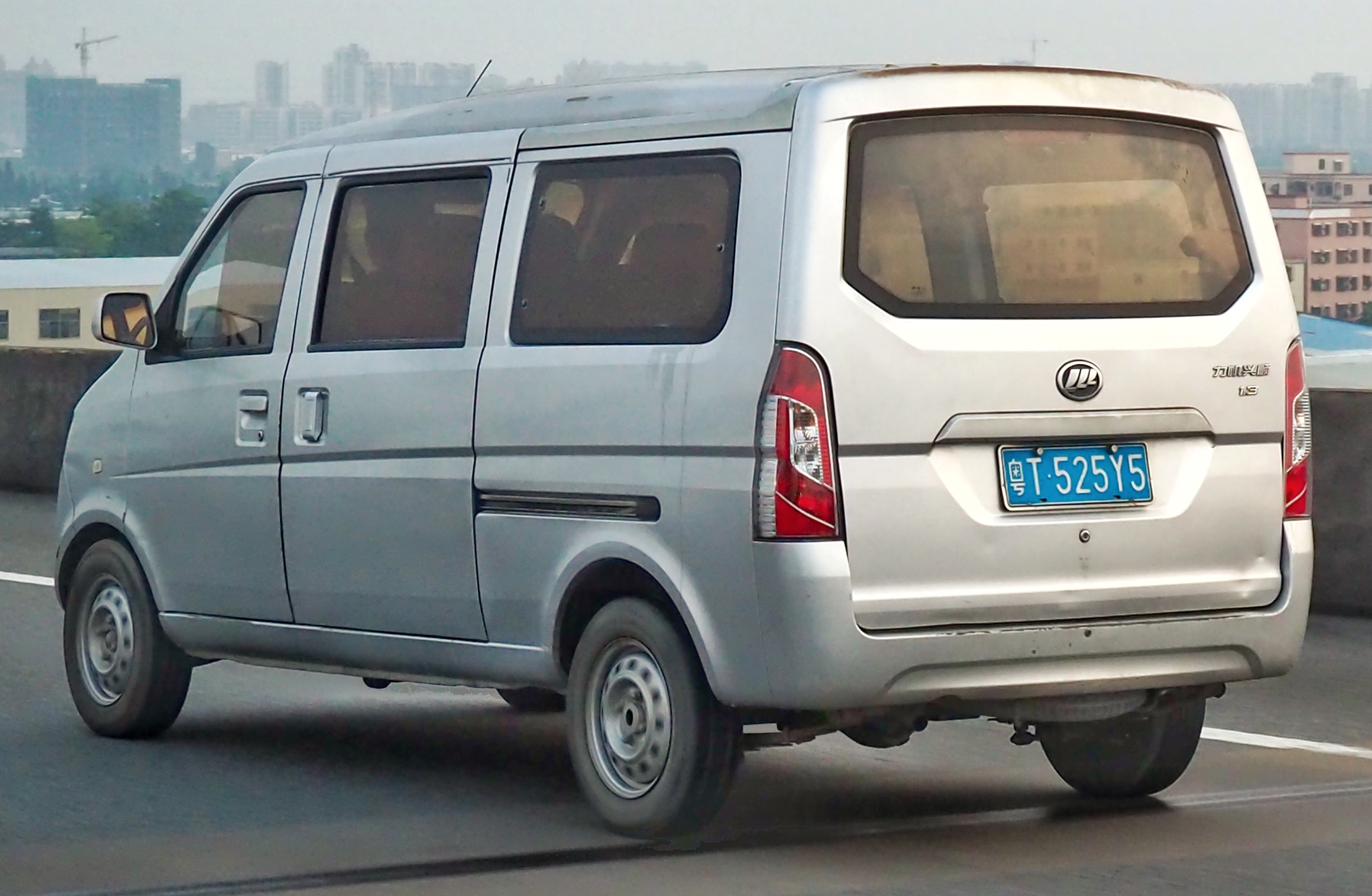
2011 Lifan Xingshun (rear)

The Xingshun was introduced in 2011 with prices ranging from 37,800 yuan to 45,800 yuan. The Xingshun is powered by Lifan engines including a 1.0-litre engine and a 1.3-litre engine.

=== Lifan DC truck ===
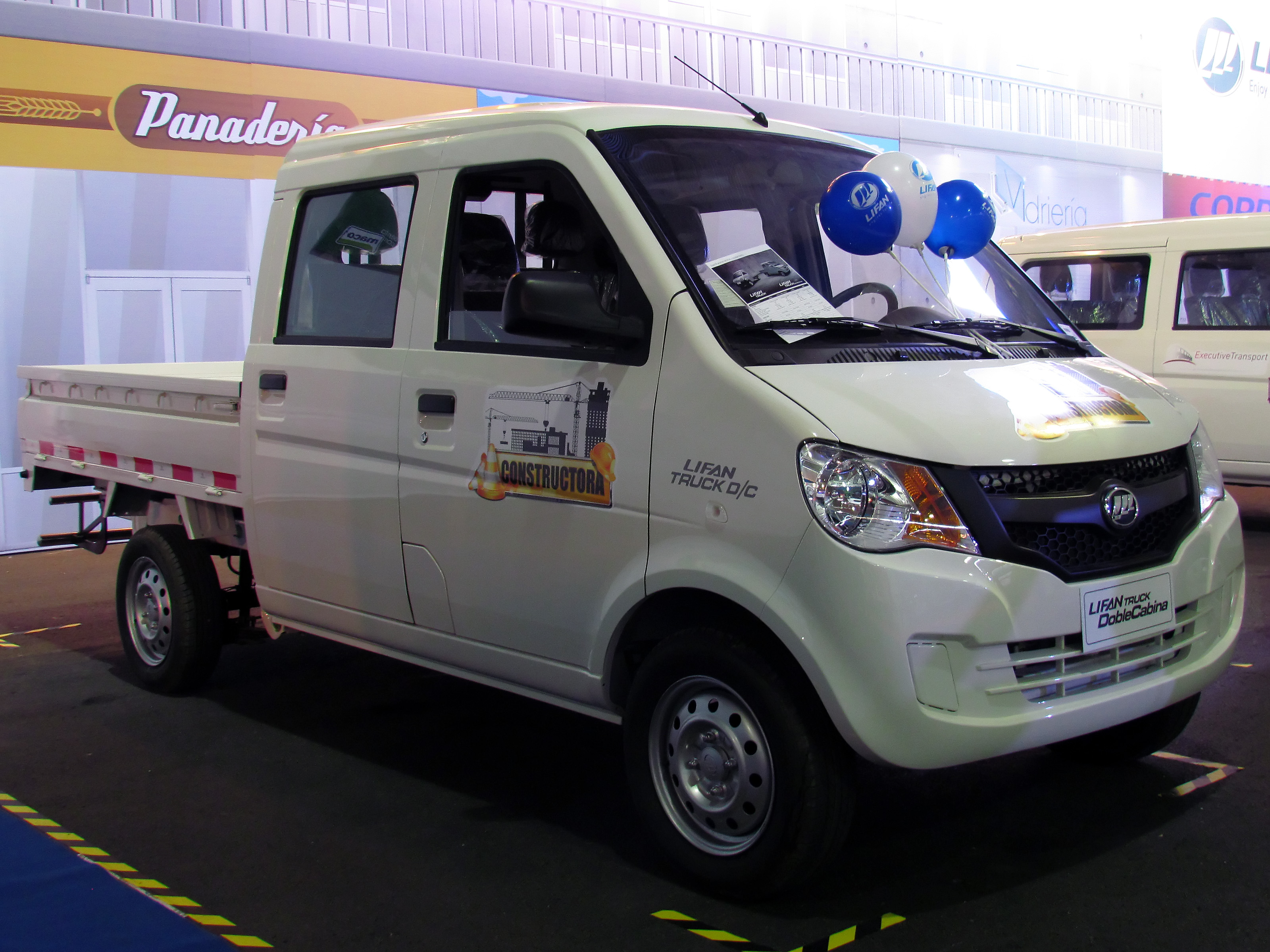
2014 Lifan DC truck

A pickup variant of the Lifan Xingshun called the DC was also available as a double cab pickup, with the body before the B-pillars shared with the microvan.
