= Lifan X80 =

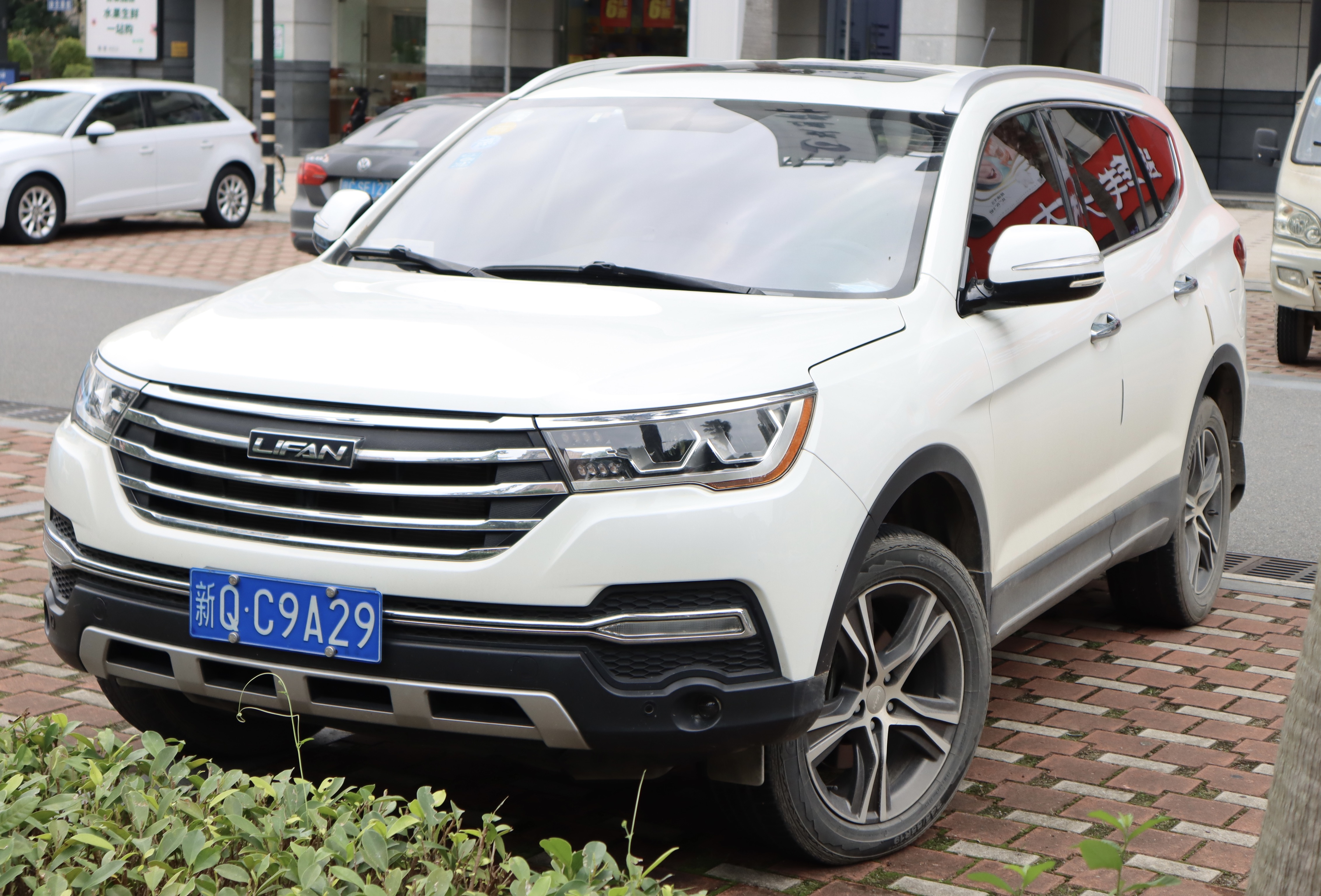

Overview
- Manufacturer: Lifan Group
- Production: 2017–2020
- Assembly: Chongqing, China

Body and chassis
- Class: Mid-size crossover SUV
- Body style: SUV
- Layout: Front-engine, front-wheel-drive

Powertrain
- Engine: 2.0 L LF483ZLQ I4
- Transmission: 6 speed manual 6 speed automatic

Dimensions
- Wheelbase: 2,790 mm (109.8 in)
- Length: 4,820 mm (189.8 in)
- Width: 1,930 mm (76.0 in)
- Height: 1,760 mm (69.3 in)

The Lifan X80 is a Chinese four-door mid-size crossover SUV produced by the Lifan Motors division of Lifan Group.

== History ==
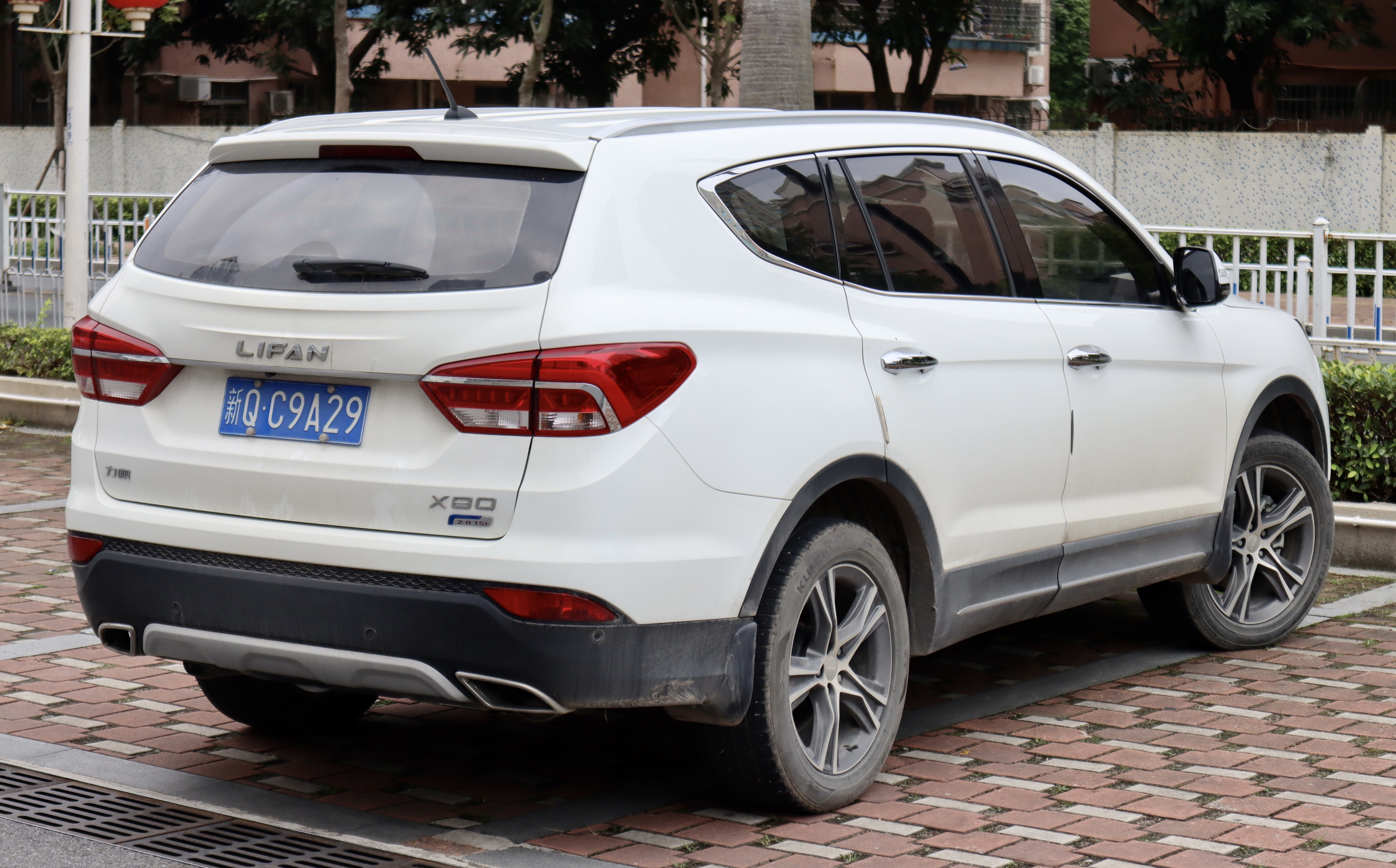
Lifan X80 rear

In November 2016, the Lifan X80 debuted at the 2016 Guangzhou Auto Show. In March 2017, the Lifan X80 was launched. Only one engine was offered at launch. A 2.0 litre turbo-charged petrol engine capable of producing 142 kW (191 hp) and 286 N⋅m (211 lb⋅ft) of torque. There was two transmissions offered: a 6-speed manual gearbox or a 6-speed automatic gearbox.
