= Lifan X60 =

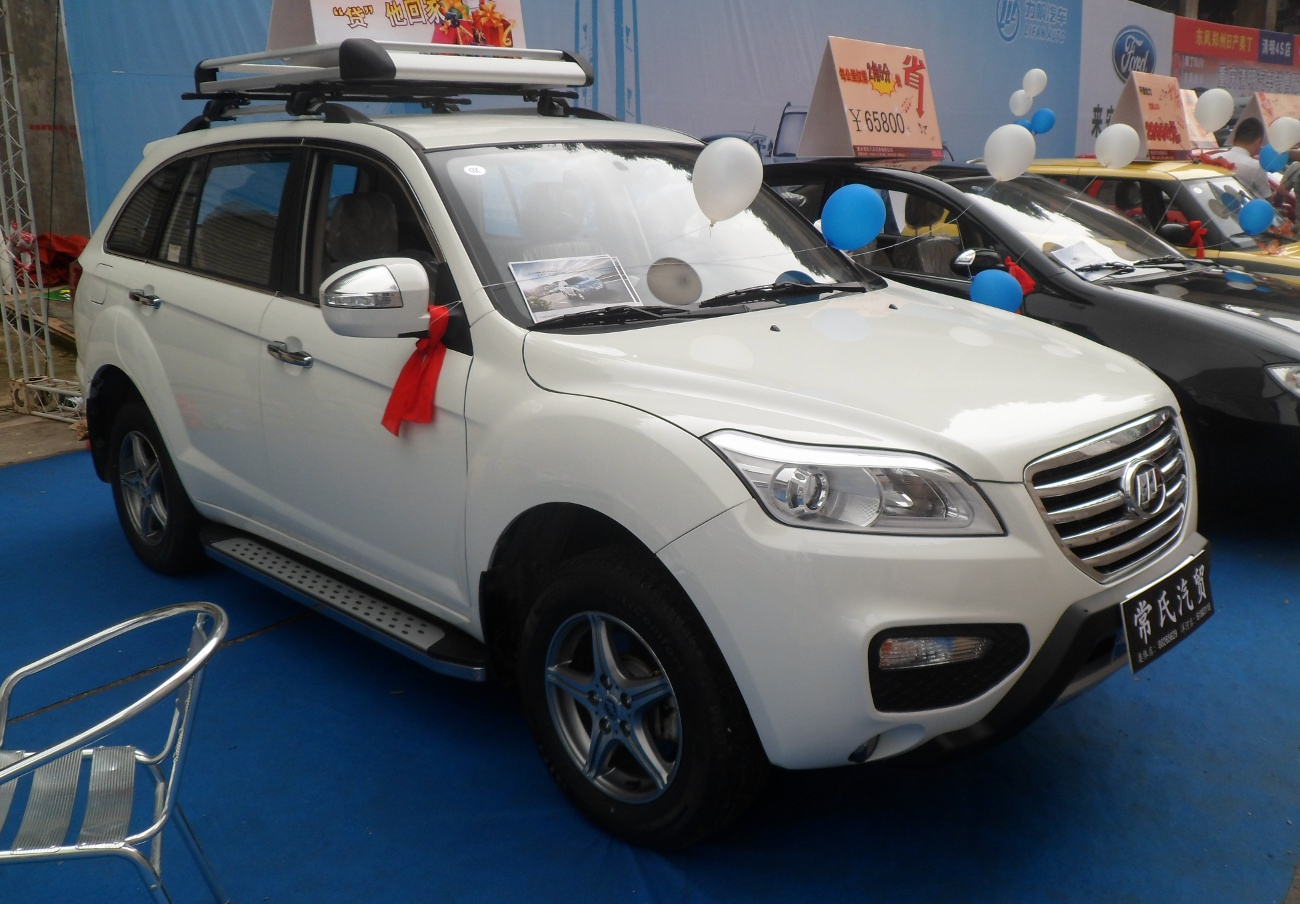

Overview
- Manufacturer: Lifan
- Also called: Lifan SUV
- Production: 2011–2018
- Assembly: China: Chongqing; Russia: Cherkessk (Derways); Azerbaijan: Nakhchivan (NAZ); Iran: Kerman (KMC); Uruguay: San José; Myanmar (MGM CO..LTD)

Body and chassis
- Class: Compact crossover SUV
- Body style: 4-door wagon

Powertrain
- Engine: 1.8 L LFB479Q I4
- Transmission: 5-speed manual; CVT automatic

Dimensions
- Wheelbase: 2,600 mm (102.4 in)
- Length: 4,325 mm (170.3 in)
- Width: 1,790 mm (70.5 in)
- Height: 1,690 mm (66.5 in)
- Curb weight: 1,330 kg (2,930 lb)

The Lifan X60 is a Chinese four-door compact crossover SUV produced by the Lifan Motors, division of Lifan Group.

== Overview ==
The Lifan X60 was initially unveiled as a preview at the 2010 Shanghai Auto Show as the Lifan CUV concept, and the production version was formally launched at the 2011 Beijing Auto Show as the X60.

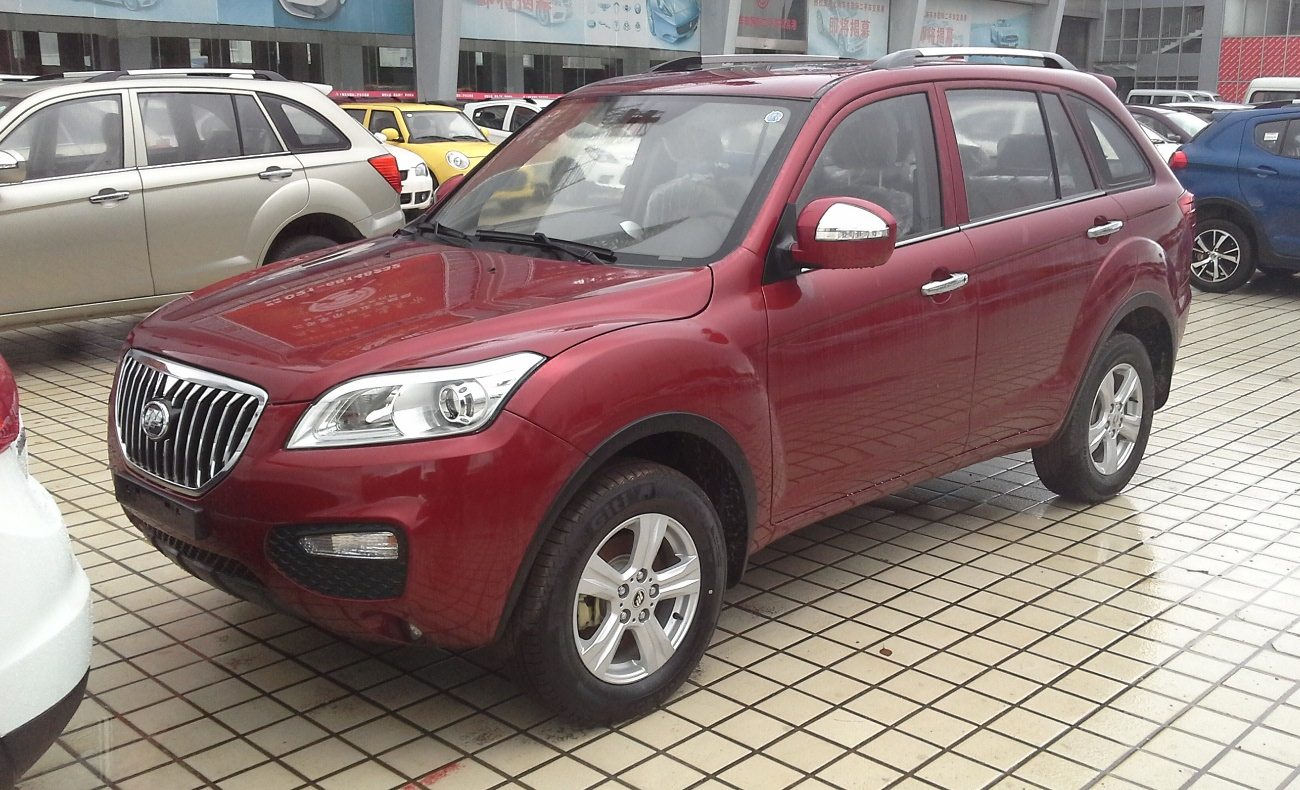
Lifan X60 front

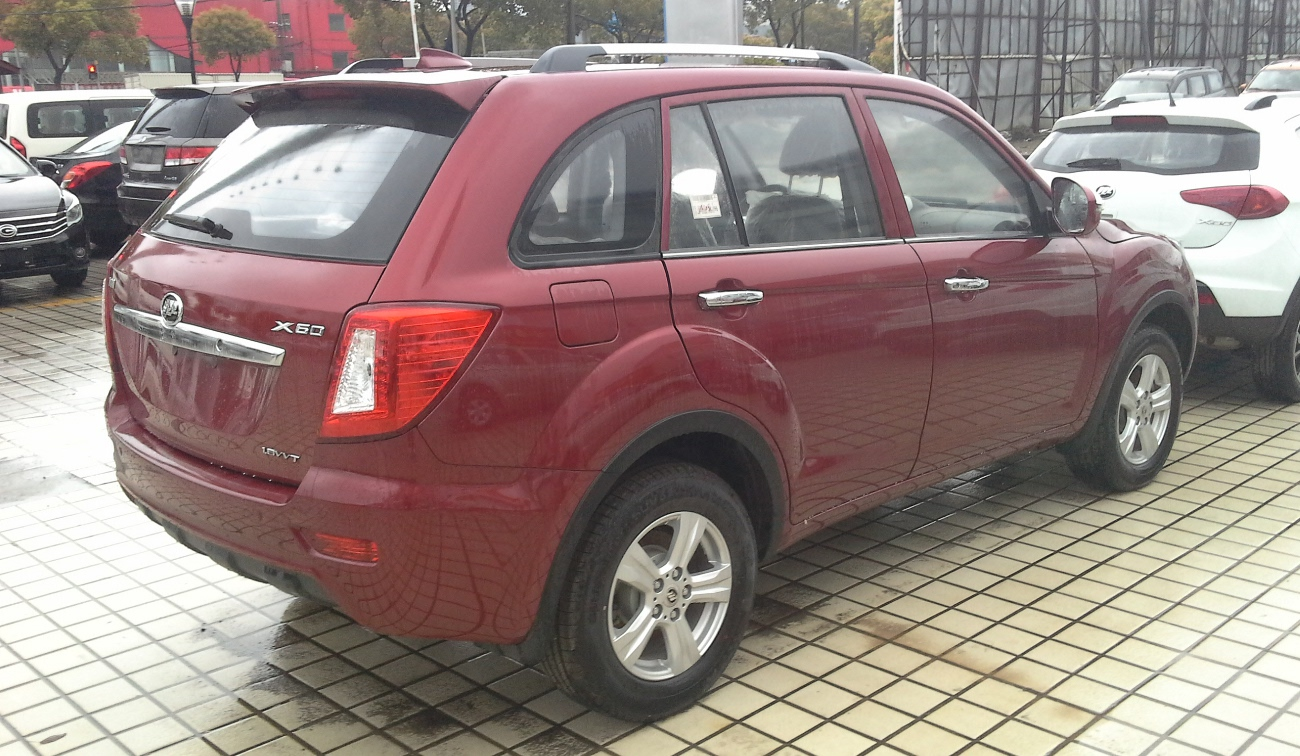
Lifan X60 rear

=== China Offroad Championship ===
After the motor sport events participated by the Lifan 320, Lifan has been preparing for the X60 to participate in the China Offroad Championship from April 2013.

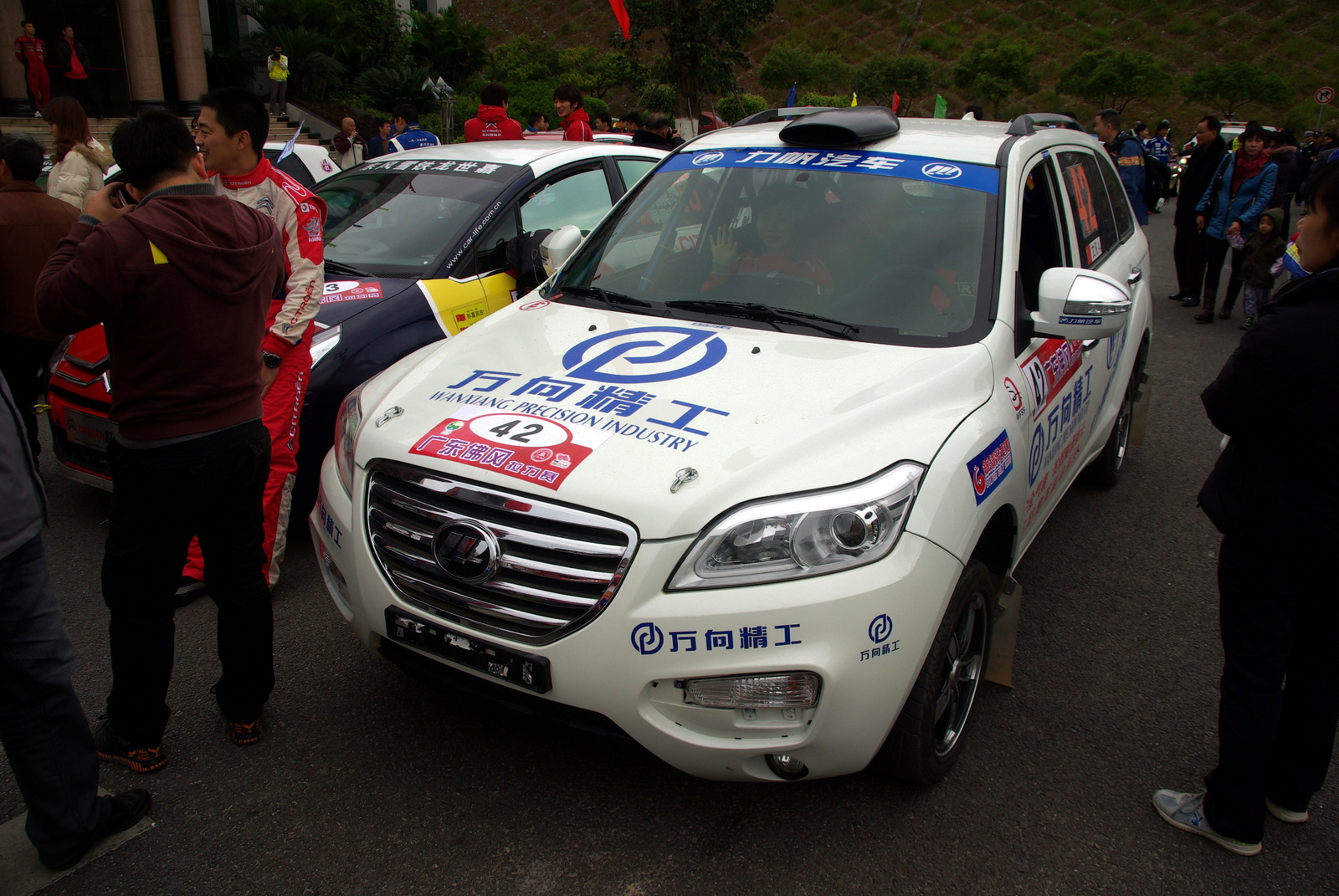
Lifan X60 rally car front

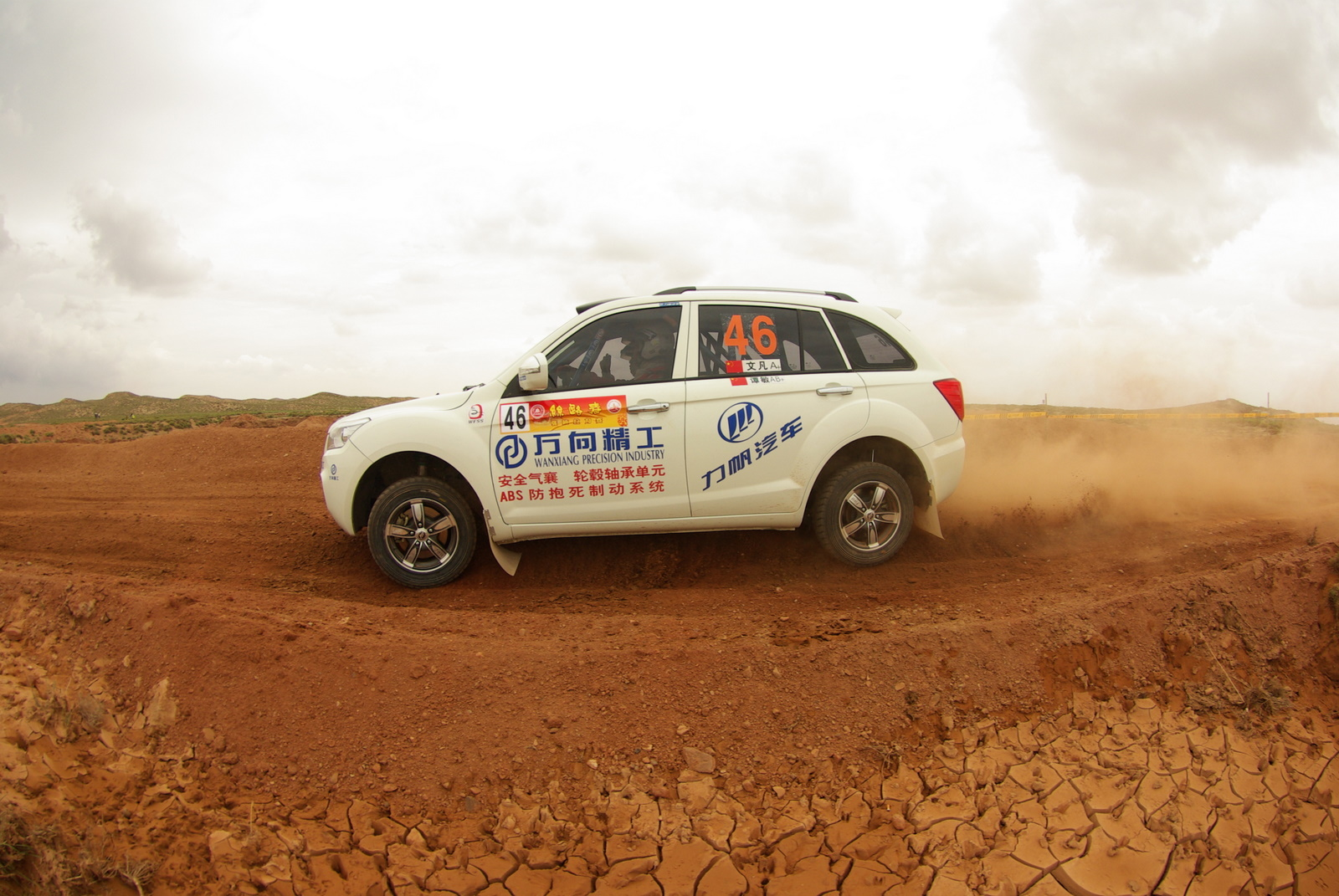
Lifan X60 rally car side

=== Powertrain ===
The Lifan X60 is powered by a 4-cylinder 1.8 L (1794cc) engine producing 98 kW (133 PS; 131 bhp) and torque of 168 N⋅m (124 lb⋅ft).

=== Overseas markets ===
The Lifan X60 was also assembled in Iran and had many problems. One of the major drawbacks of the car gearbox is a steep first-gear ratio, causing vibration on initial acceleration. The drivetrain of the Lifan X60 was originally designed for the Lifan 620, and the engine was later shared with the heavy body of the X60, and as a result, it performed poorly. The clutch of the X60 heats up and burns when driving uphill due to the tall first-gear ratio of the gearbox.
