= Economy of Nakhchivan =

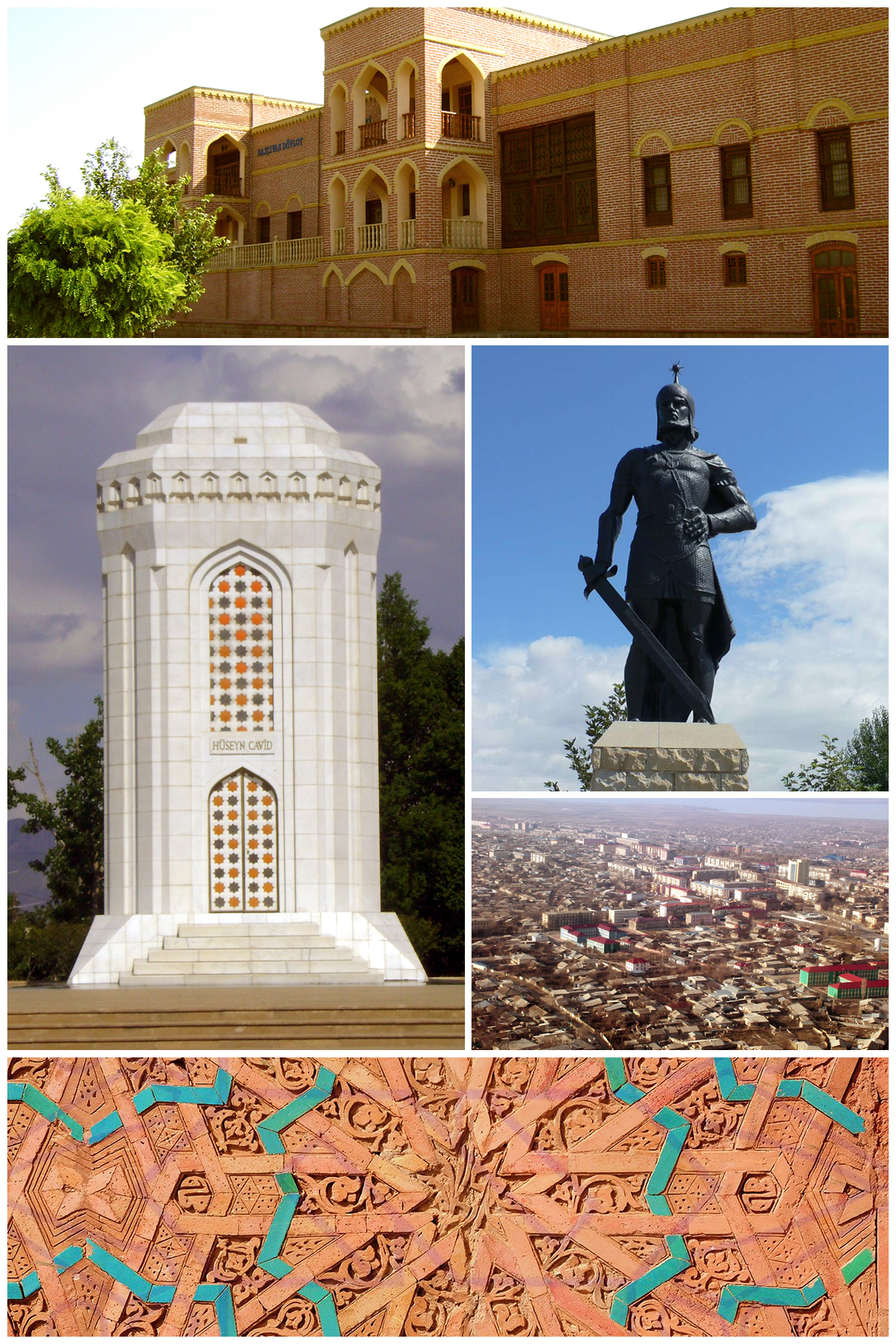

Economy of Nakhchivan covers the issues related to the economy of the city of Nakhchivan, is the most important center of economic activity in Azerbaijan.

== State programs ==
Over the past period, several state programs have been adopted for the development of the economy in Azerbaijan. The "State Program on Socio-Economic Development of the Regions of the Republic of Azerbaijan for the period of 2004-2008 and the "State Program on Socio-economic Development of the Regions of the Republic of Azerbaijan in 2009-2013". were adopted, providing both economic development in the capital and regions. The "Regional Development Program of the Nakhchivan Autonomous Republic (2005-2008)" and "The Socio-Economic Development of Nakhchivan Autonomous Republic for 2009-2013" approved by the Chairman of the Supreme Assembly of Nakhchivan ensured the use of investment opportunity in the autonomous republic, the creation of new industrial, agricultural enterprises, raising the level of employment, and further improvement of the education, health and other social security of the population.

== Gross Domestic Product ==
The gross domestic product, which is considered as the main factor of economic development, was 2.339 billion manat in 2013, has increased by 8.4 times, compared to the same period of 2003. In 2013, the gross domestic product per capita increased by 6.9 times in comparison with 2003 and amounted to 5423 manat. Compared to 2003, the industrial output increased by 49 times in 2013, investments directed to fixed capital by 16.4 times, agricultural sector by 4.7 times, transport sector by 2.6 times, information and communication services by 10.3 times, retail trade turnover by 11.1 times, income per capita by 8.8 times, and the average monthly salary increased by 9.8 times. "Regulations on Industrial Parks" were approved by the Decree of the Chairman of the Supreme Assembly of Nakhchivan dated June 6, 2013. By the end of 2003, 66 industrial enterprises functioned in the Autonomous Republic, and by the end of 2013 this indicator increased 7 times, reached to 438.

== Power station ==
The Nakhchivan Module Power Plant with a capacity of 87 megawatts, the Bilav Hydro Power Plant with a capacity of 22 megawatts, the Arpachay-1 Hydro Power Plant with a capacity of 20.5 megawatts, hydro power plant with the capacity of 4.5 megawatts on the Heydar Aliyev Water Reservoir were built, and Nakhchivan Gas Turbine Power Station with the capacity of 60 megawatts was reconstructed. On March 14, 2014, the President of the Republic of Azerbaijan signed an Order on financing the construction of Arpachay-2 Hydro Power plant in Nakhchivan Autonomous Republic. In accordance with the decree, 4 million manat was allocated from the fund of the President of Azerbaijan to the Cabinet of Ministers of the Nakhchivan AR with the purpose of completing construction of the Arpachay-2 Hydroelectric Power Plant and the construction of the station was completed. During this period 9 electric substations were created in the autonomous republic and 4 electric substations were reconstructed.

== Fuel supply ==
A protocol was signed in 1992 on the construction of the Khoy-Julfa gas pipeline in order to provide the population with natural gas in the Autonomous Republic. On August 5, 2004, an agreement on the natural gas exchange was signed between Azerigaz CJSC and National Gas Export Company of Iran in order to meet the natural gas supply of Nakhchivan Autonomous Republic. 14 years later, the autonomous republic was provided with the fuel on December 20, 2005.

== Investment ==
In 2013, the volume of investments directed to fixed capital was 1.037 billion manats. During 2004-2013, 227 administrative buildings, 29 pumping stations, 150 subartezian wells, 61 bridges, 119 educational institutions, as well as 83 general educational schools with the capacity of 26164 pupils, 159 cultural institutions, 146 healthcare institutions, 420 individual houses, and 18 sports facilities have been put into operation. Over the past few years, 101 village centers and 3 settlements have been built.

== Industry ==
In 1924-1969, a canning factory and a new silk factory were built in Ordubad, a cotton plant was restored in Sharur district, a new cotton plant was built, and the wine-making enterprise was reconstructed in Nakhchivan. Restoration of technical base of industry was carried out in the autonomous republic at the time of implementation of the tasks of industrialization and the first five-year plan in Azerbaijan. The initial restoration of the industry in the Autonomous Republic were carried out in the fields of salt mining during the years 1924-1926, on silk production during the years 1924-1927, on canning production during the years 1925-1927, on wines during the years 1926-1927.

Oil, cheesemaking, marble, and furniture factories were constructed and put into operation in Nakhchivan in 1933-1937. Construction of Badam mineral Water Bottling Plant also began in this period. For the first time, rural power plants were built in Garabaghlar and Khok villages in the autonomous republic. Compared to 1940, the industrial production in the autonomous republic increased by 44 percent in 1950.

New industrial enterprises were built in Sharur, Shahbuz and Julfa districts along with the cities of Nakhchivan and Ordubad. In 1951-1955, the electricity network in Sharur district, Paragachay in Ordubad, Gumushlu mining industrial enterprises in Sharur region, baked goods factory in Nakhchivan, meat factory and Badamli mineral water filling plant in Shahbuz region were built and put into operation. As a result, new industries including mineral water, meat, dairy, baked goods and non-ferrous metal production industries were formed, and industrial production increased by 87 percent in 1951-1955.

The electro-technical plant, construction industry enterprises, tobacco fermentation and Sirab mineral water plant built in 1956-1965 played an important role in the development of economy of the autonomous republic. Along with these, the construction of the plant manufacturing precast concrete products in Nakhchivan and the re-construction of the Nakhchivan salt mine began. In 1965, Nakhchivan started to supply with power from the Mingachevir Hydropower Station. Production of Raw Silk was up to 40 tonnes in the same period. The volume of industrial production was gradually decreasing during 1956-1959, it was 91 per cent in 1958 and 99.2 per cent in 1959. Generally, the volume of industrial production increased by only 6% in 1956-1960 and by 8% in 1961-1965.

Nakhchivan Automobile Plant (Azerbaijani: Naxçıvan Avtomobil Zavodu), better known as NAZ, is an automobile manufacturer in the Nakhchivan Autonomous Republic of Azerbaijan.

== See also ==
- Economy of Azerbaijan
- Nakhchivan Automobile Plant
