= Lifan 820 =

Chinese mid-size sedan

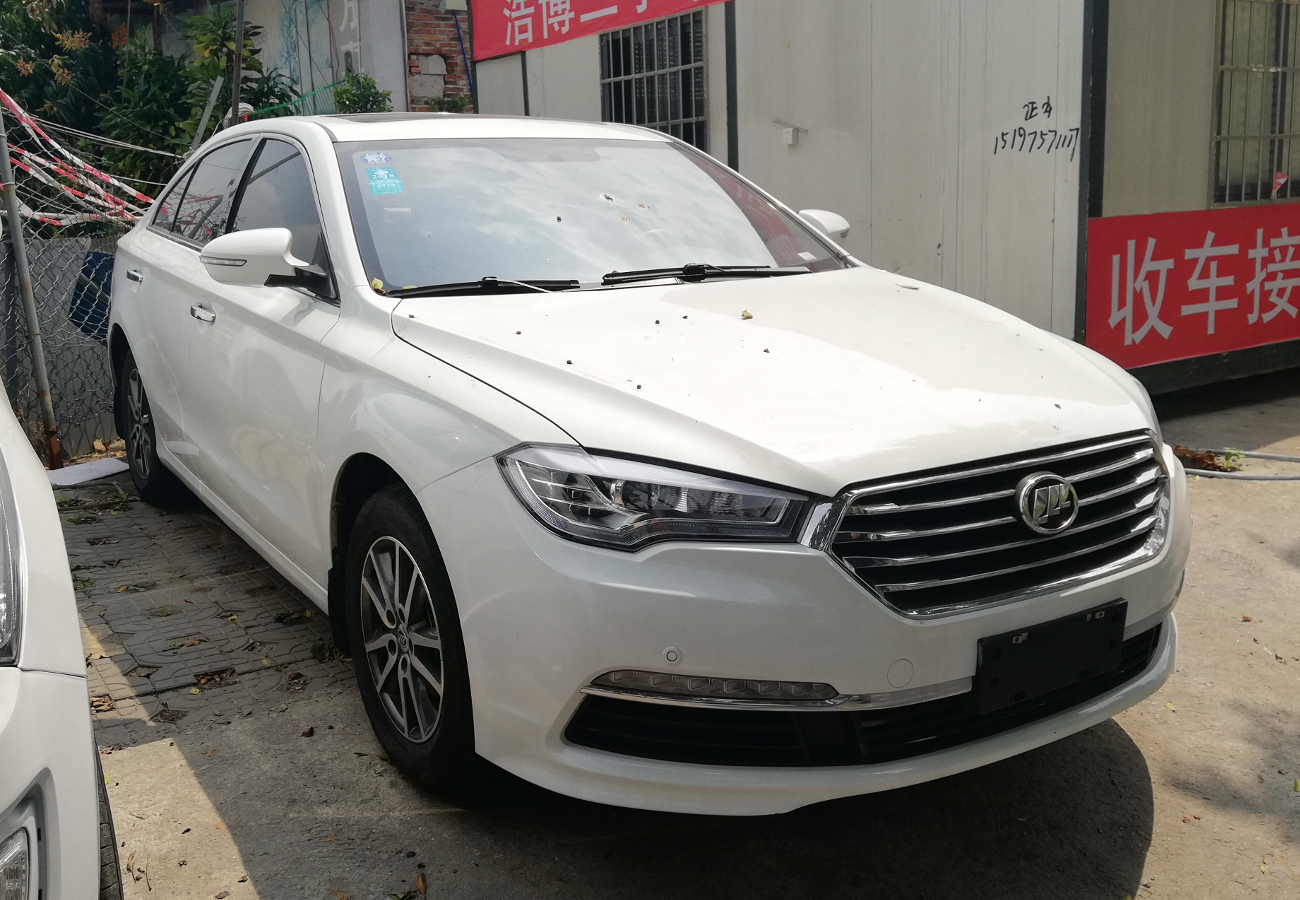

Overview
- Manufacturer: Lifan
- Also called: Lifan Murman (Russia); Kantanka Mensah (Ghana)
- Production: 2015–2020
- Assembly: China: Chongqing; Azerbaijan: Nakhchivan (NAZ); Iran: Kerman (KMC)

Body and chassis
- Class: Mid-size car
- Body style: 4-door saloon

Powertrain
- Engine: 1.8 L I4 petrol engine 2.4 L I4 petrol engine
- Transmission: 6-speed automatic

Dimensions
- Wheelbase: 2,775 mm (109.3 in)
- Length: 4,865 mm (191.5 in)
- Width: 1,835 mm (72.2 in)
- Height: 1,480 mm (58.3 in)

The Lifan 820 is a four-door mid-size sedan produced by the Lifan Motors division of Lifan Group.

== Overview ==
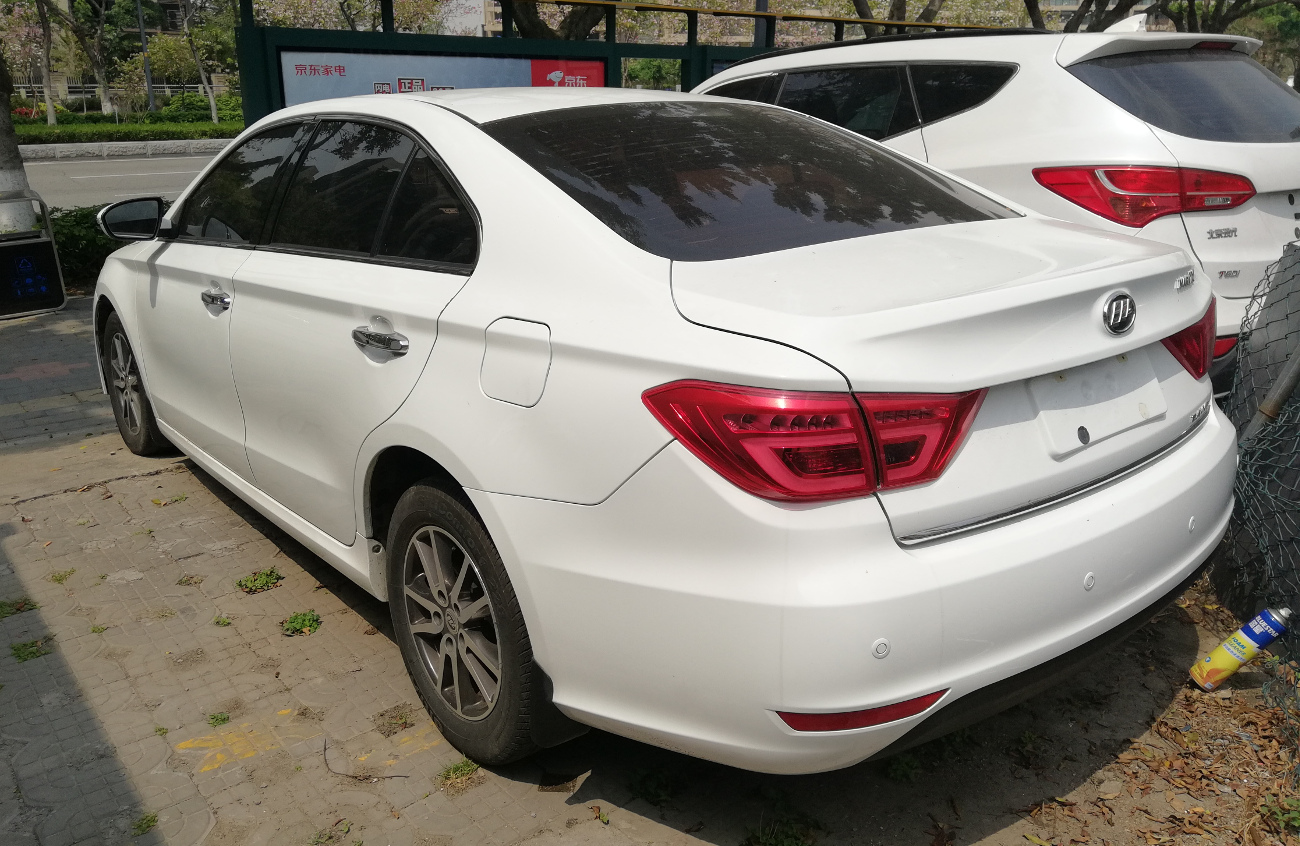
Lifan 820 rear

Launched in 2014 at the Beijing Auto Show, the Lifan 820 was available to the Chinese market in 2015 with a price range of 81,800 yuan to 119,800 yuan, and was later adjusted to 76,800 yuan to 119,800 yuan as of 2019.

=== Powertrain ===
Engine options for the 820 includes a 4-cylinder engines 1.8 L engine producing 99 kW (133 hp) with a torque of 168 N⋅m (124 lb⋅ft), and a 4-cylinder engines 2.4 L engine producing 125 kW (167 hp) with a torque of 226 N⋅m (167 lb⋅ft).

== Lifan 820EV ==
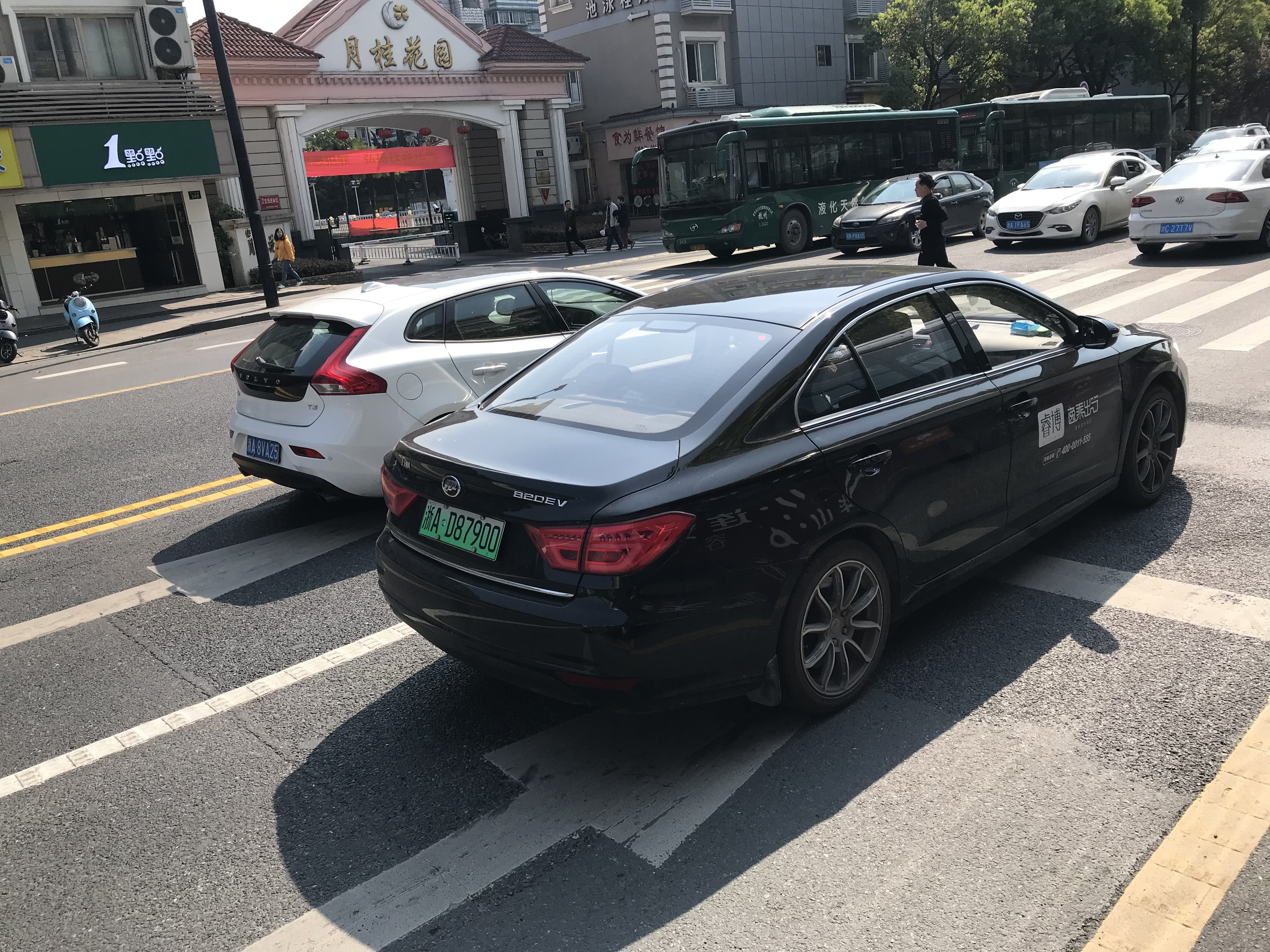
Lifan 820EV rear

Revealed during the 2015 Shanghai Auto Show, the Lifan 820EV is the electric version of the Lifan 820 mid-size sedan. The Lifan 820EV is powered by a 142 kW (190 hp) electric motor with a torque of 440 N⋅m (325 lb⋅ft). According to official numbers by Lifan, top speed of the 820EV is 150 km/h (93 mph) and the maximum range is 400 km (249 mi).
