= Lifan 620 =

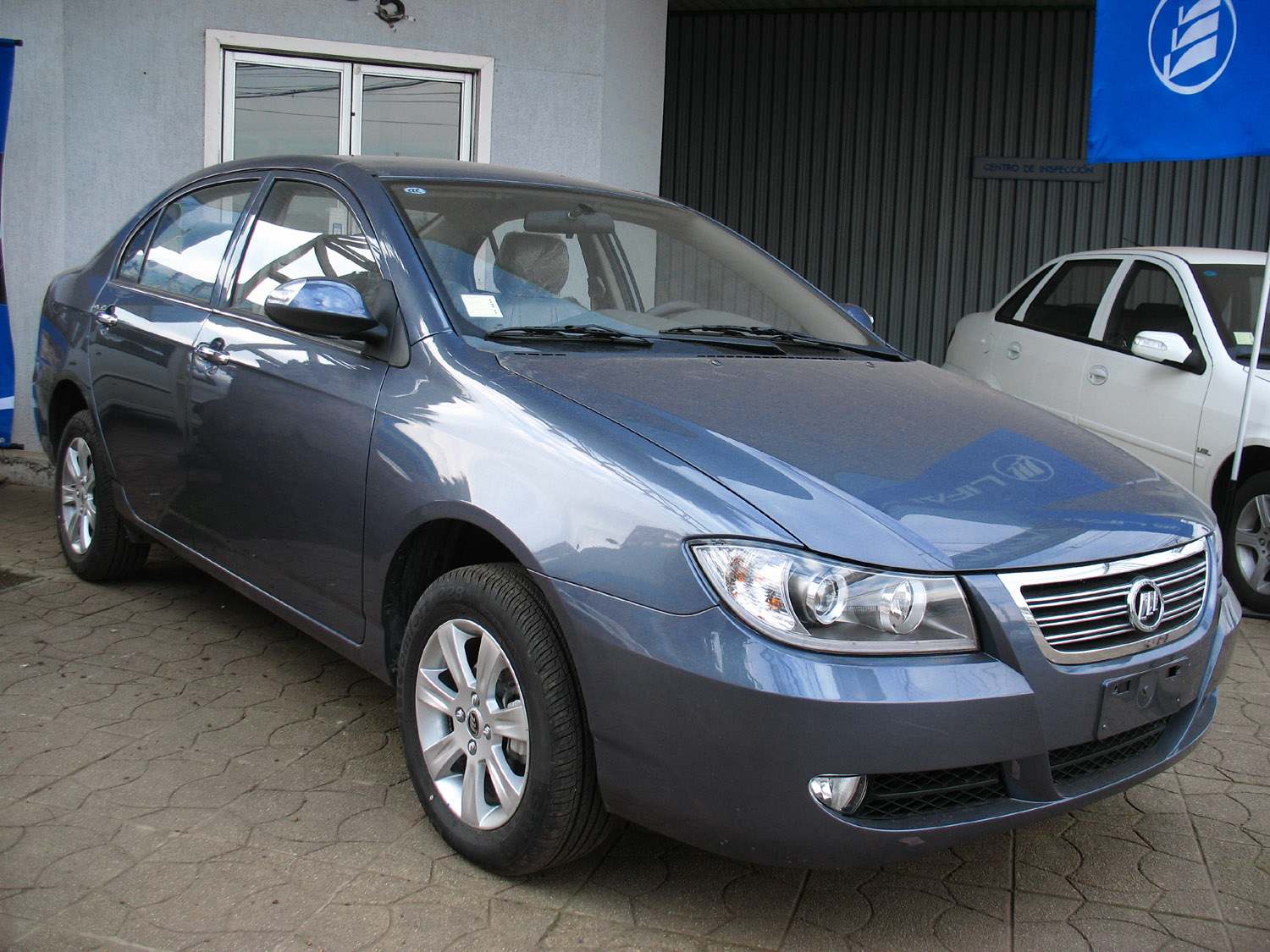

Overview
- Manufacturer: Lifan
- Also called: Lifan Solano (Russia); Martin Motors MM620 (Europe)
- Production: 2008–2018
- Assembly: China: Chongqing; Russia: Cherkessk (Derways); Azerbaijan: Nakhchivan (NAZ); Tunisia: Tunis; Uruguay: San José; Iran: Kerman (KMC)

Body and chassis
- Class: Compact car
- Body style: 4-door saloon

Powertrain
- Engine: 1.5 L LF479Q2 I4; 1.6 L LF481Q3 I4
- Transmission: 5-speed manual CVT

Dimensions
- Wheelbase: 2,605 mm (102.6 in)
- Length: 4,550 mm (179.1 in)
- Width: 1,705 mm (67.1 in)
- Height: 1,495 mm (58.9 in)

The Lifan 620 is a four-door compact sedan produced by the Lifan Motors division of Lifan Group. The model spawned a few facelift variants in the years after its launch, with the 630 launched in 2014 and the 650 launched in 2016.

== Overview ==
Launched in 2009, the styling of the compact sedan is said to resemble the BMW 3-series without the kidney grilles especially from the front.

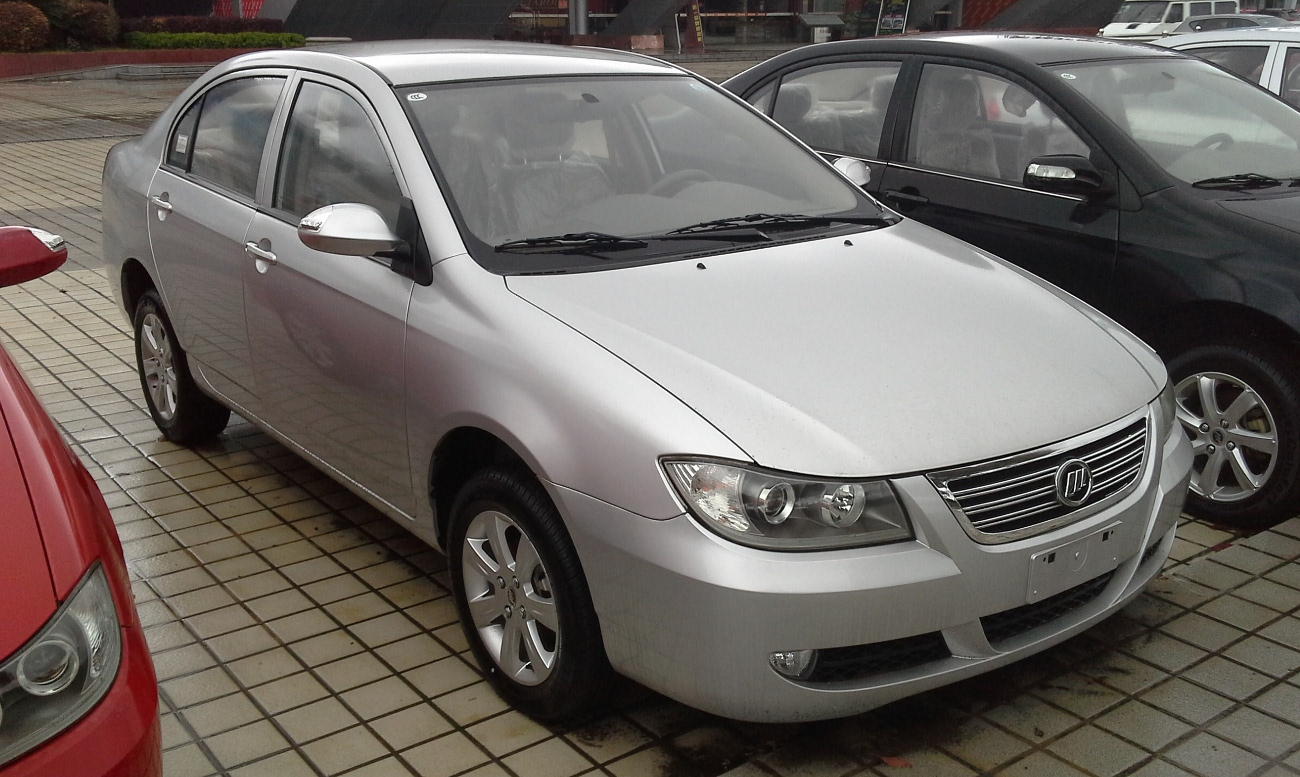
Lifan 620 (front)

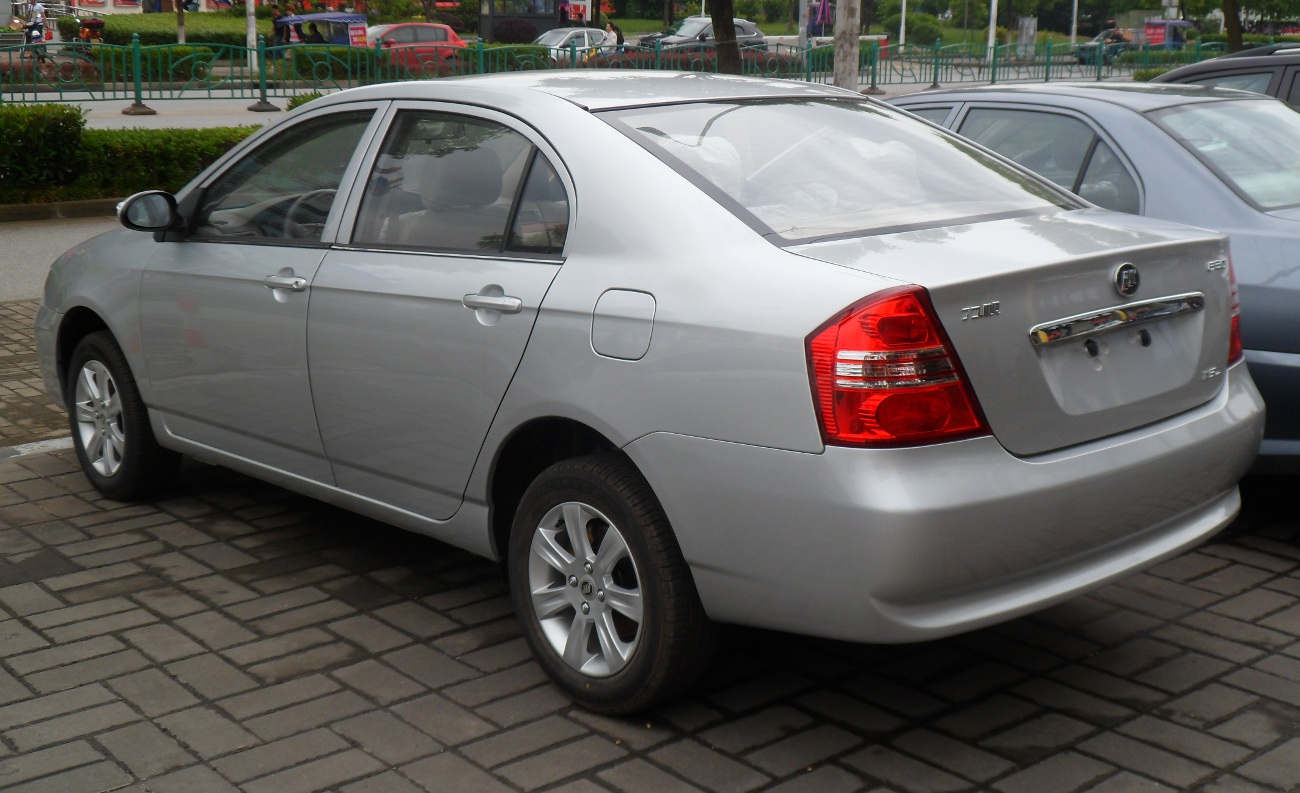
Lifan 620 (rear)

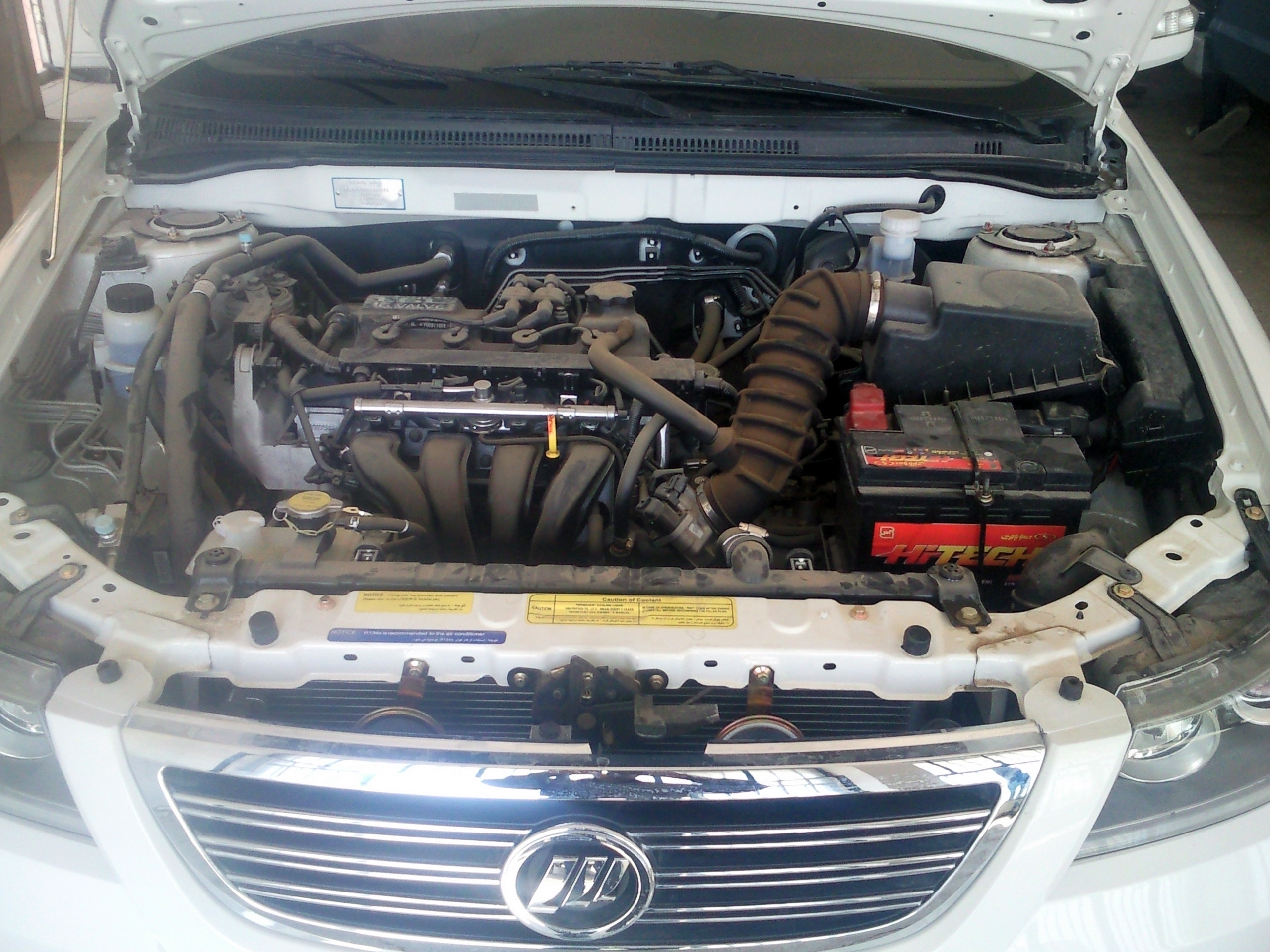
Lifan 620 engine

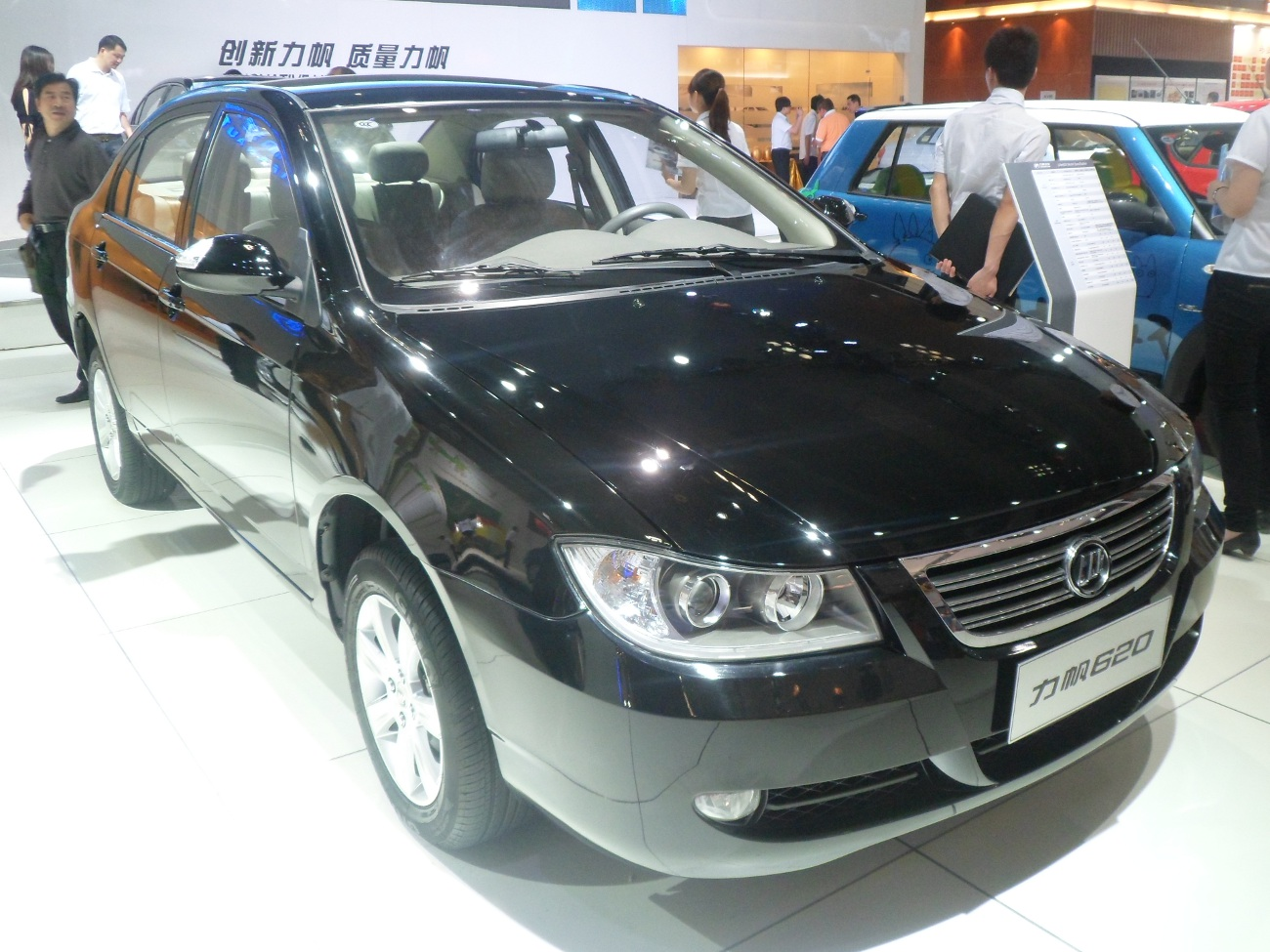
Lifan 620 in Chongqing

== Powertrain ==
The Lifan 620 is powered by a 4-cylinder engines 1.6 L (1587cc) Tritec engine producing 85 kW (116 PS; 114 bhp) or 87 kW (116 hp).

== Markets ==
The Lifan 620 is sold in China in and several export markets including Vietnam. In Russia, where it is assembled by Derways, it is known as the Lifan Solano. In a Tunisian plant the model is assembled since 2012 by Martin Motors as the Martin Motors MM620 for the European markets.

== Production in Iran ==
A modified version of Lifan 620 sporting Lifan X60's 1.8 L I4 engine was assembled in Iran by Kerman Motor.

== Lifan 630 ==
For the 2014 model year, a restyled version called the Lifan 630 was available. Prices of the 630 ranges from 54,900 yuan to 72,900 yuan with an electric version also available.

The 630 is available with a 1.5-litre engine codenamed LF479Q2 producing 70 kW (94 hp) and 128 N⋅m (94 lb⋅ft) and a 1.5-litre VVT engine codenamed LF479Q2-B producing 77 kW (103 hp) and 133 N⋅m (98 lb⋅ft). Both engines are mated to a 5-speed manual transmission.

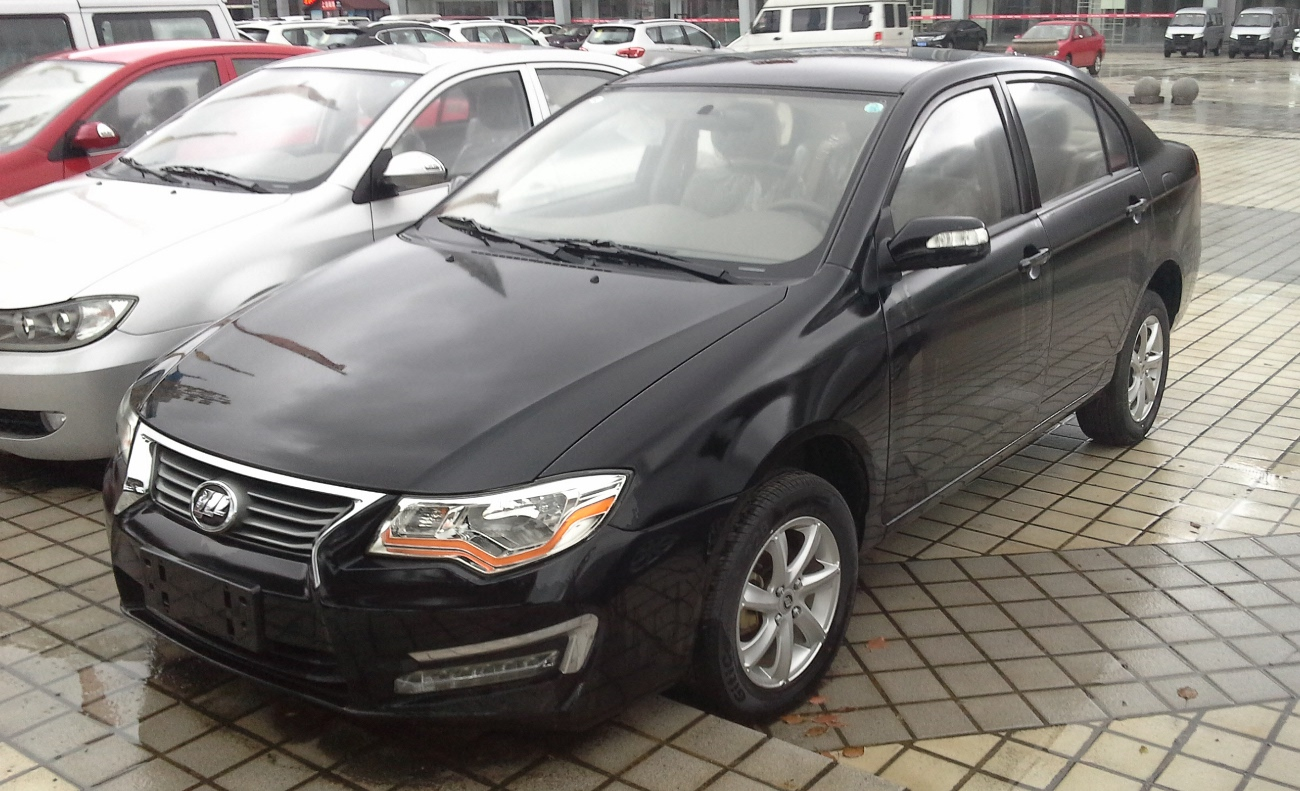
Lifan 630 (front)

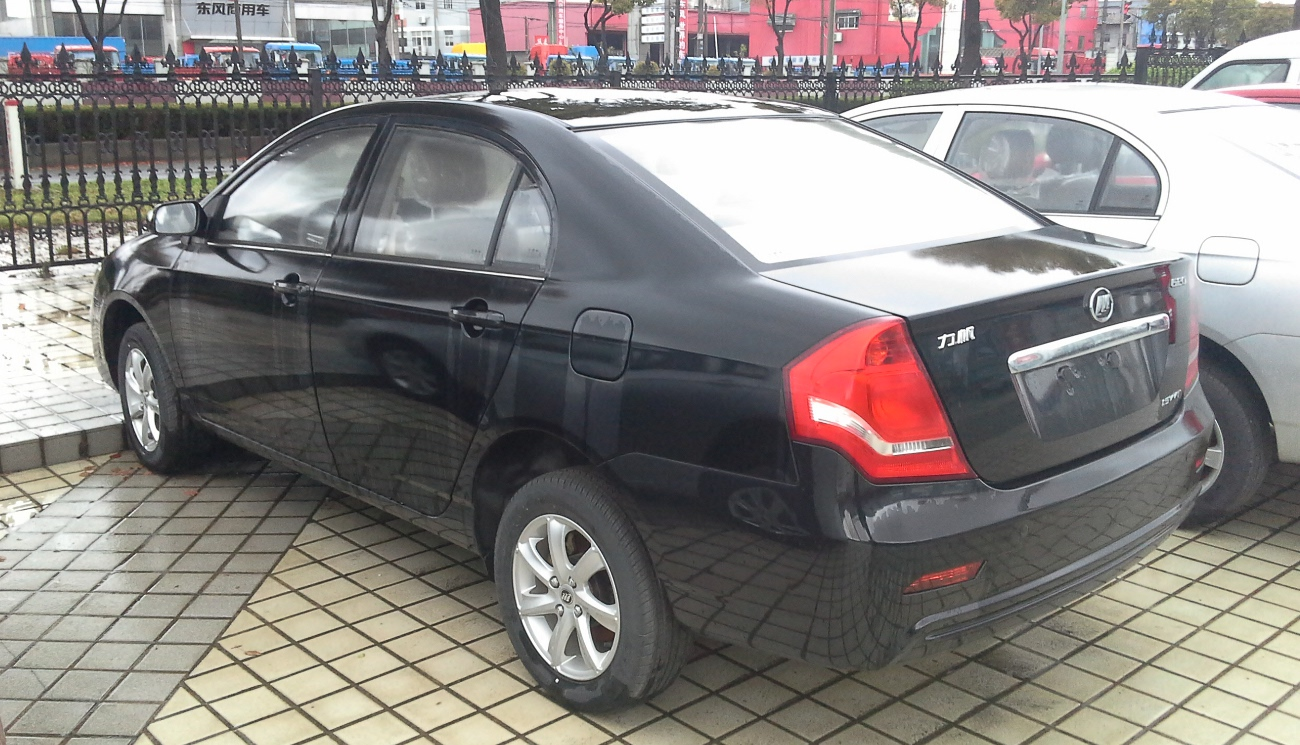
Lifan 630 (rear)

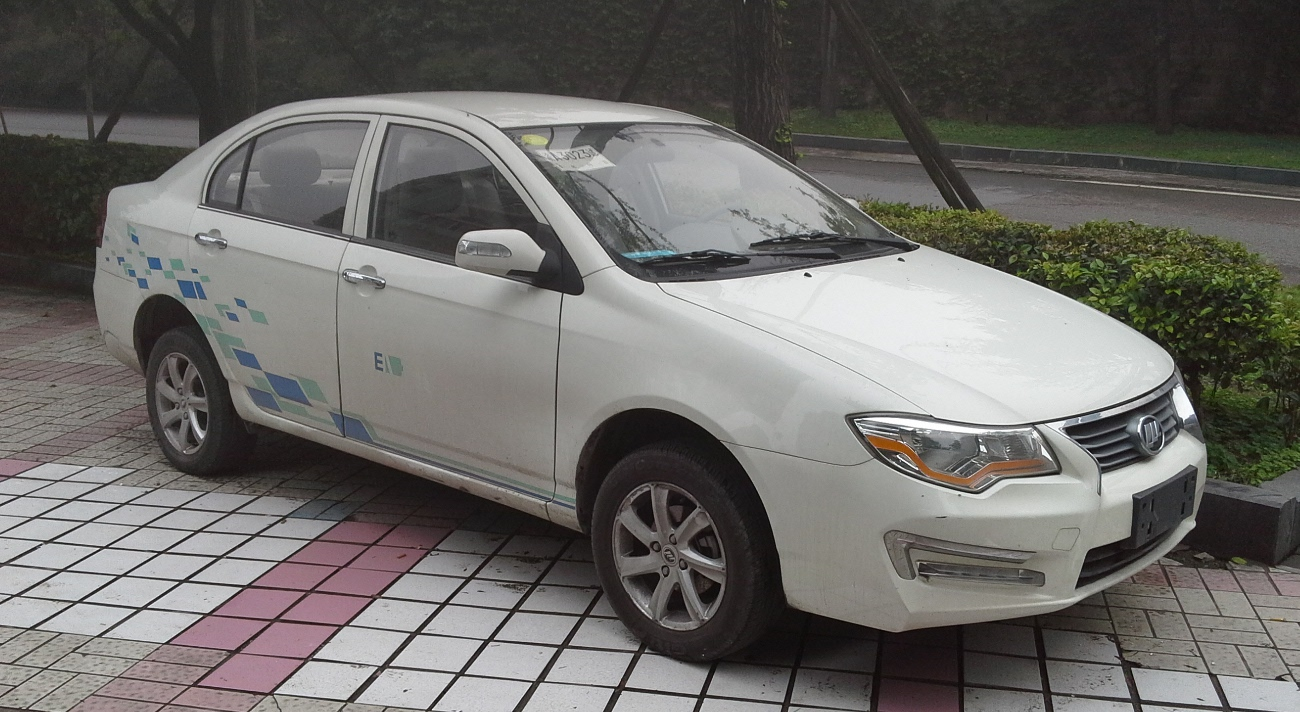
Lifan 630 EV (front)

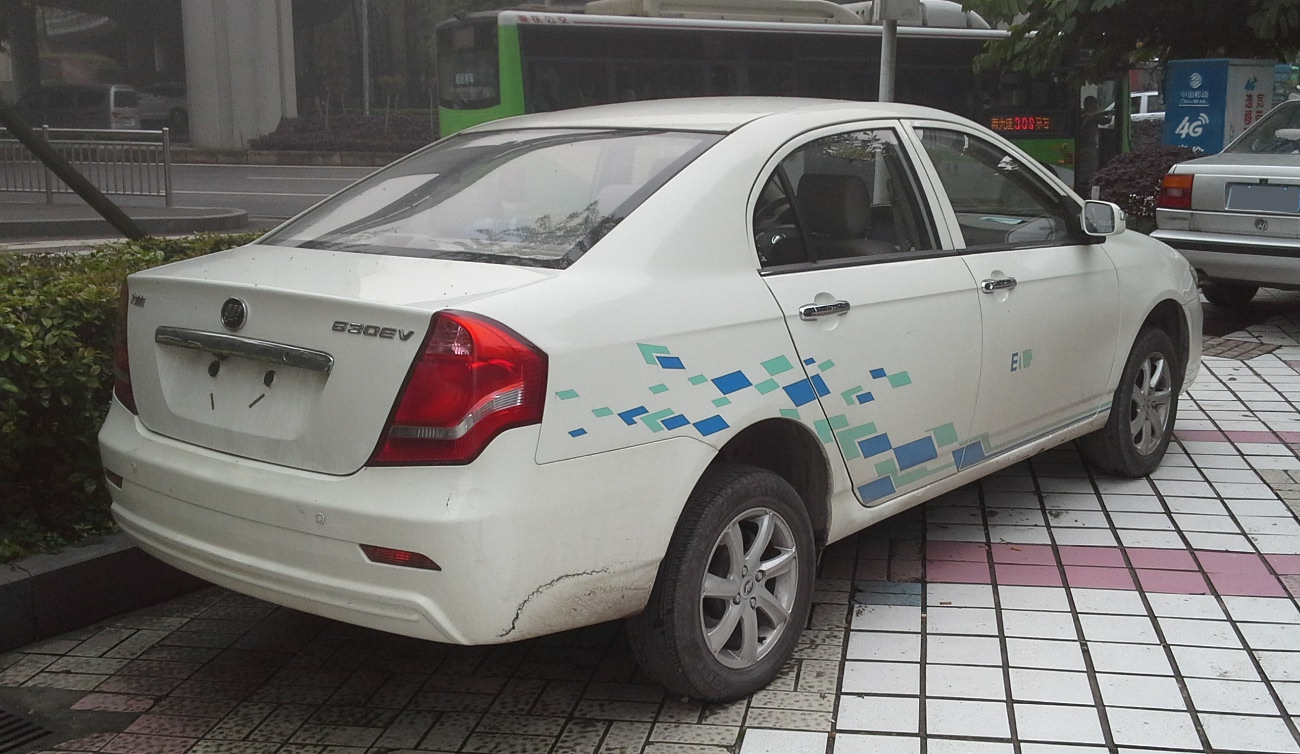
Lifan 630 EV (rear)

== Lifan 650 ==
The Lifan 650 is a four-door compact sedan that is essentially a restyled Lifan 620, with a completely redesigned front and rear DRG. It is the replacement for the 620 and 630 sedans.

Launched during the 2016 Beijing Auto Show, Lifan 650 was priced between 55,800 yuan to 65,800 yuan. the 650 sedan is powered by a 4-cylinder engines 1.5 L engine producing 103 kW (140 PS; 138 bhp).

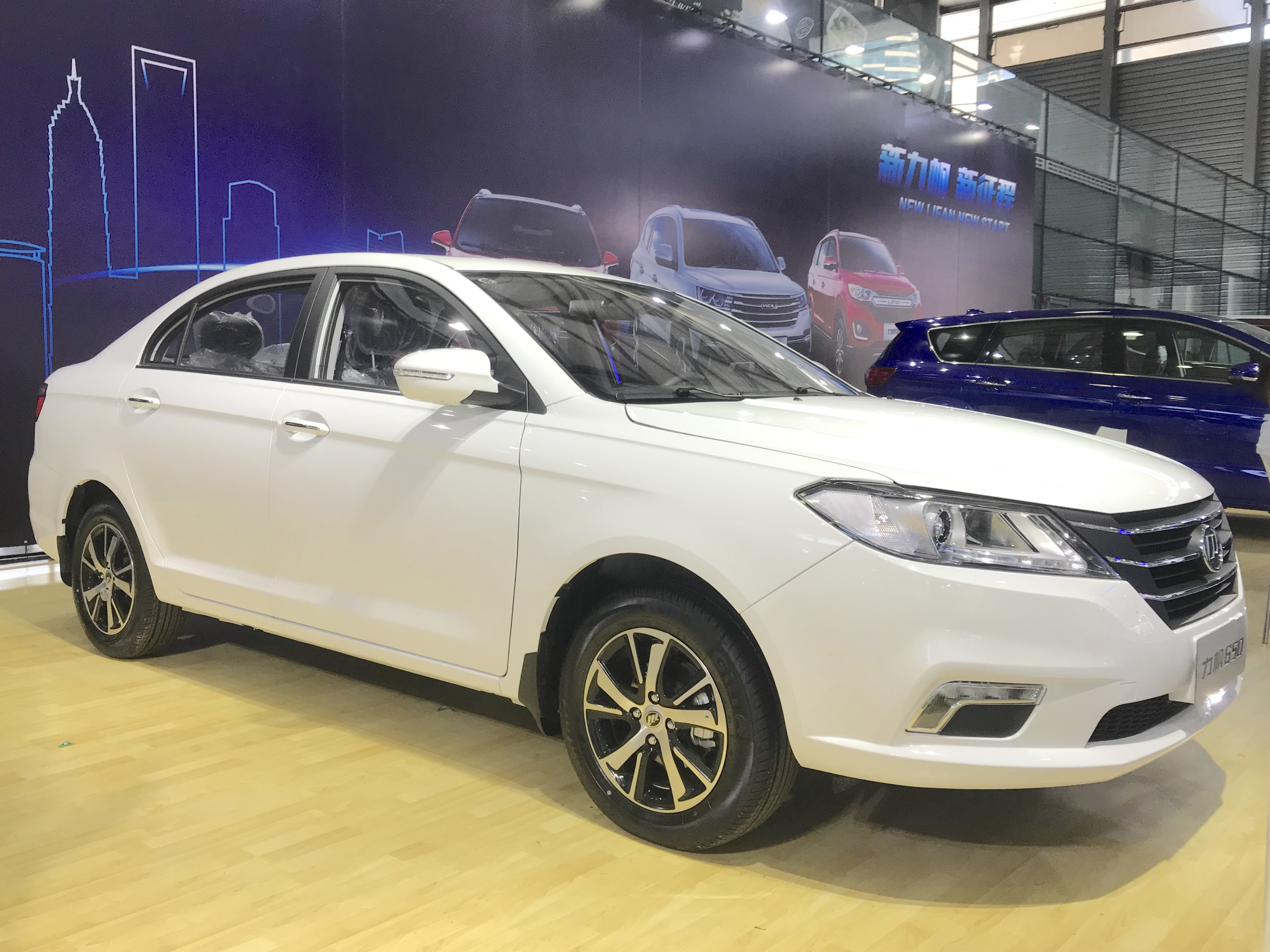
Lifan 650 (front)

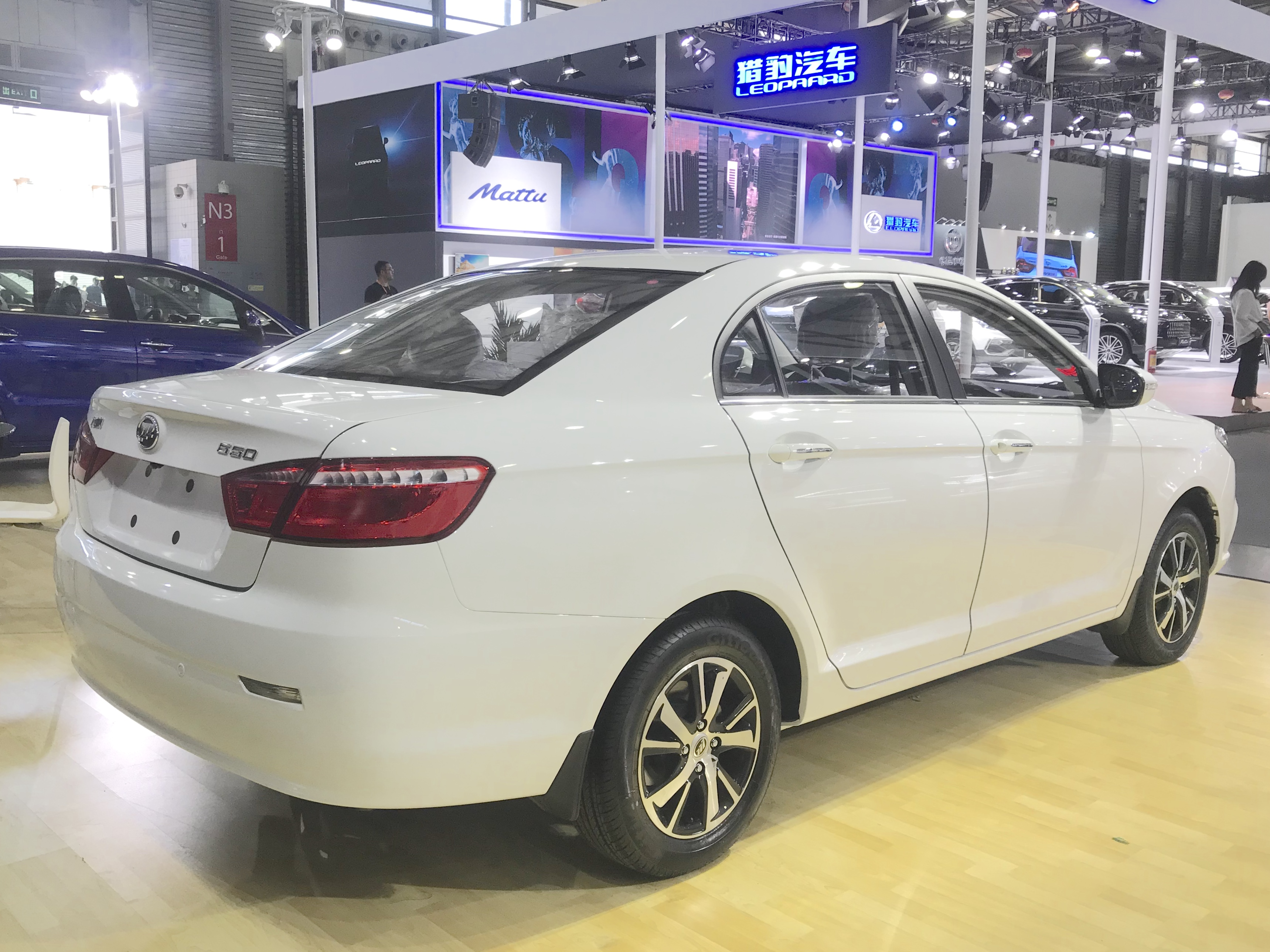
Lifan 650 (rear)

== ChangJiang 360e ==
The ChangJiang 360e is an electric compact sedan made in 2016 based on the Lifan 650. It uses a 100 kW (134 hp) motor. The 360e has 4 doors and 4 seats. Its dimensions are 4625 mm/1715 mm/1510 mm, and has a kerb weight of 1,850 kg.
