= Nakhchivan Automobile Plant =

Automobile manufacturer in Azerbaijan

- Native name: Naxçıvan Avtomobil Zavodu
- Type: Private company
- Industry: Automotive
- Founded: 2006; 20 years ago
- Headquarters: Nakhchivan, Azerbaijan
- Products: Automobiles, motorcycles
- Parent: Cahan Holding
- Website: cahan.az

Nakhchivan Automobile Plant (Azerbaijani: Naxçıvan Avtomobil Zavodu), also known as NAZ, is an automobile manufacturer in the Nakhchivan Autonomous Republic of Azerbaijan.

== History ==
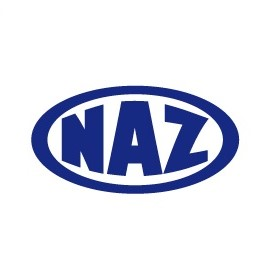
Naz logo from 2010 to 2021

Nakhchivan Automobile Factory was founded in 2006. It began operation on January 11, 2010. Baku 2015 European Games signed NAZ as Official Supporter. Since April 2019, NAZ became part of Cahan Holding.

In the first stage 108 passenger cars of 4 different Lifan Group models were assembled and sold as NAZ-LIFAN brand. These are NAZ-LIFAN 620 (sedan), NAZ-LIFAN 520 (sedan), NAZ-LIFAN 520i (hatchback) and NAZ-LIFAN 320 (hatchback) models.

In 2012, the factory began production of the new SUV-type crossover NAZ-LIFAN X60. At the end of 2012 for marketing purposes, a small batch of commercial vehicles were assembled and put in showrooms.

At the end of 2013 year factory started the production of the new NAZ-LIFAN 720 model, NAZ-LIFAN 630 and 330 models.

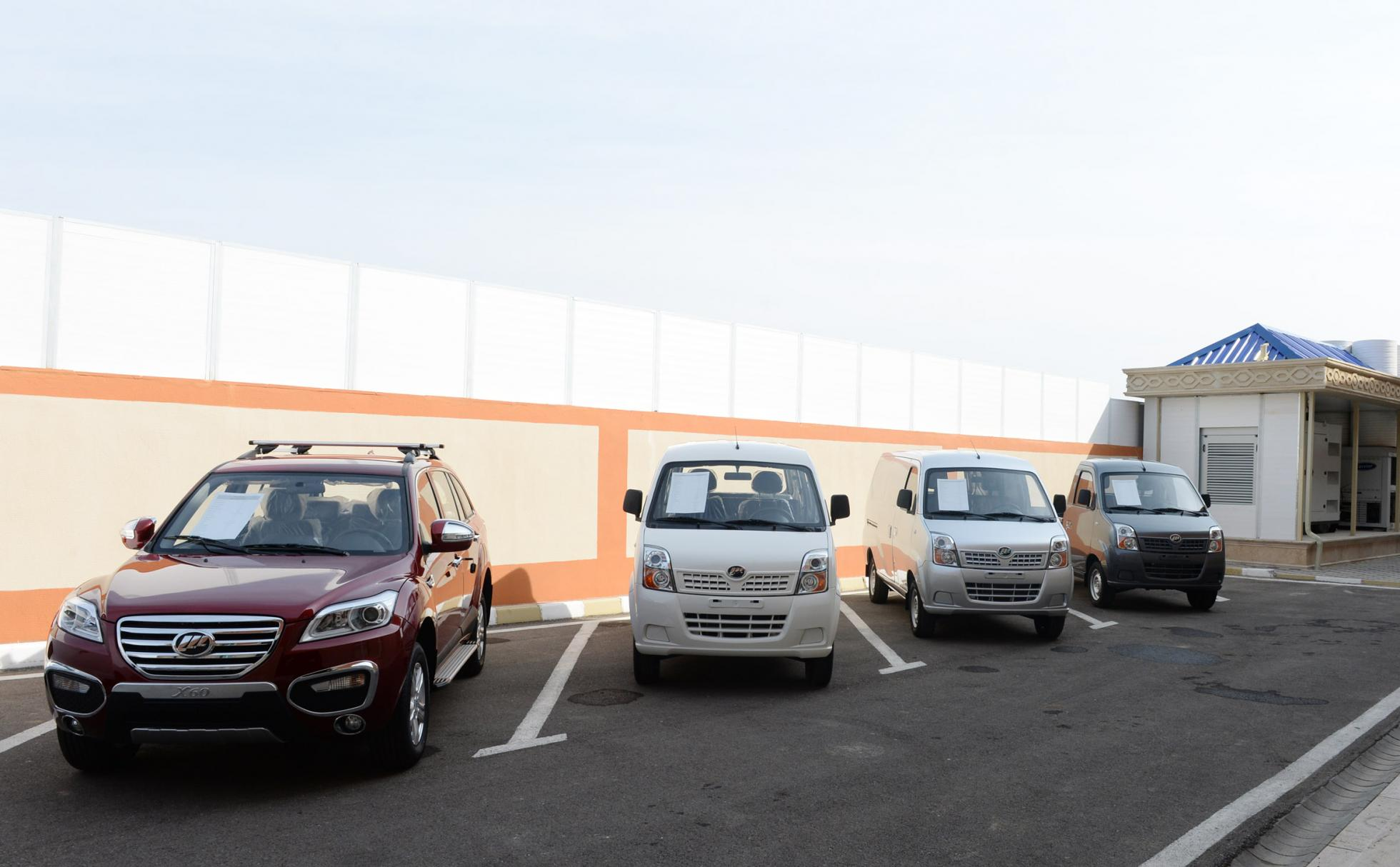
Nazlifan vehicles in 2014

== Facilities ==
The factory covers 2.6 ha (6.4 acres). It includes a vehicle assembly line and multiple compenent stations, all working simultaneously.

== Production ==
Annual output of the factory is 5000 cars. NAZ-LIFAN 620 models are equipped with an automatic transmission.

The LF5028 model cargo-van and LF1022 model light duty truck has 800 kg (1,800 lb) carrying capacity. The LF6401 model minibus offers 1+6 seated.

== Models ==
- Lifan 320
- Lifan 7130
- Lifan 7160
- Lifan 7161 A
- Lifan 7160 L1
- Lifan 7162
- Lifan 7162 C
- Lifan 650
- Lifan X60
- Lifan Foison
- Lifan 820 Premium
- Lifan X70
- Lifan L7
- FAW T80
- FAW T33
- Changan Minivan
- Changan Pickup
- Maple X3 PRO (2023-)

== Gallery ==
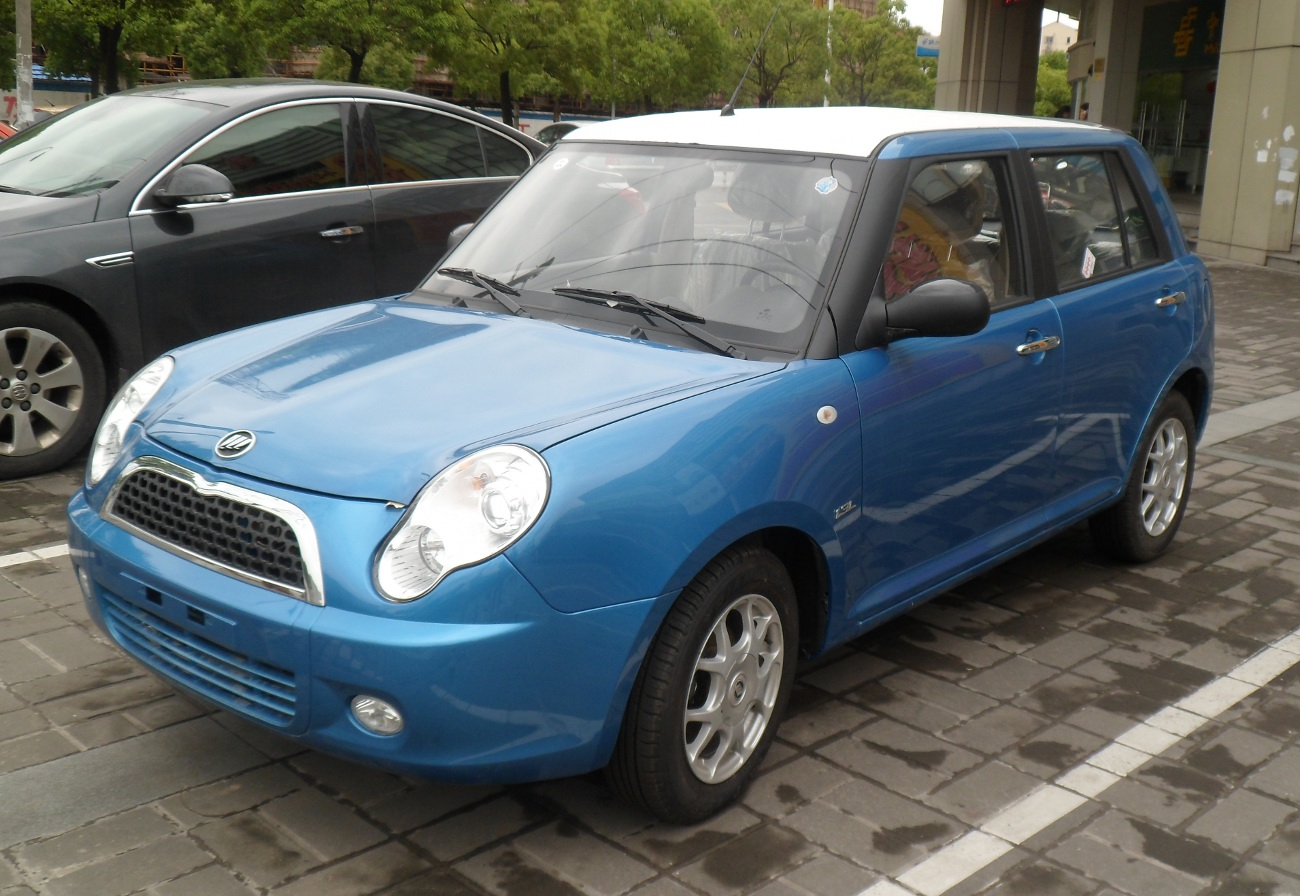
Lifan 320

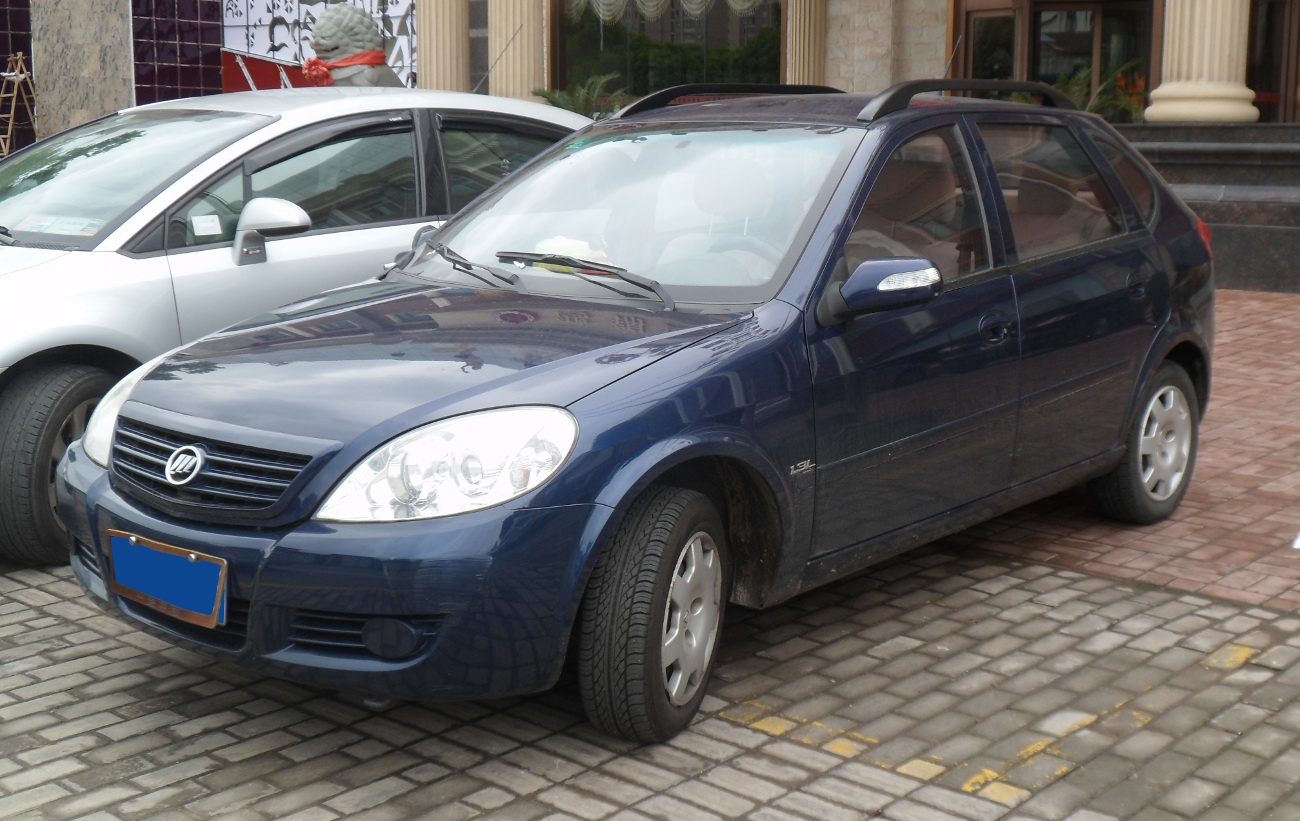
Lifan 520i

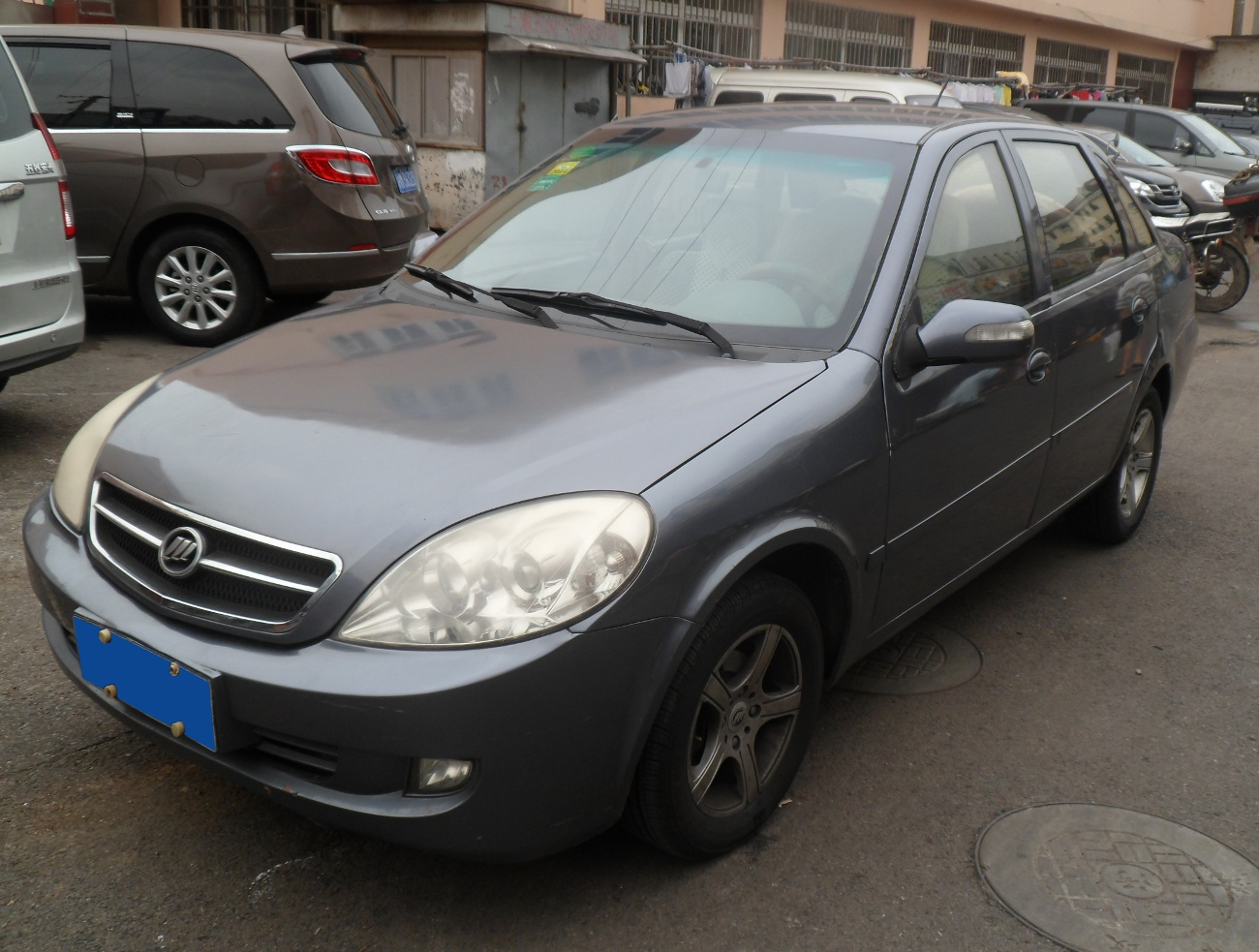
Lifan 520

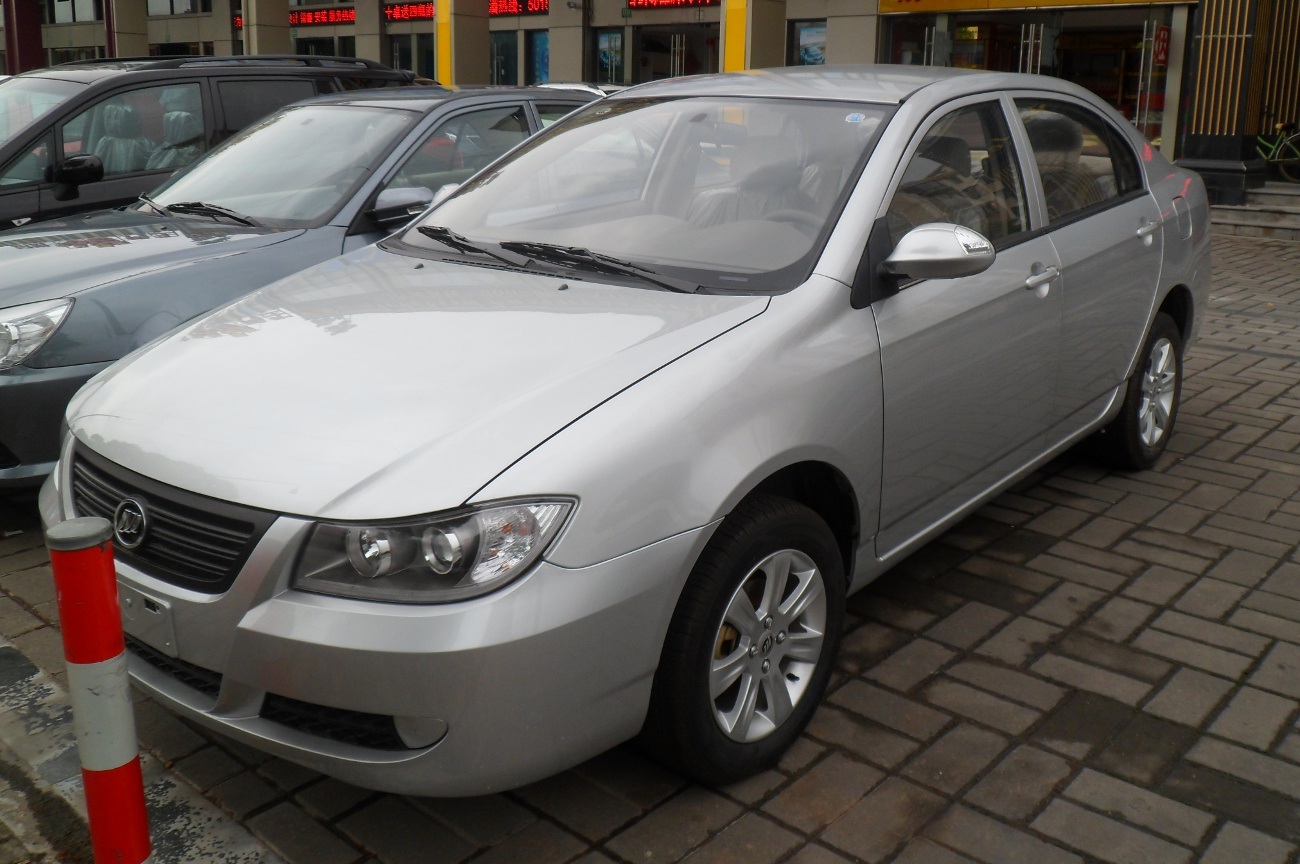
Lifan 620

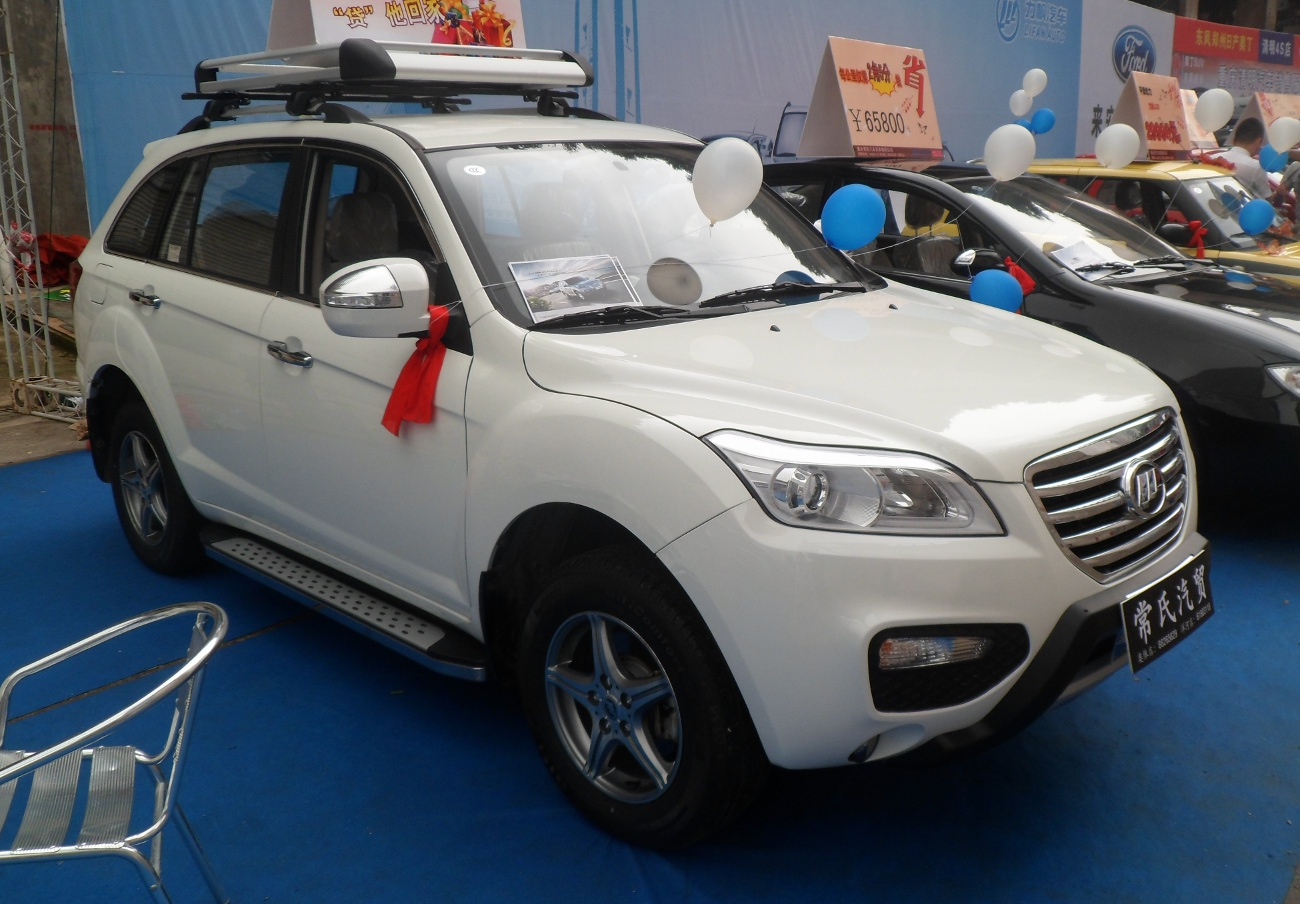
Lifan X60

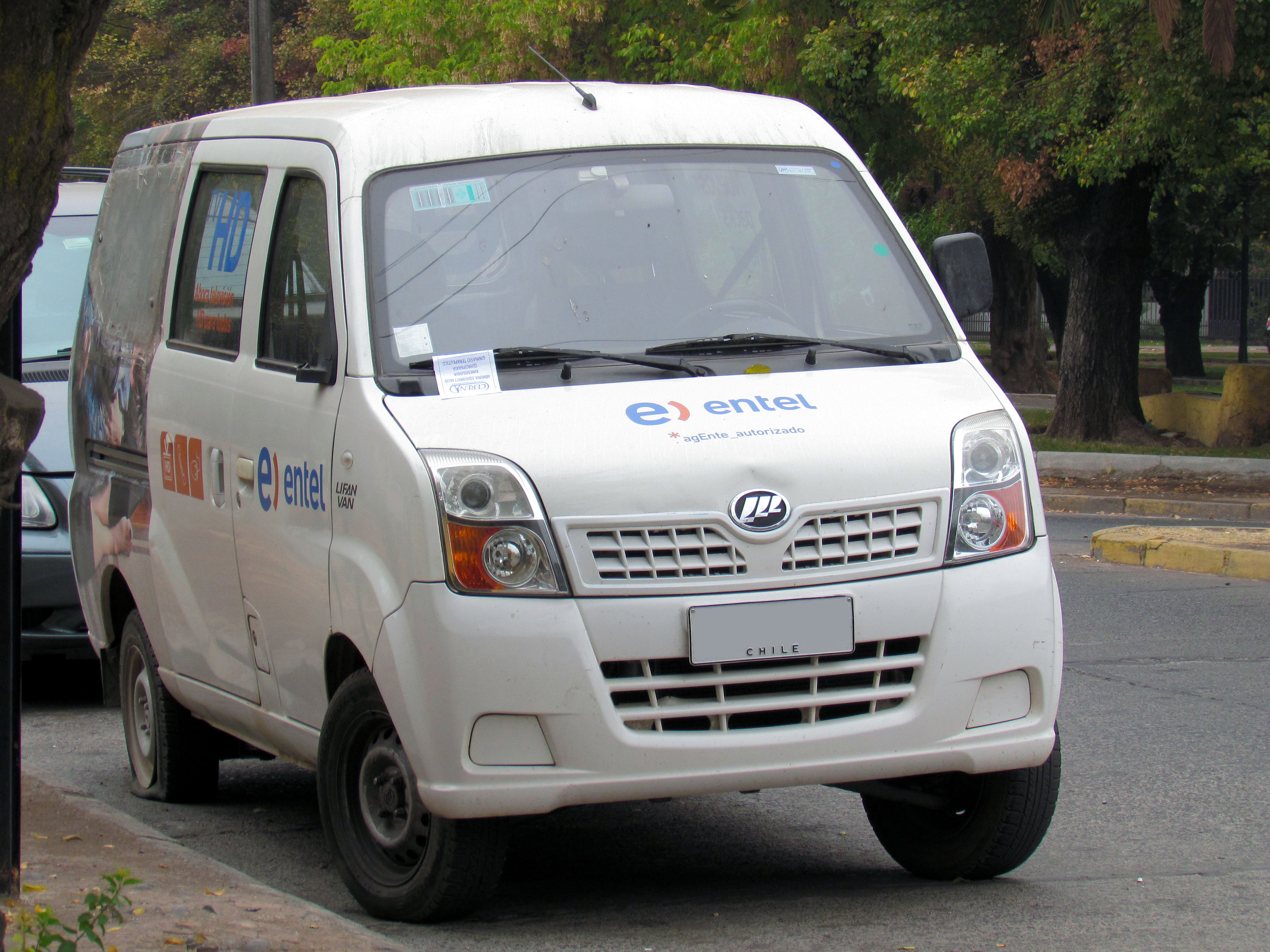
Lifan Foison

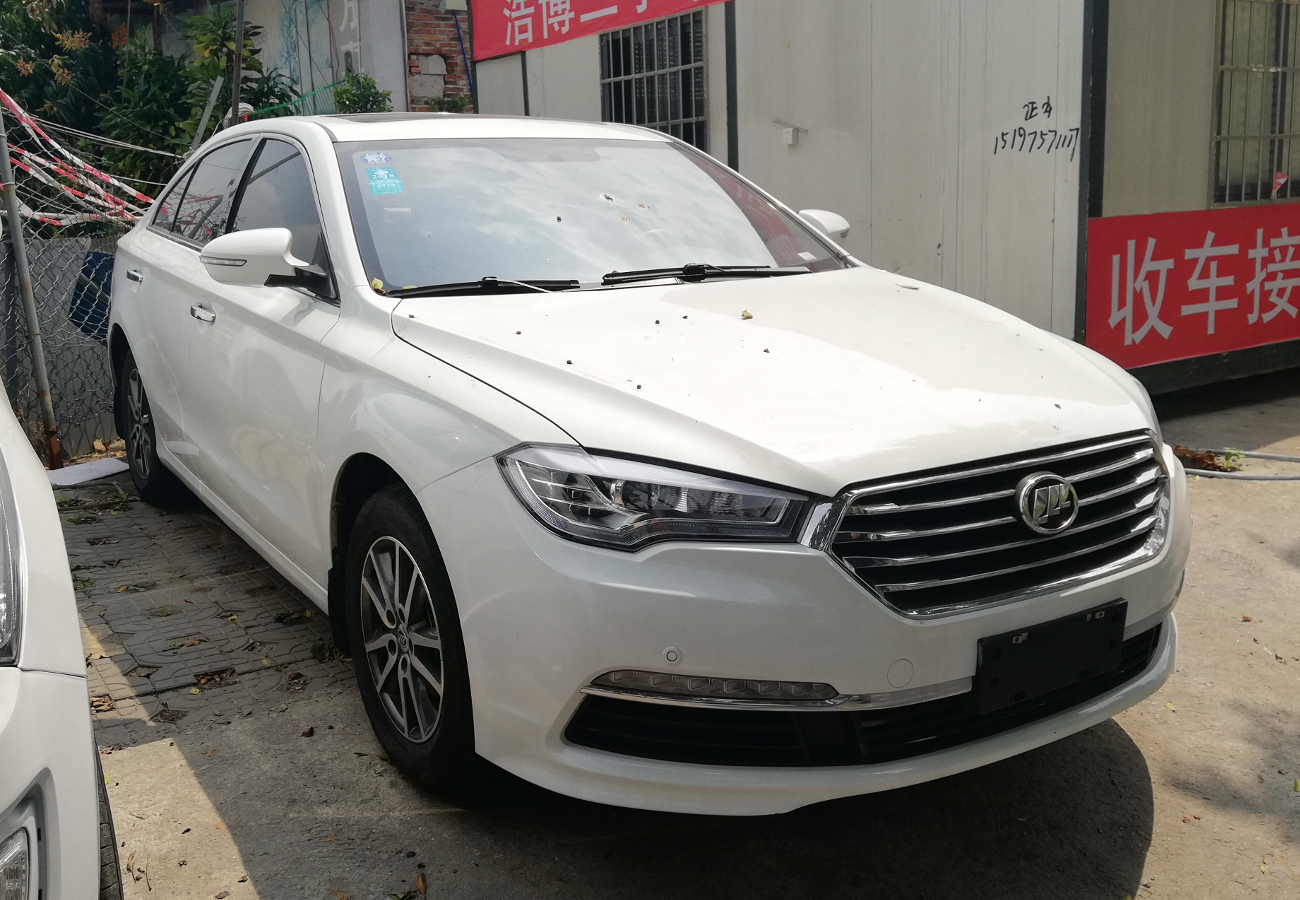
Lifan 820

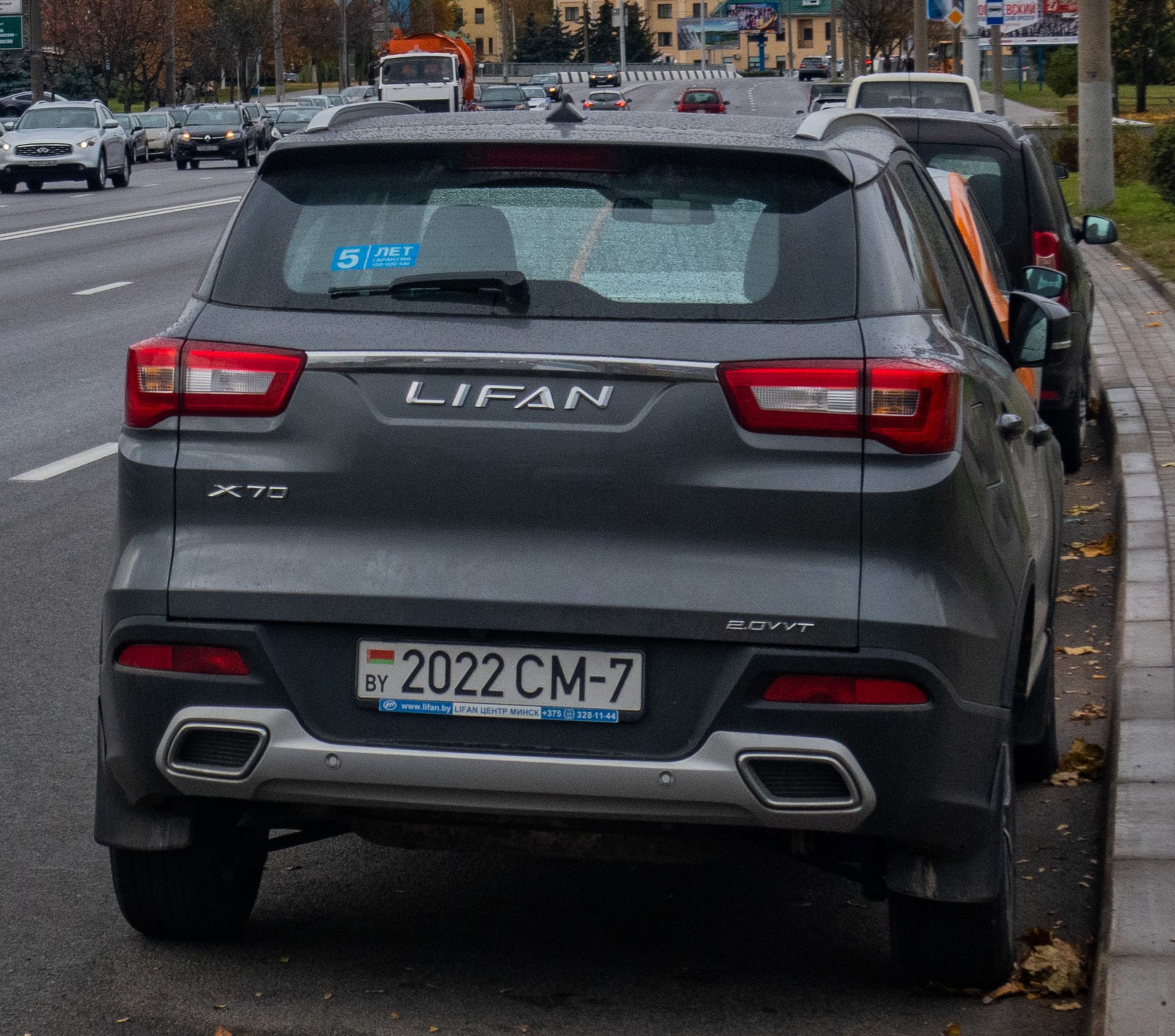
Lifan L7

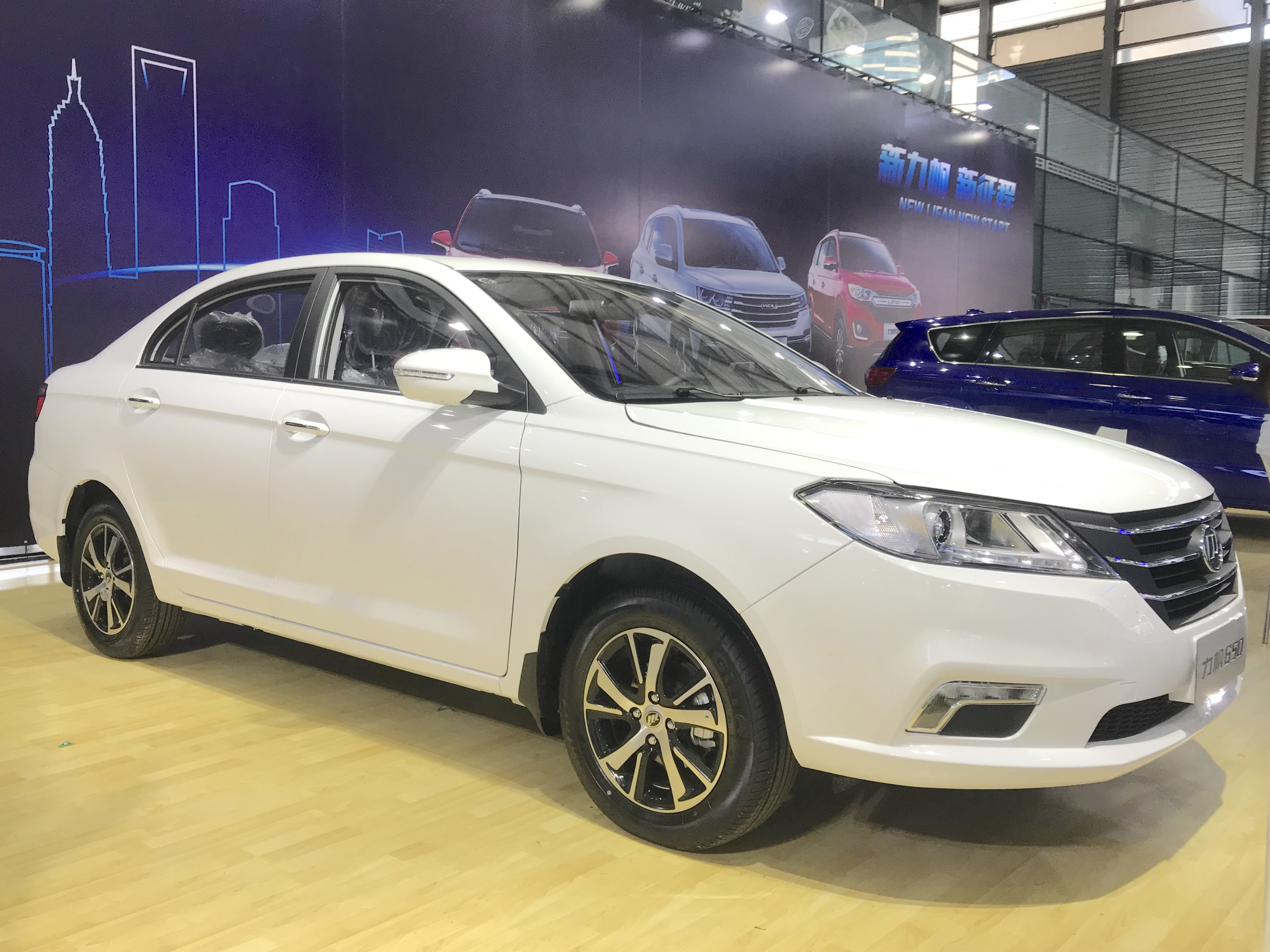
Lifan 650

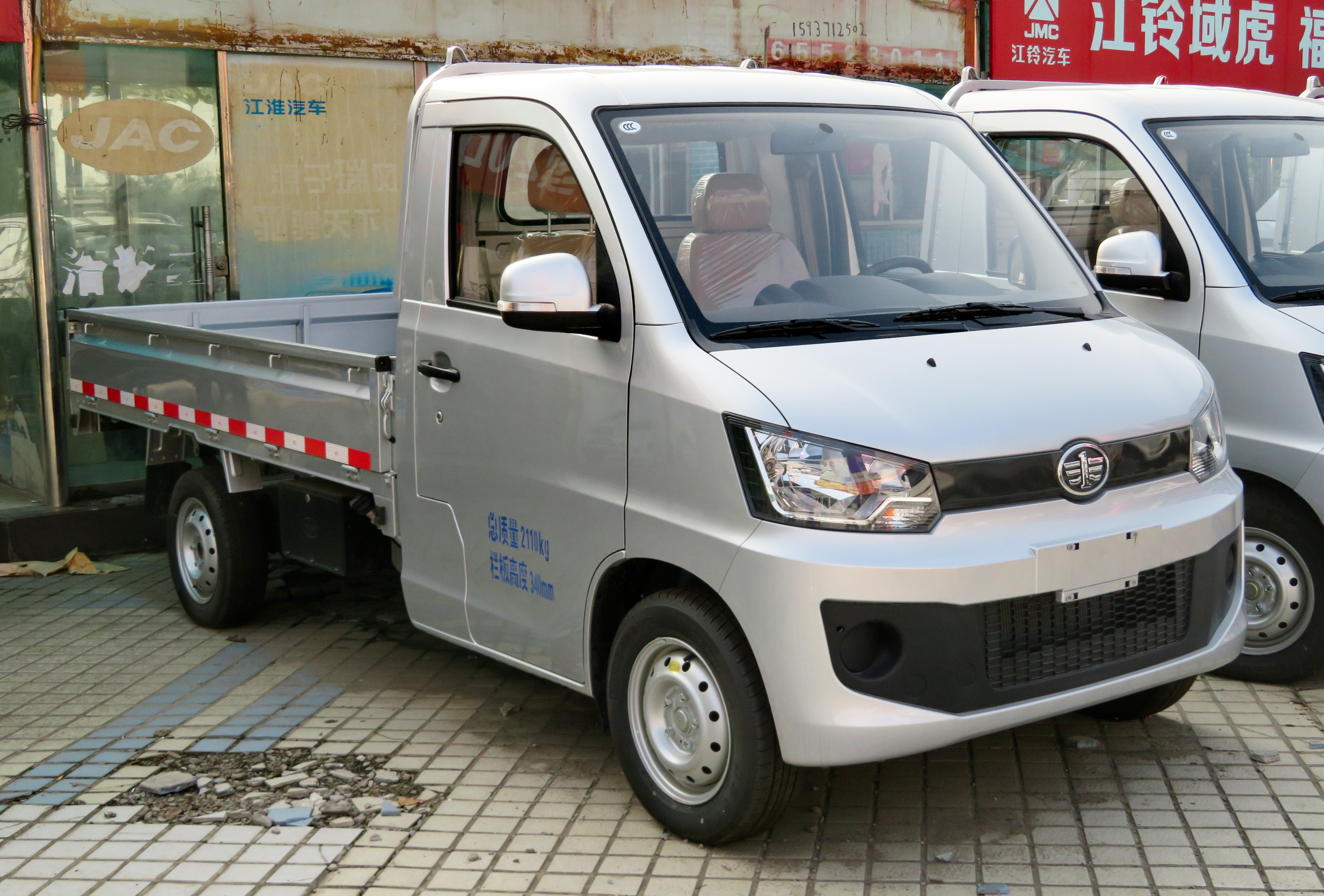
FAW T80

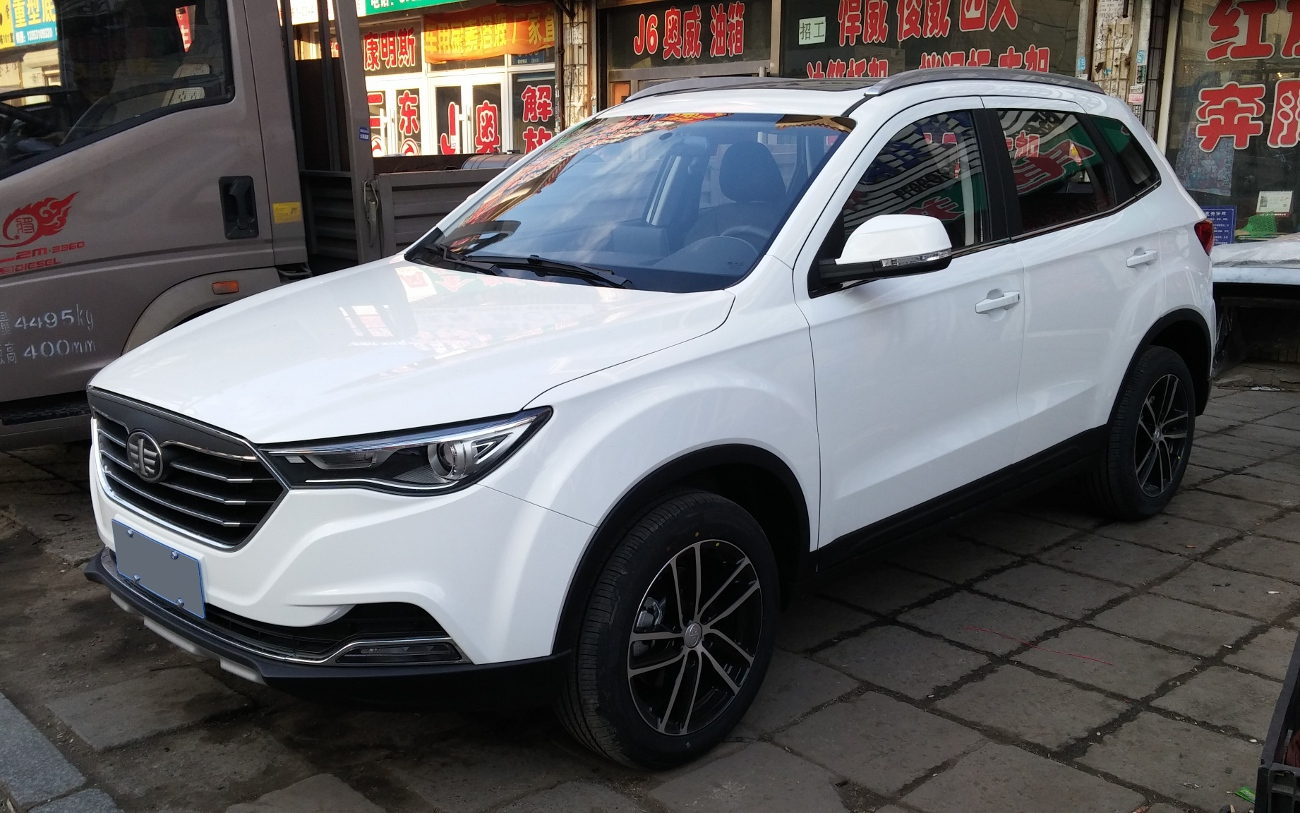
FAW Besturn T33/X40

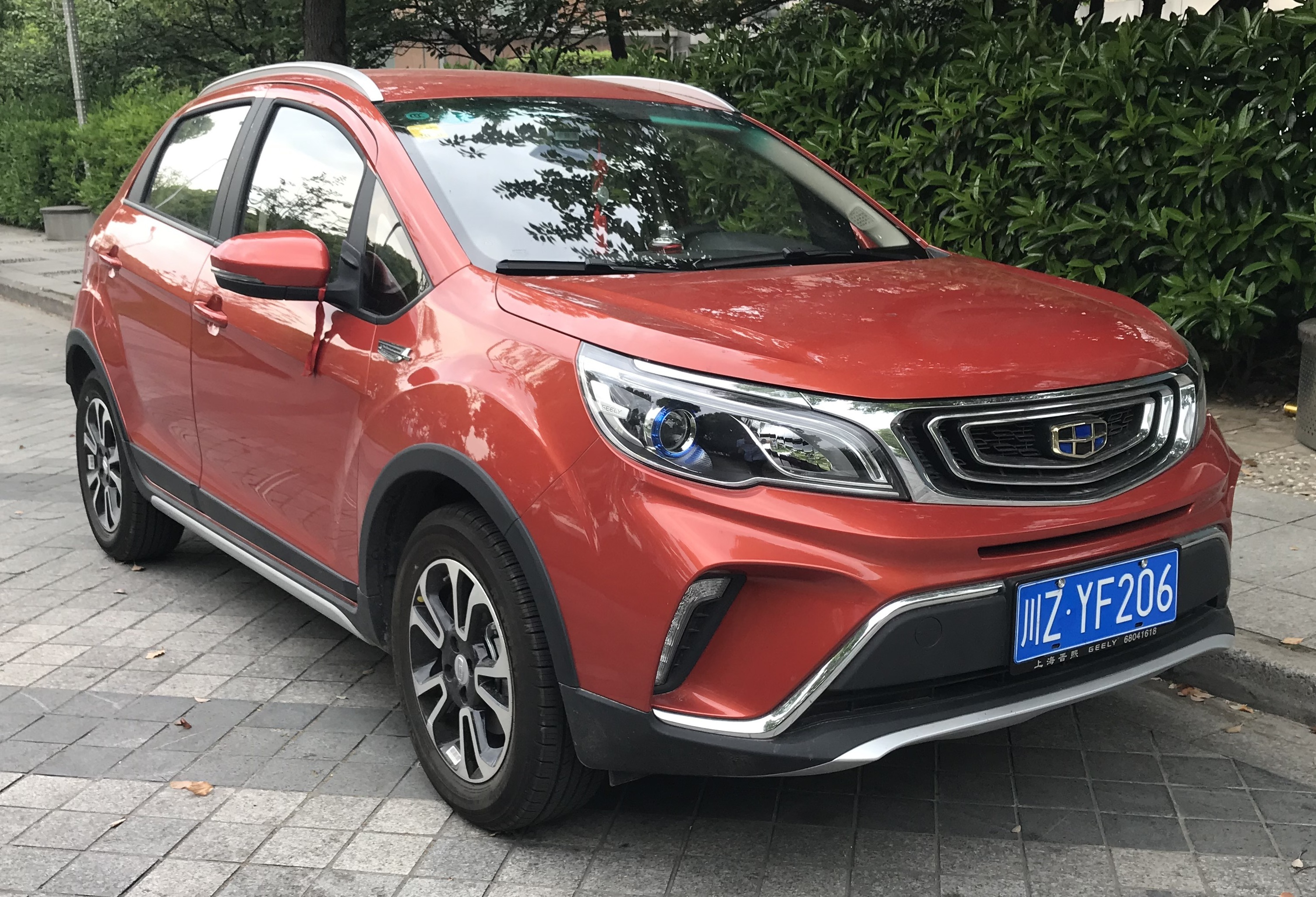
Maple X3 PRO

== See also ==
- Ganja Auto Plant
- Azsamand
