= Geely Emgrand =

Compact car

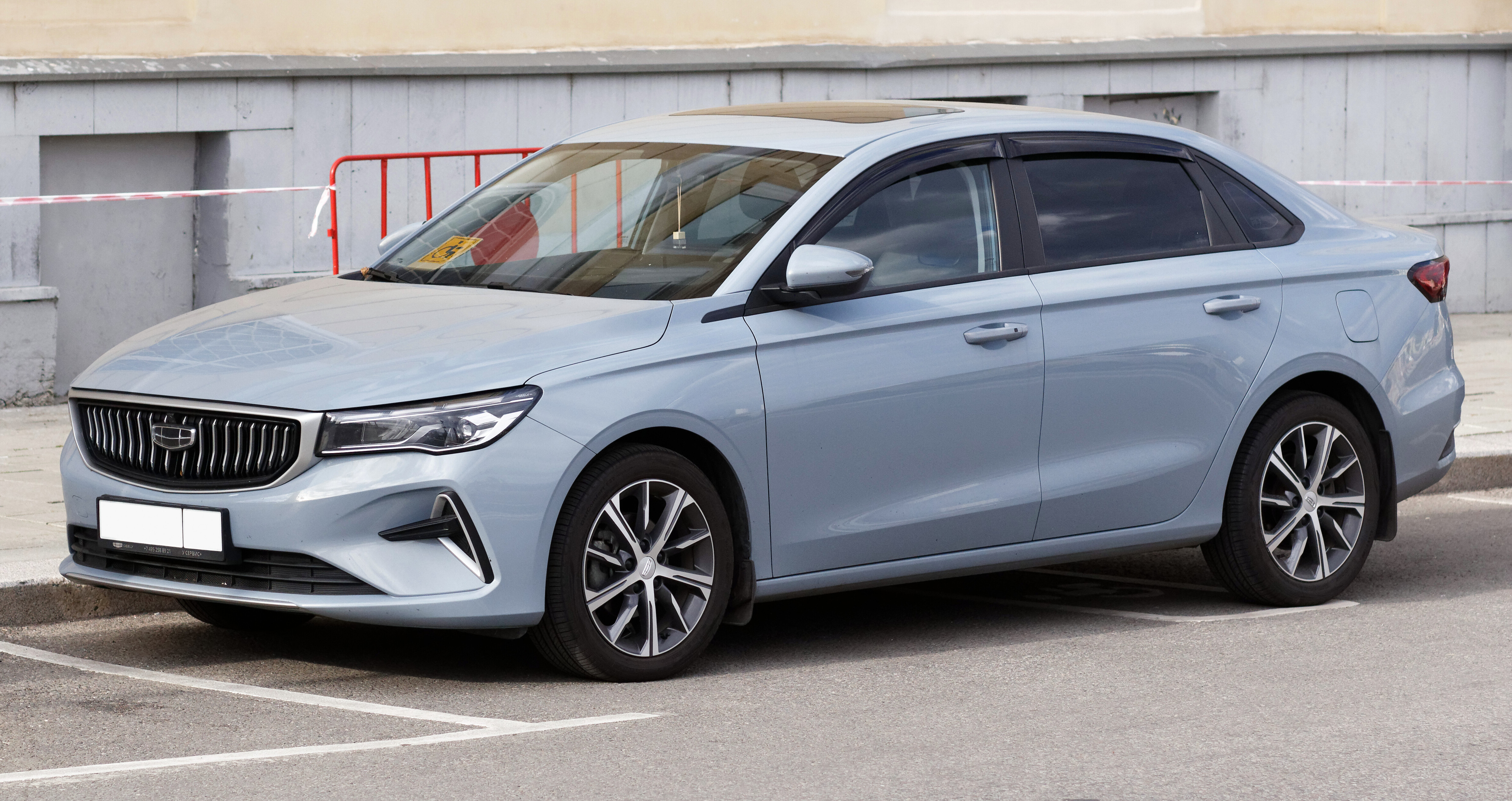
- Geely Emgrand (fourth generation)

Overview
- Manufacturer: Geely Auto
- Also called: Emgrand EC7
- Production: 2009–present

Body and chassis
- Class: Compact car (C)
- Body style: 4-door sedan 5-door hatchback (2009–2018)
- Layout: Front-engine, front-wheel-drive

Chronology
- Successor: Geely Yuanjing S1 (hatchback)

The Geely Emgrand (Chinese: 吉利帝豪; pinyin: Jílì Dìháo), originally the Emgrand EC7, is a car produced by Chinese automaker Geely Auto. After the discontinuation of the Emgrand brand, the EC7 was renamed to the Geely Emgrand in 2014.

== First generation (FE-1/FE-2 2009) ==
First generation
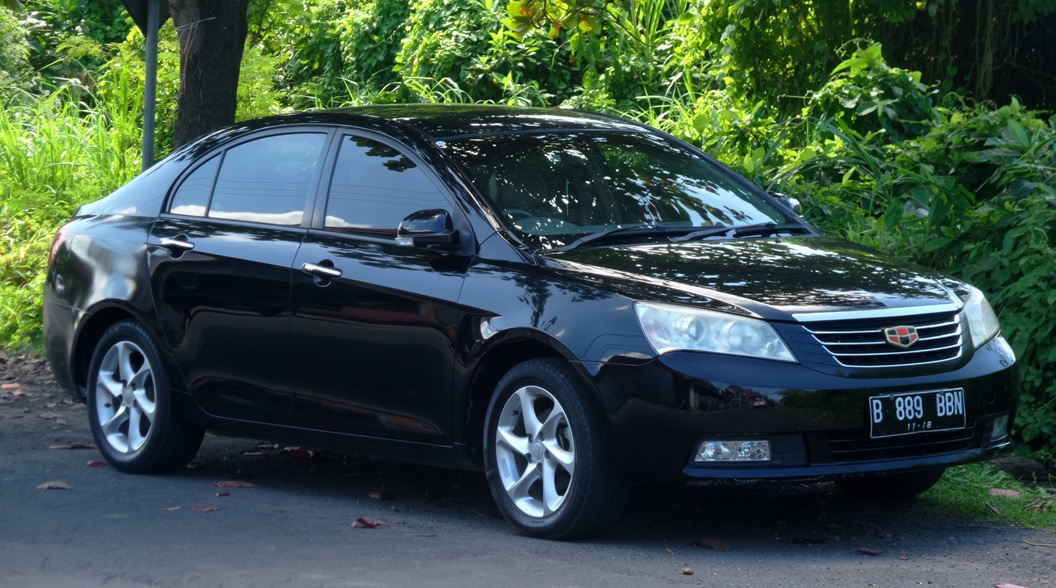
- Pre-facelift Emgrand EC7

Overview
- Model code: FE-1 (sedan); FE-2 (hatchback)
- Also called: Emgrand EC7; Geely Emgrand EC7; Geely Emgrand (Note: After discontinuation of the Emgrand brand.); Tobe M'way (Sedan, Taiwan); Tobe Q'way (hatchback, Taiwan); Matchedje X3 (Mozambique)
- Production: 2009–2014 (China); 2009–2021 (International)
- Assembly: China: Ningbo, Zhejiang; Uruguay: Montevideo (Nordex); Russia: Cherkessk, Karachay-Cherkessia (Derways), Sri Lanka: Polgahawela (Micro Cars); Taiwan: Miaoli (Yulon)

Powertrain
- Engine: 1.3 L JLB-4G13T I4 (turbo petrol) (2014–2017); 1.5 L JLy-4G15 I4 (petrol); 1.8 L JL-4G18 I4 (petrol)
- Electric motor: One 100 kW (134 hp; 136 PS) Permanent magnet synchronous motor (Emgrand EC7 EV 400 & 500)
- Transmission: 6-speed manual (1.3 variants only); 5-speed manual (2009–present); CVT (2014–present)
- Battery: 45.3 kWh Ternary Lithium Battery + 3.0 ITCS Intelligent Temperature Control Management System (Emgrand EC7 EV 400); 52.7 kWh Ternary Lithium Battery + 3.0 ITCS Intelligent Temperature Control Management System (Emgrand EC7 500)
- Electric range: 165 km (103 mi) (Emgrand EC7 EV 400); 258 km (160 mi) (Emgrand EC7 EV 500)

Dimensions
- Wheelbase: 2,650 mm (104.3 in)
- Length: 4,635 mm (182.5 in) (sedan); 4,397 mm (173.1 in) (hatchback)
- Width: 1,789 mm (70.4 in)
- Height: 1,470 mm (57.9 in)
- Kerb weight: 1,258–1,310 kg (2,773–2,888 lb)

The EC7 was the launch vehicle for the Emgrand (Chinese: 帝豪; pinyin: Dìháo) brand, the medium-to-high-end luxury brand that was launched by Geely in July 2009. It was originally launched with Geely's developed engines, a 1.5-litre inline-four engine known as JLy-4G15 and a 1.8-litre inline-four engine called JLy-4G18. A 2013 update of the EC7 added slightly smoked headlights, with no other changes.

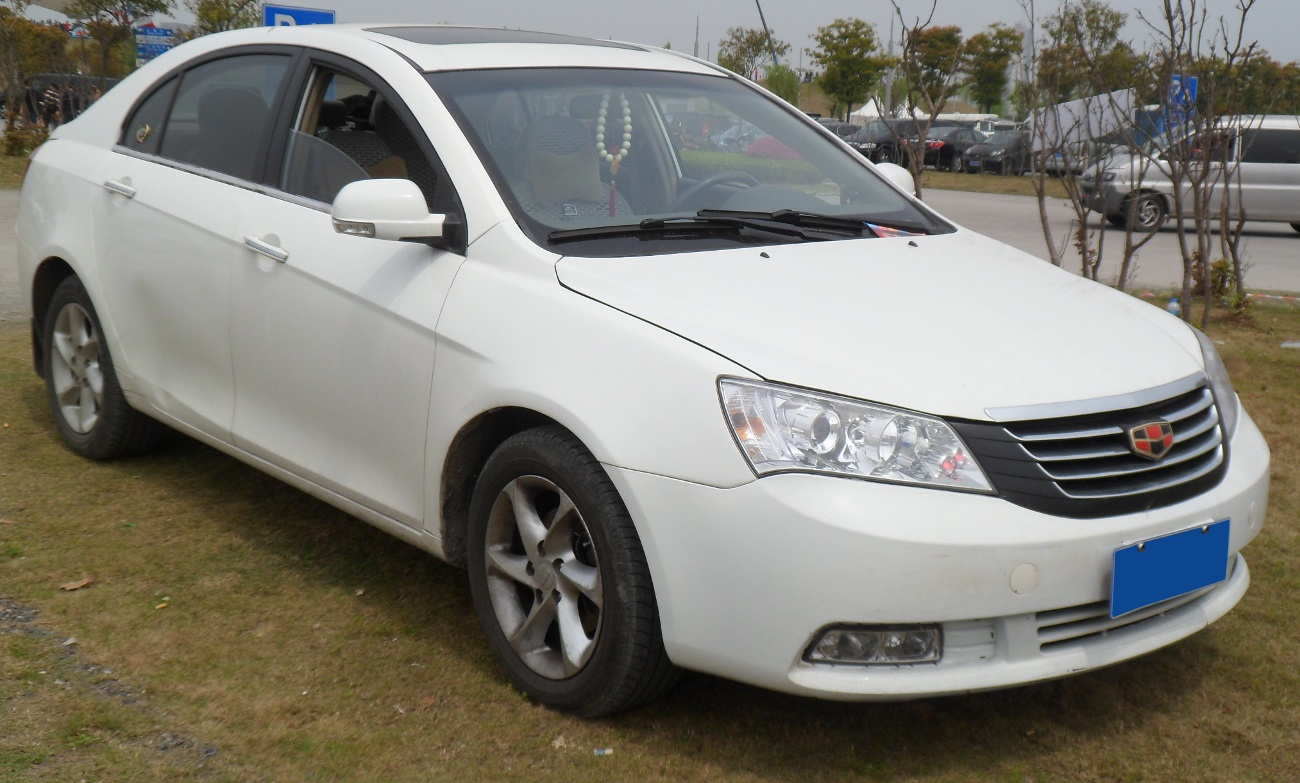
EC7 (front)

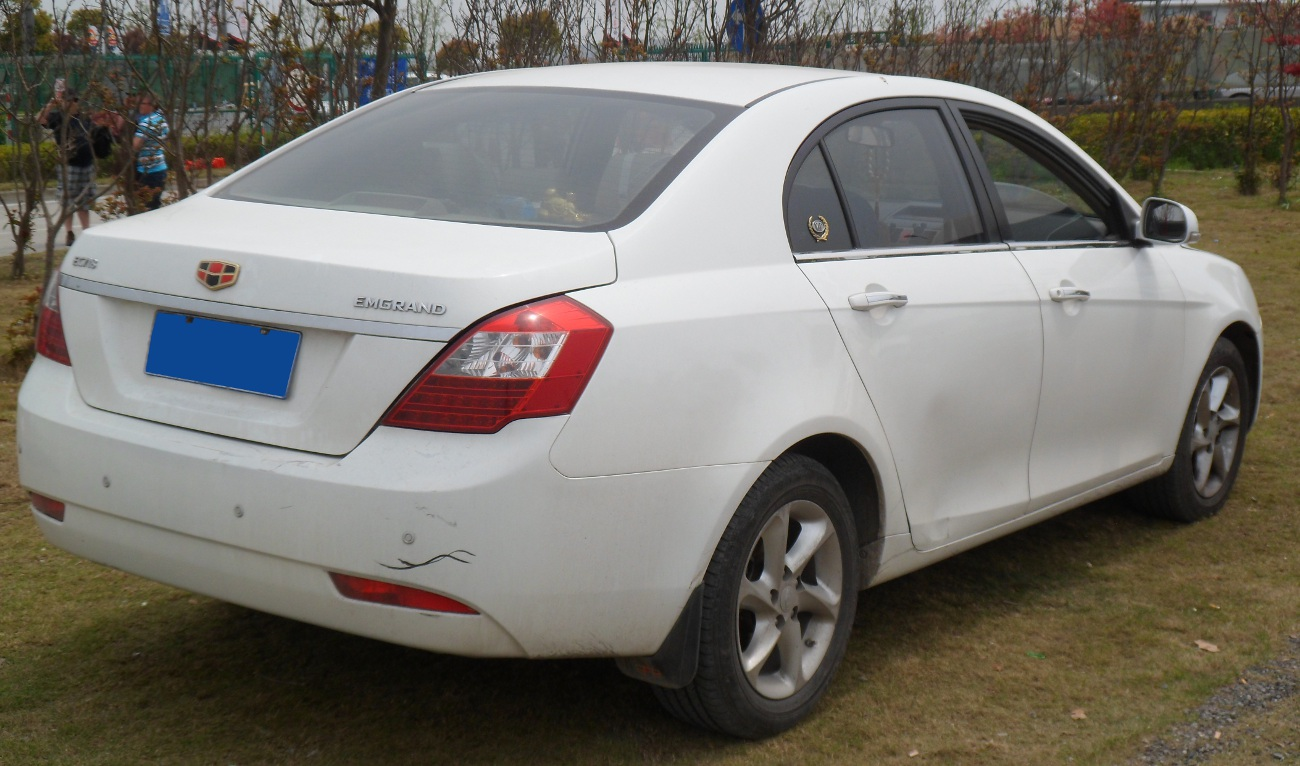
EC7 (rear)

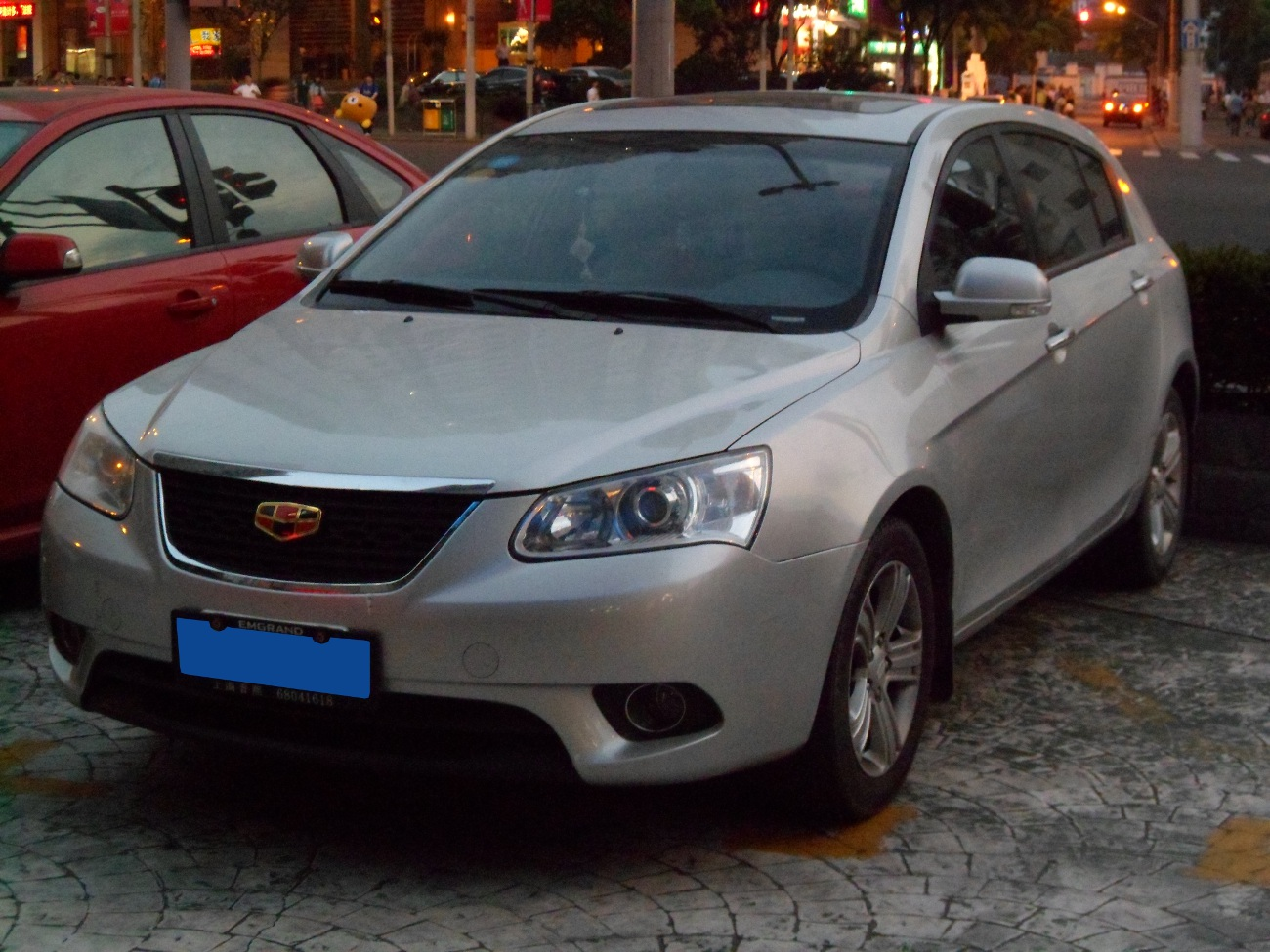
EC7-RV (front)

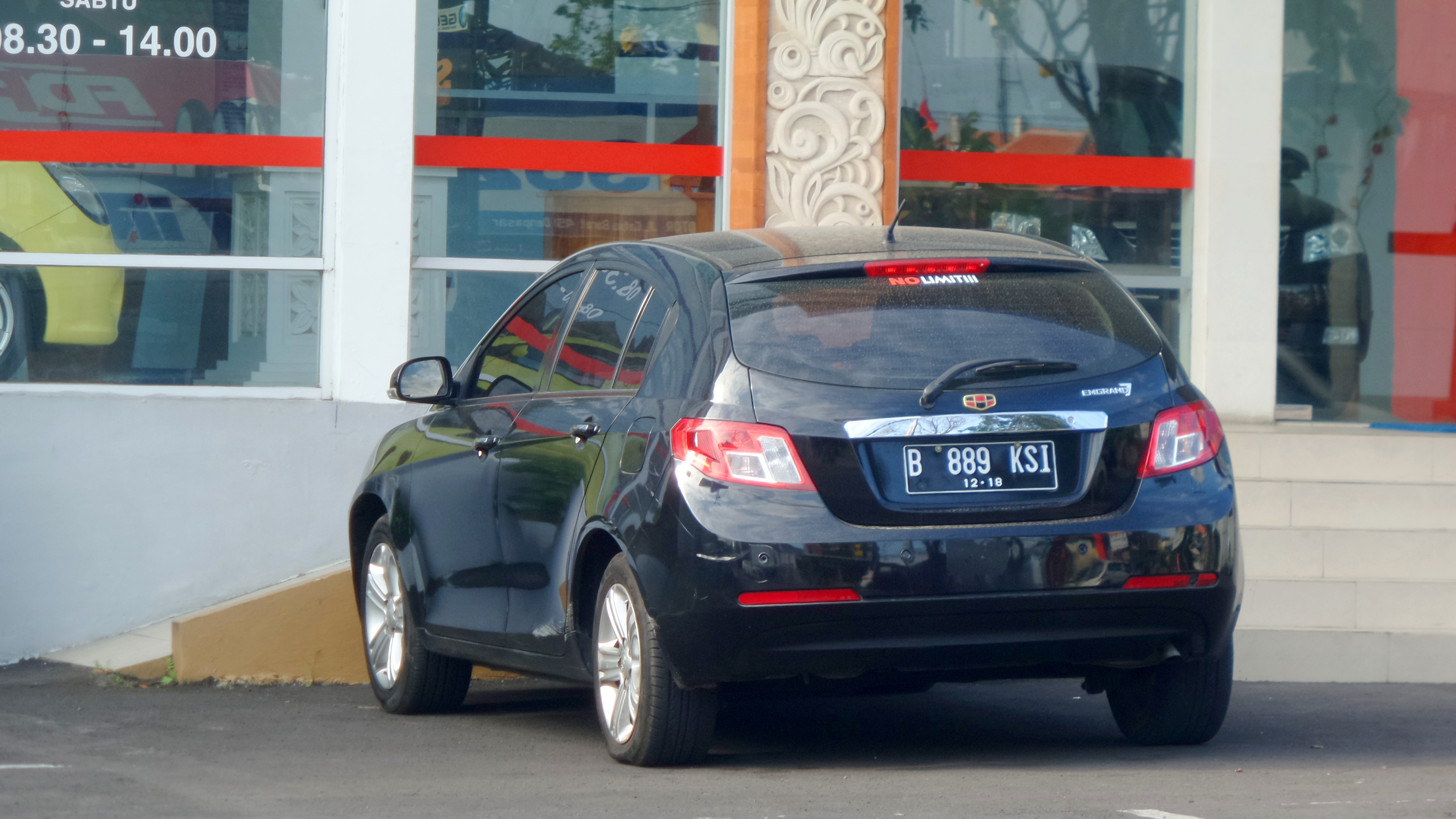
EC7-RV (rear)

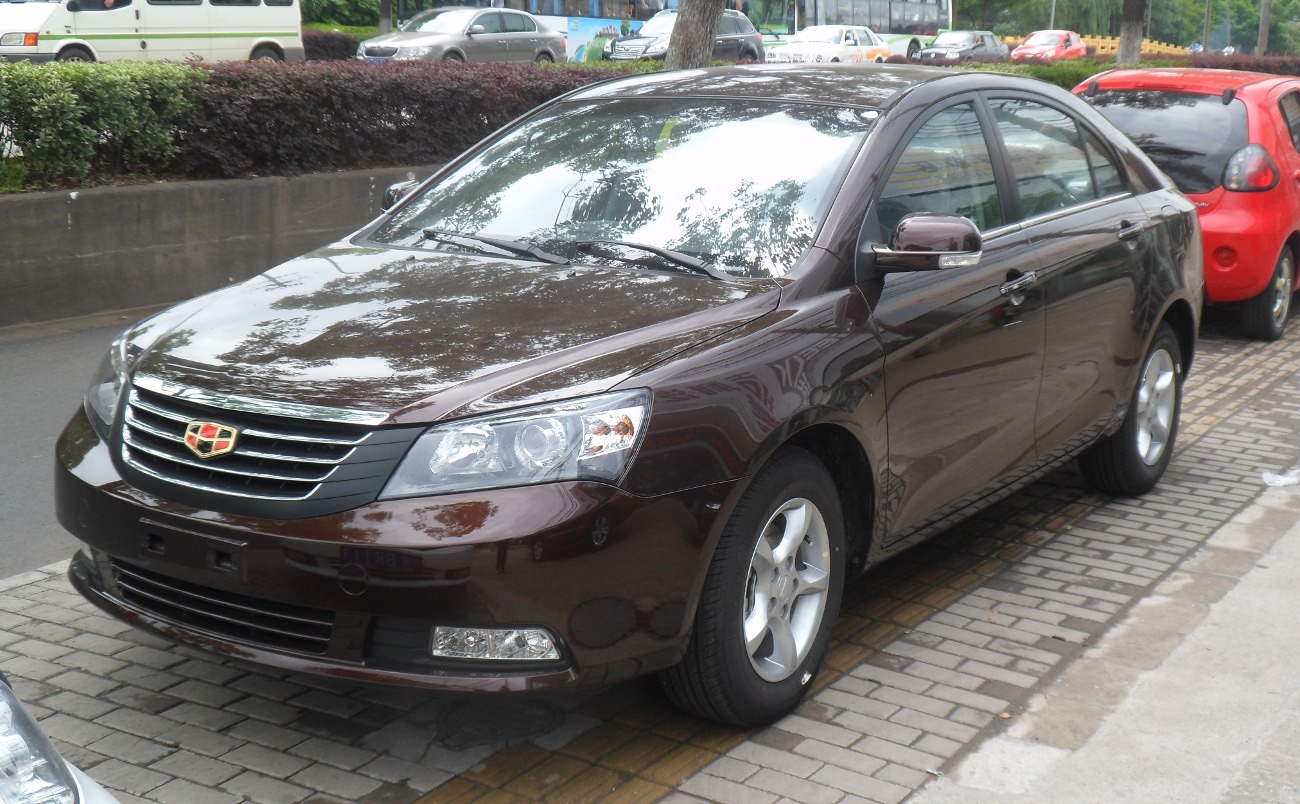
EC7 (update)

=== Development ===
The car was developed from the outset as an export model. Geely enlisted the services of a range of suppliers, including Siemens for the electronic control system, Lear Corporation for the seats, and Saint-Gobain for the glass. The production line was equipped with products from Fuji, PDE, and Dürr AG.

=== Global sales ===
In preparation for its introduction into the European market, the EC7 scored 4 stars in the Euro NCAP tests, the first car designed and produced in China to do so. Prices were estimated at £10,000 for the 1.5 model on launch. As of October 2015, it was China's best-selling domestic sedan.

==== Iraq ====
In Iraq, the EC7 and the larger EC8 are assembled by the state-owned company SCAI.

==== Iran ====
In Iran, the EC7 and EC7-RV are sold by Geelran Company, Geely Auto's official selling agent in Iran.

==== Namibia ====
The EC7 was launched in Namibia in 2013 at the same time as in South Africa.

==== Russia ====
The Emgrand EC7 was made by Derways under CKD on May 23, 2012. Derways recalled EC7s made from May 23, 2014 to November 21, 2014 due to problems with brake hoses.

==== South Africa ====
The EC7 was officially launched in South Africa in 2013, being sold at R149,000.

==== Sri Lanka ====
In Sri Lanka, the Emgrand EC7 is sold under the Micro brand, which is owned by Geely Auto.

==== Taiwan ====
The EC7 was sold as the Tobe M'way by Yulon in Taiwan from May 2012.

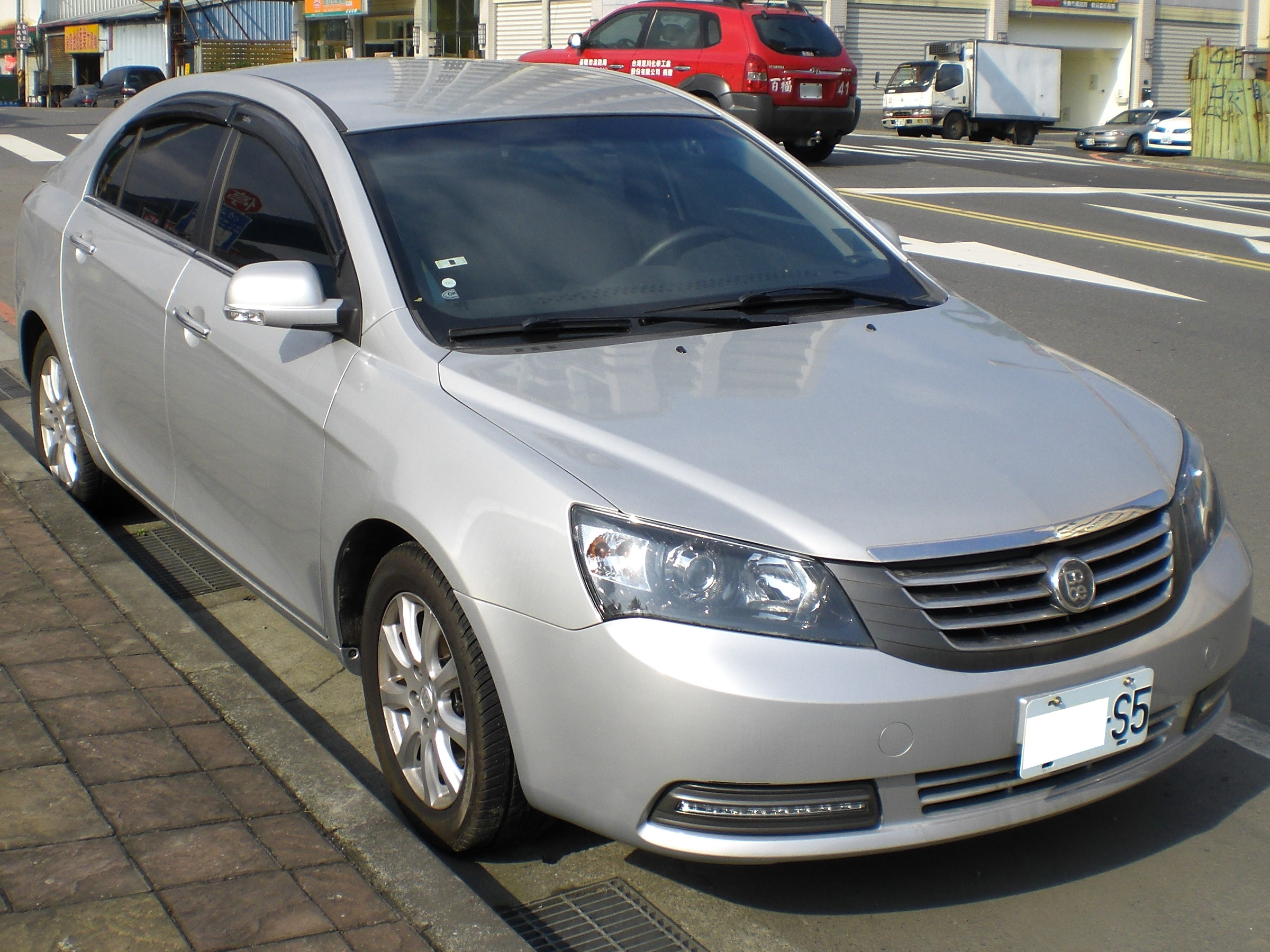
Tobe M'way (front)

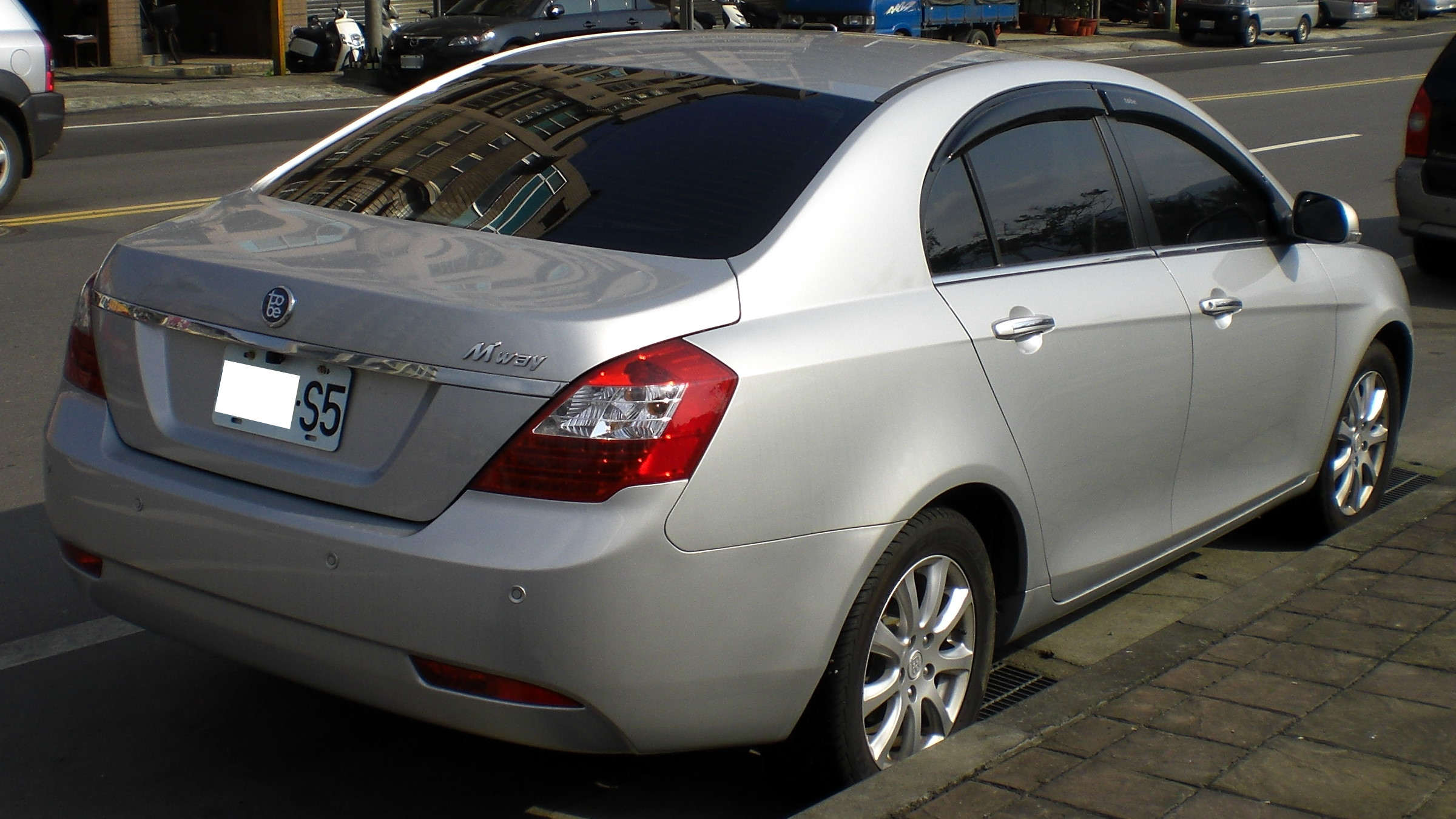
Tobe M'way (rear)

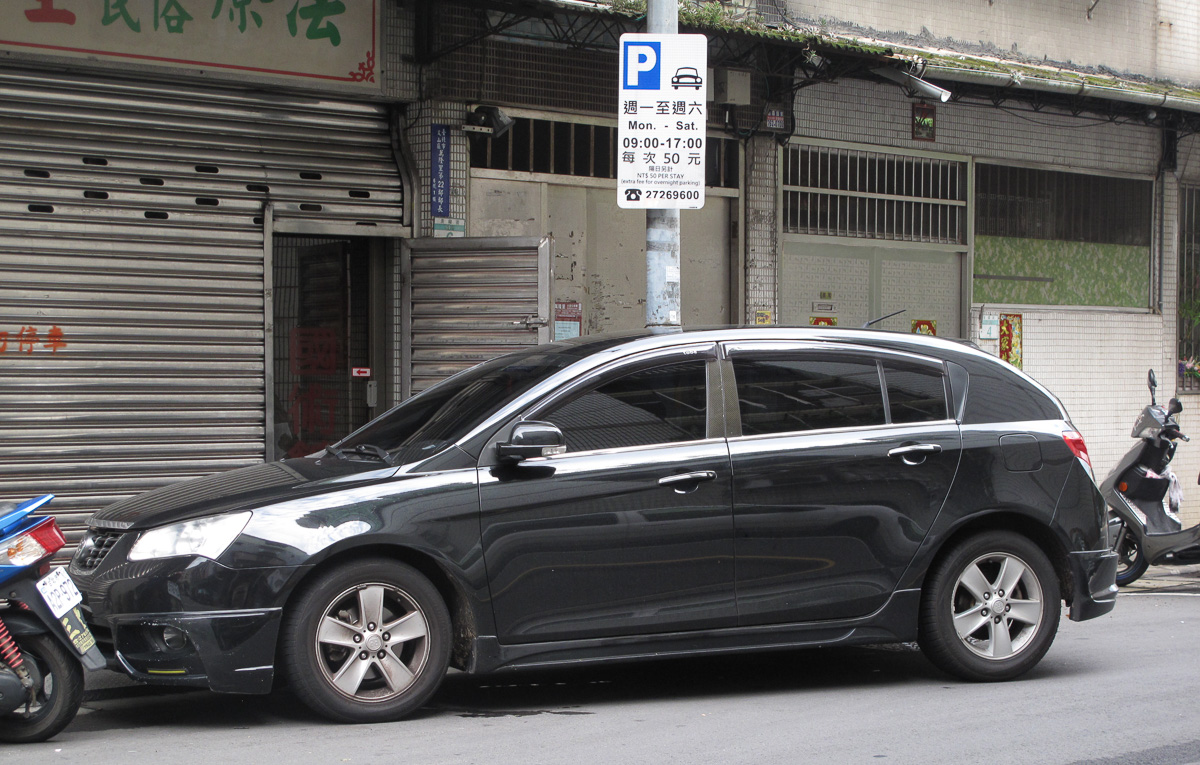
Tobe Q'way (front)

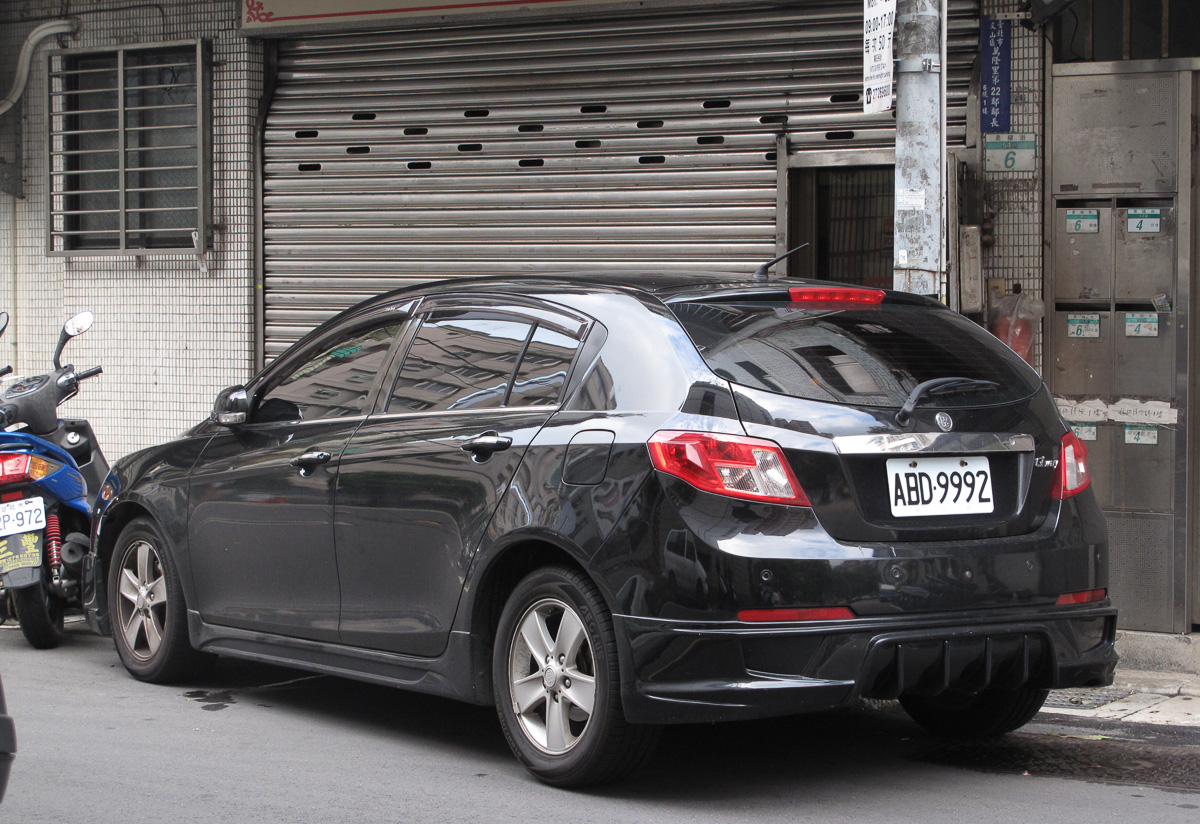
Tobe Q'way (rear)

=== United Kingdom ===
The car was scheduled to be launched into the United Kingdom market in late 2012. Geely established Geely Auto UK, a jointly-held subsidiary of Manganese Bronze Holdings and LTI based in Coventry.

In partnership with Manganese Bronze, Geely set up a 40-strong dealer organisation. Small family-style garages were chosen to sell the cars, being described as "the sort of garages that used to sell Škodas before the company was owned by Volkswagen, and the type of establishment that once might have sold Rovers."

== Second generation (FE-3; 2014) ==
Second generation
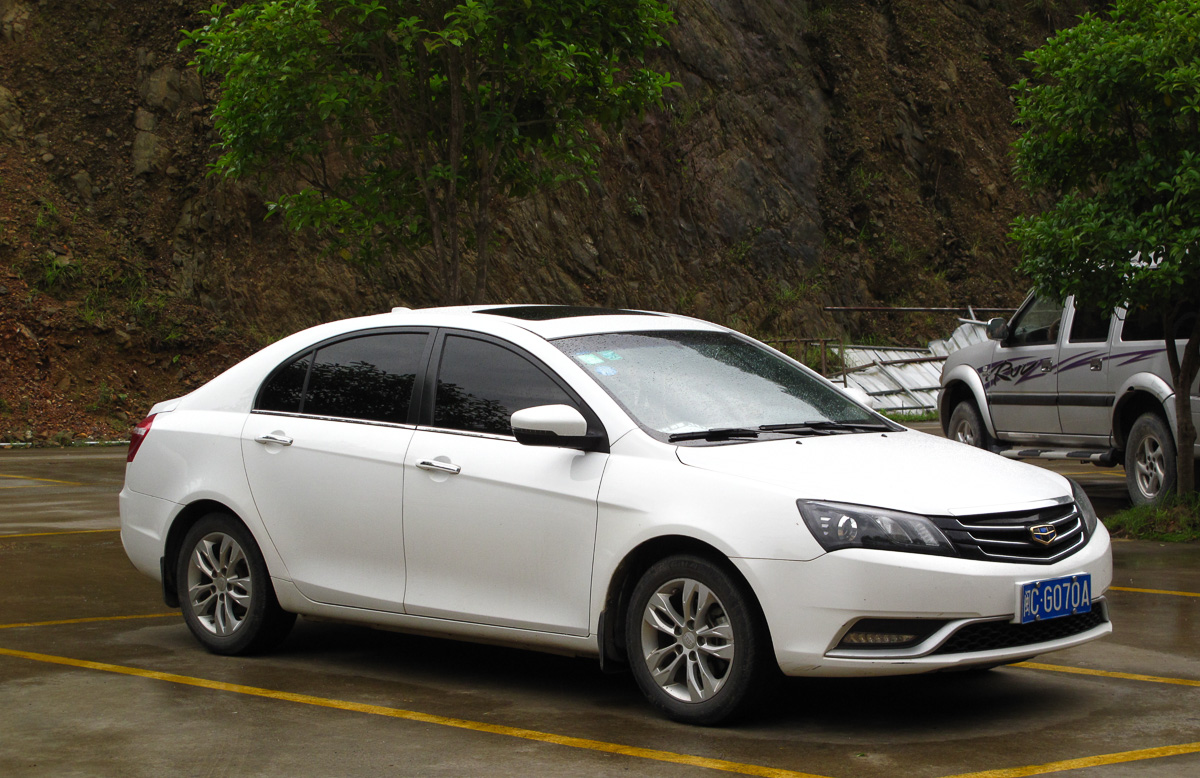
- Second generation Geely Emgrand pre-facelift

Overview
- Model code: FE-3
- Also called: Geely Emgrand EC7; Geely Emgrand 7
- Production: 2014–2018
- Assembly: China: Ningbo, Zhejiang; Belarus: Barysaw, Minsk (BelGee)

Powertrain
- Engine: 1.3 L JLB-4G13T I4 (turbo petrol) (2014–2017); 1.5 L JLy-4G15 I4 (petrol)
- Electric motor: Permanent magnet synchronous motor (Emgrand EC7 EV 400 & 500)
- Transmission: 6-speed manual (1.3 variants only); 5-speed manual CVT (2014–present)
- Battery: Ternary Lithium Battery + 3.0 ITCS Intelligent Temperature Control Management System (Emgrand EC7 EV 400 & 500)

Dimensions
- Wheelbase: 2,650 mm (104.3 in)
- Length: 4,635 mm (182.5 in) (sedan); 4,397 mm (173.1 in) (hatchback)
- Width: 1,789 mm (70.4 in)
- Height: 1,470 mm (57.9 in)
- Kerb weight: 1,258–1,310 kg (2,773–2,888 lb)

The second generation Geely Emgrand was shown to the public in the 2014 Beijing Auto Show carrying the new Geely Earth emblem. The replacement of the emblem marked the end of the Emgrand premium brand for Geely. The second generation Emgrand is based on the same platform as the EC7.

=== Facelift ===
The second-generation Emgrand sedan received a facelift in 2016 for the 2017 model year, donning Geely's "Cosmos" grille as well as redesigned taillights.

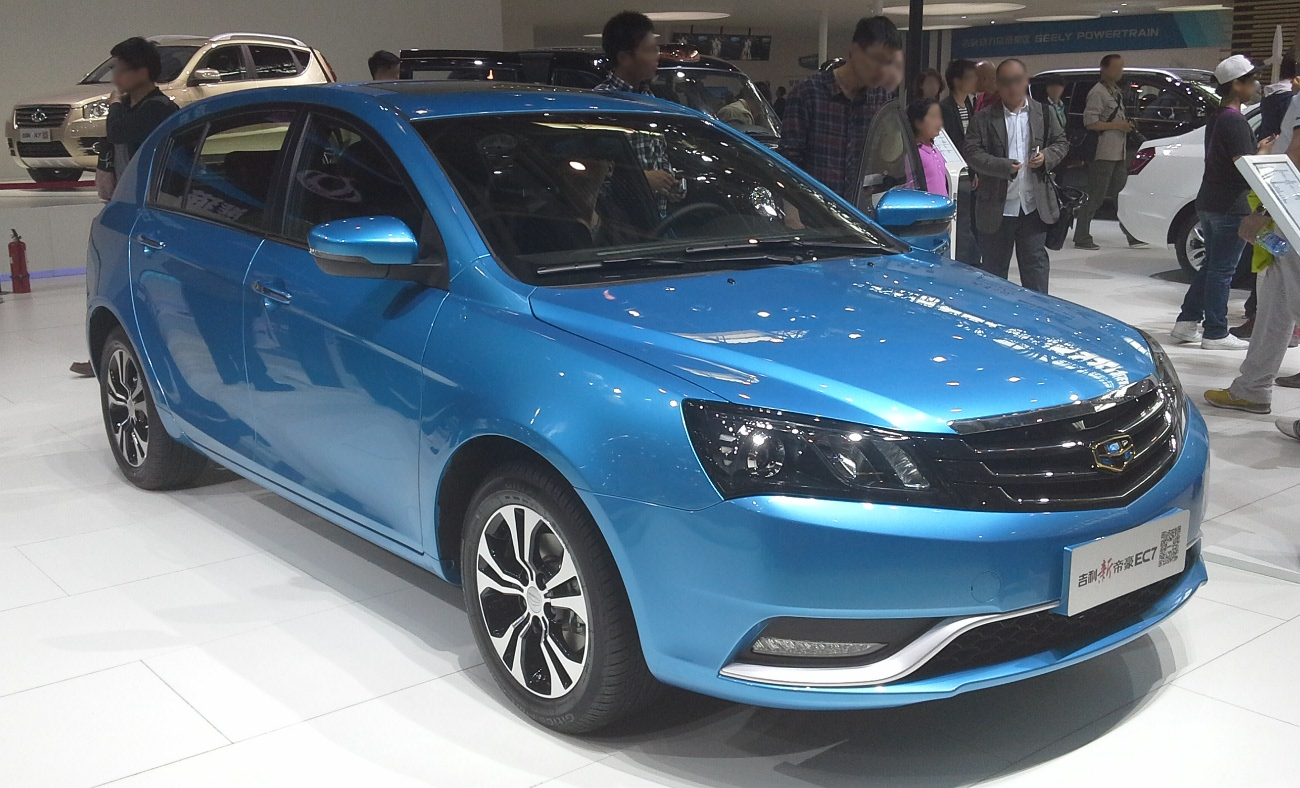
Emgrand EC7-RV facelift (front)

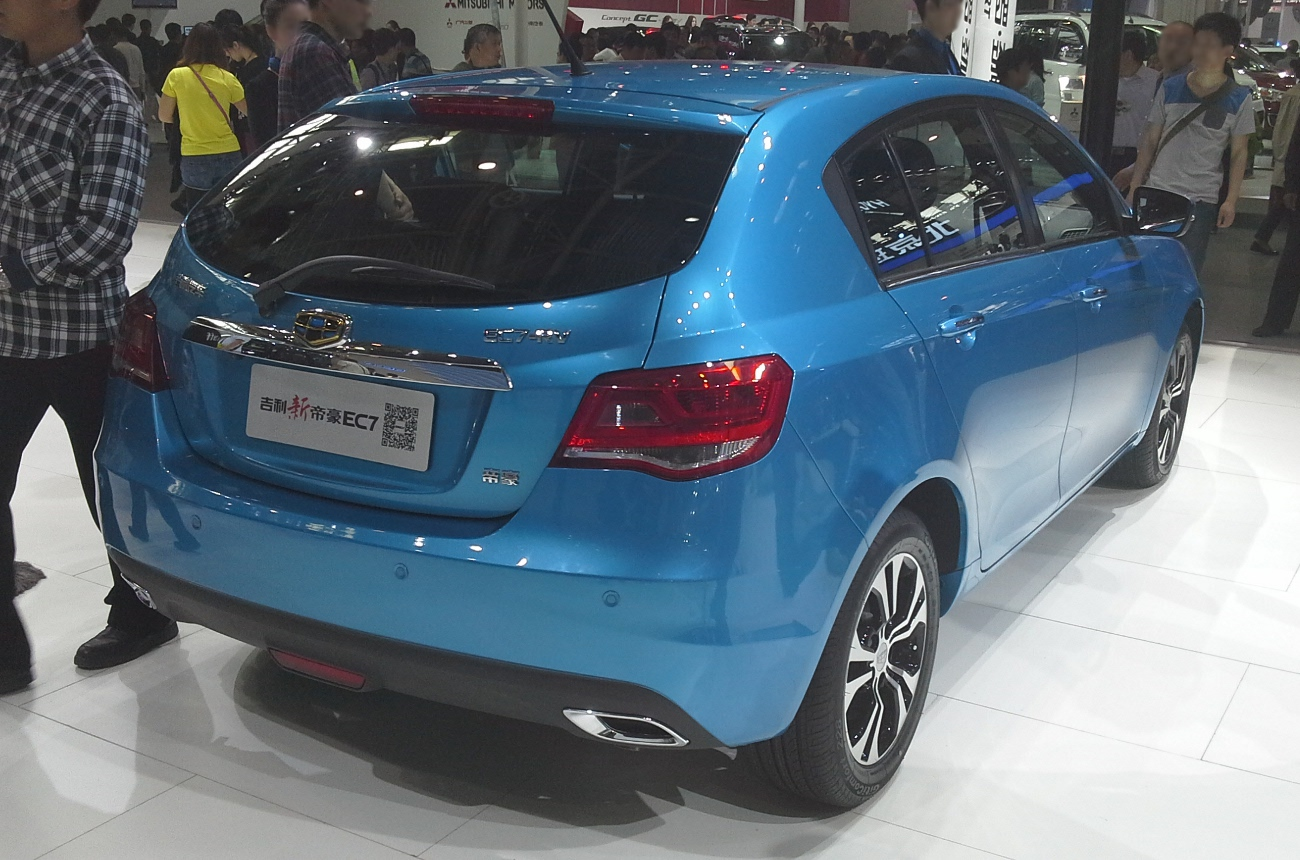
Emgrand EC7-RV facelift (rear)

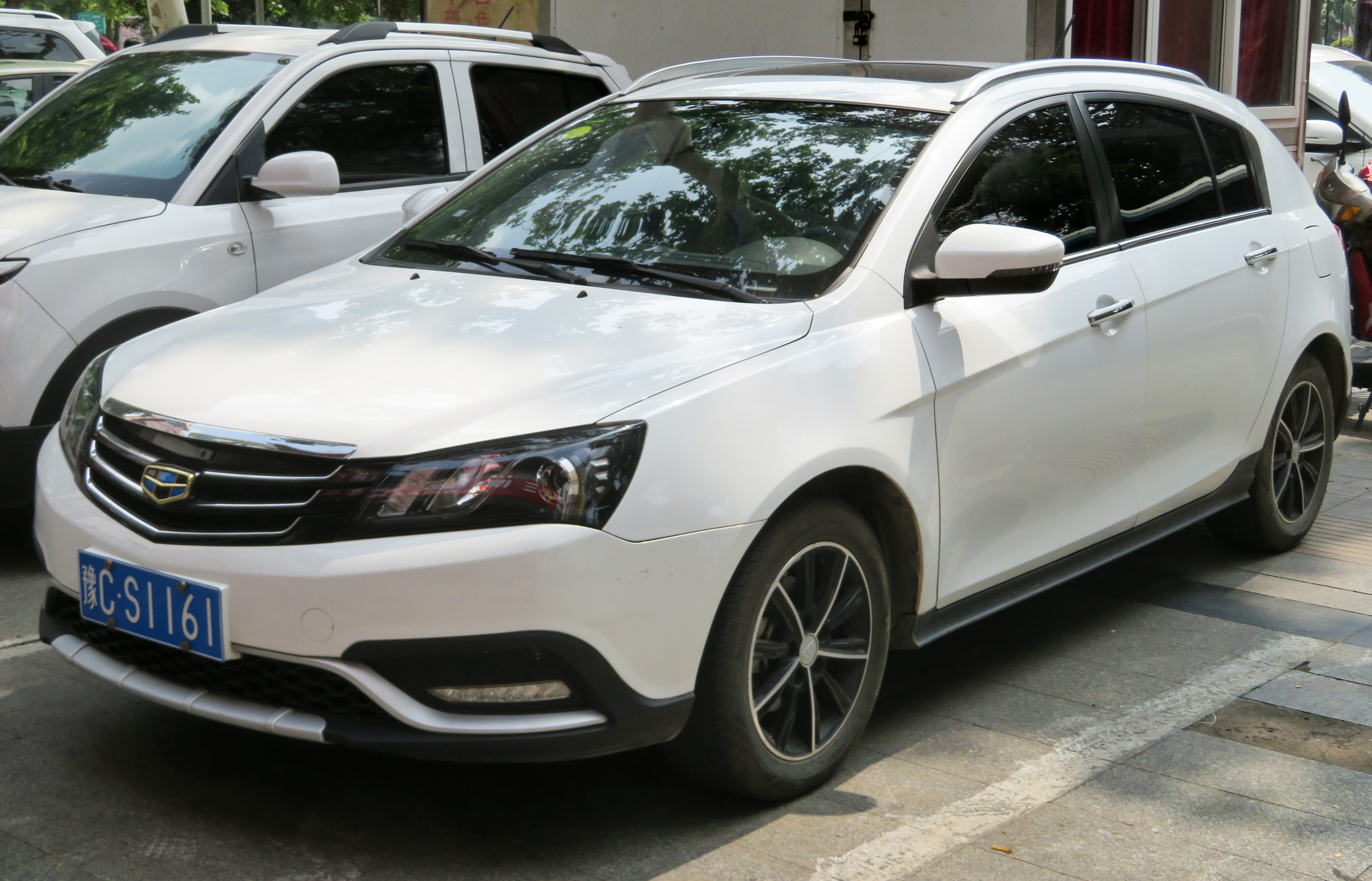
Emgrand EC7-RV facelift

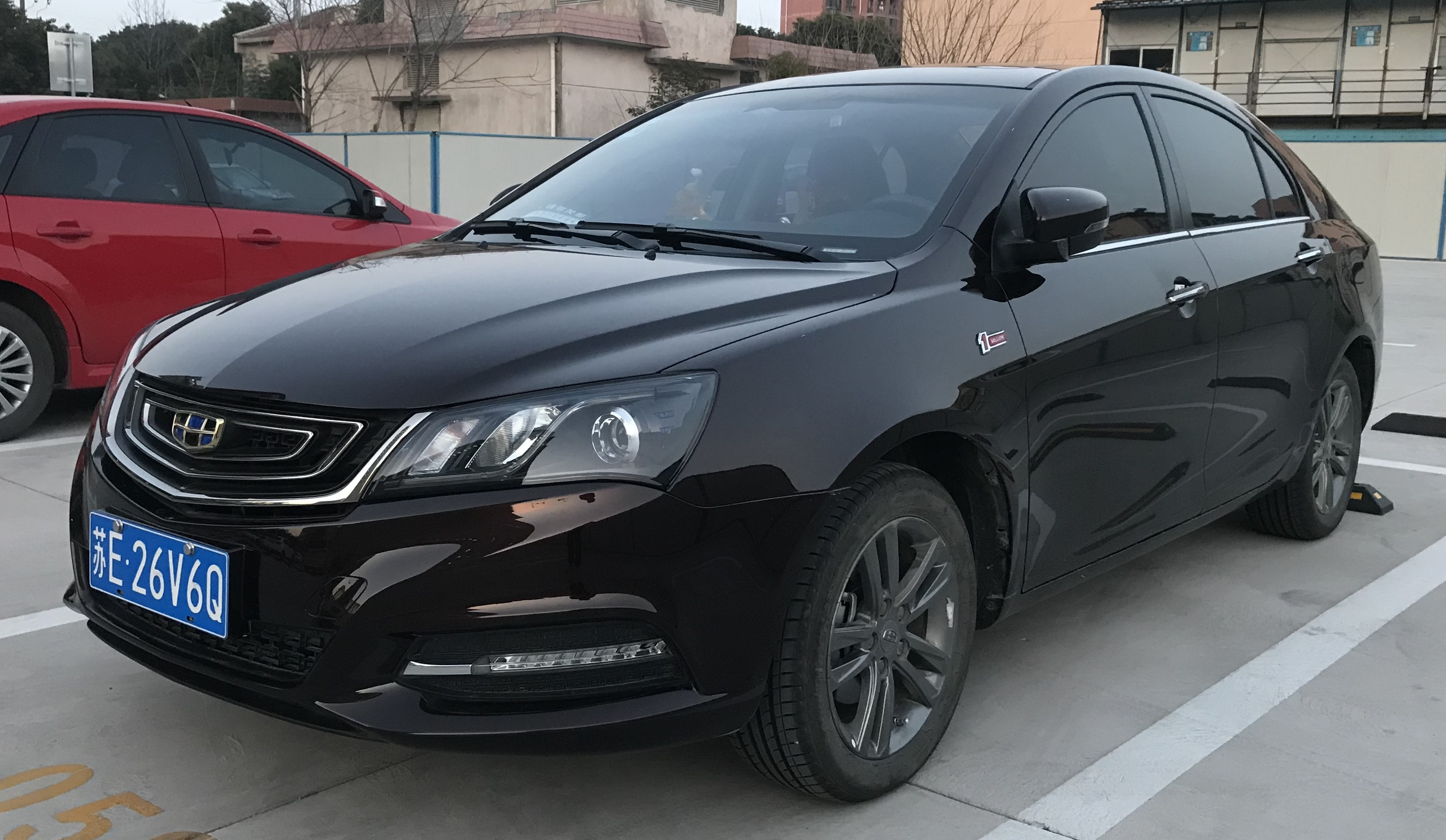
Geely Emgrand (front)

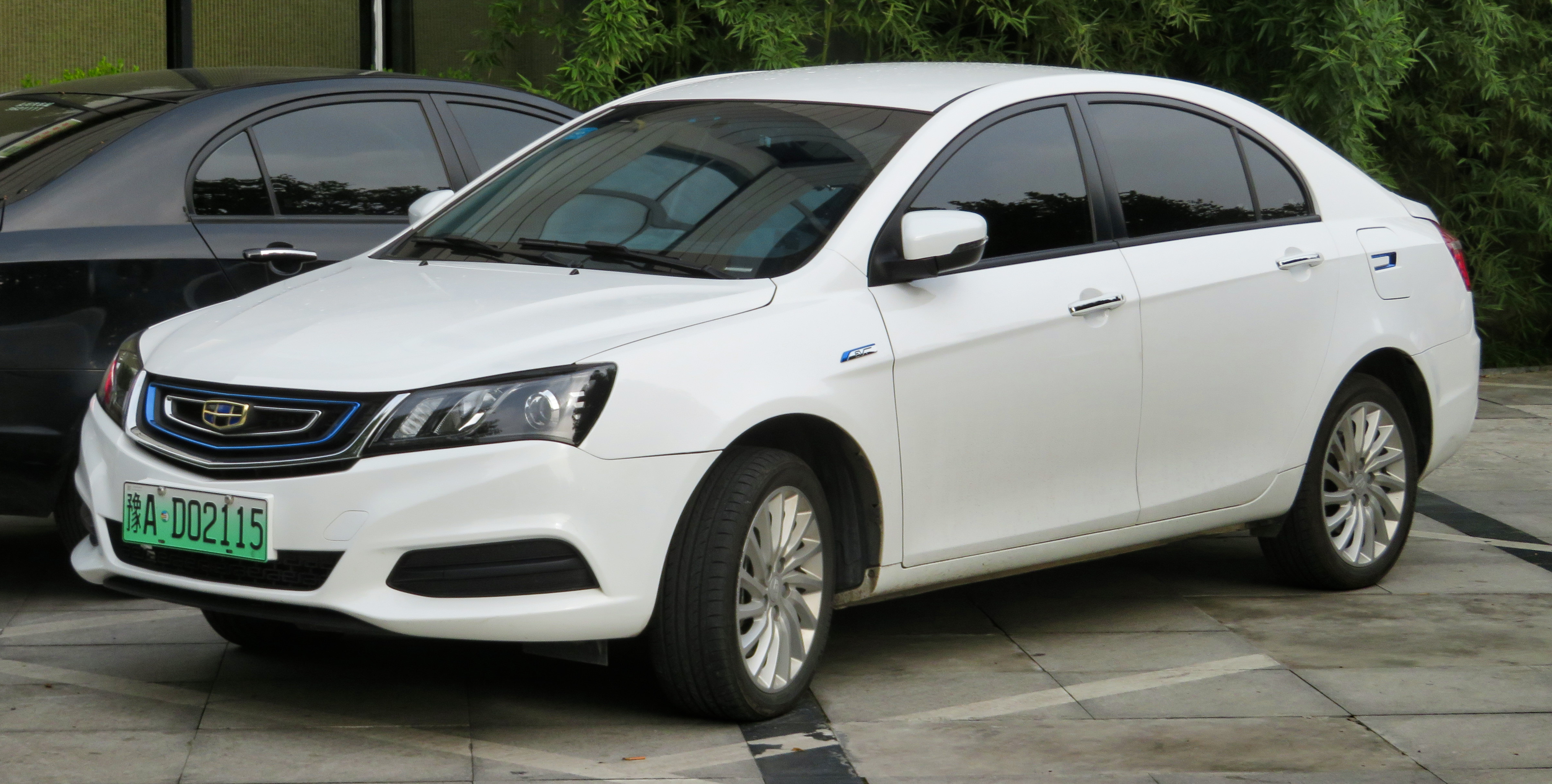
Geely Emgrand EV facelift (front)

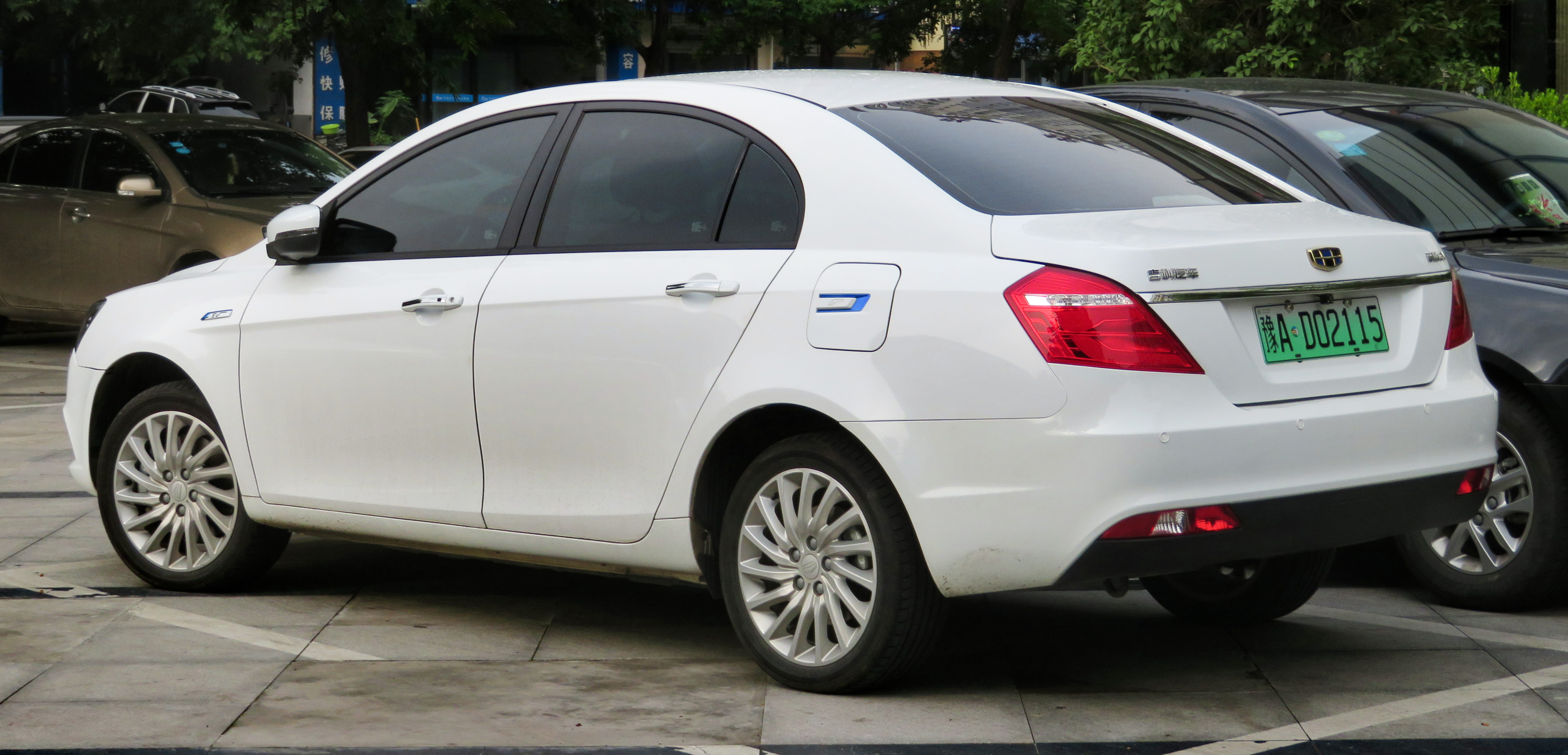
Geely Emgrand EV facelift (rear)

=== Global sales ===
==== Belarus ====
In Belarus, Belarusian-Chinese joint venture BelGee began production of the Geely Emgrand 7 in the autumn of 2018.

==== Russia ====
Despite the discontinuation of the Emgrand brand in the Chinese home market, the Geely Emgrand was still sold as the Emgrand EC7 in Russia. The second-generation EC7 was introduced to the Russian market by Derways in February 2016.

== Third generation (FE-3; 2018) ==
Third generation
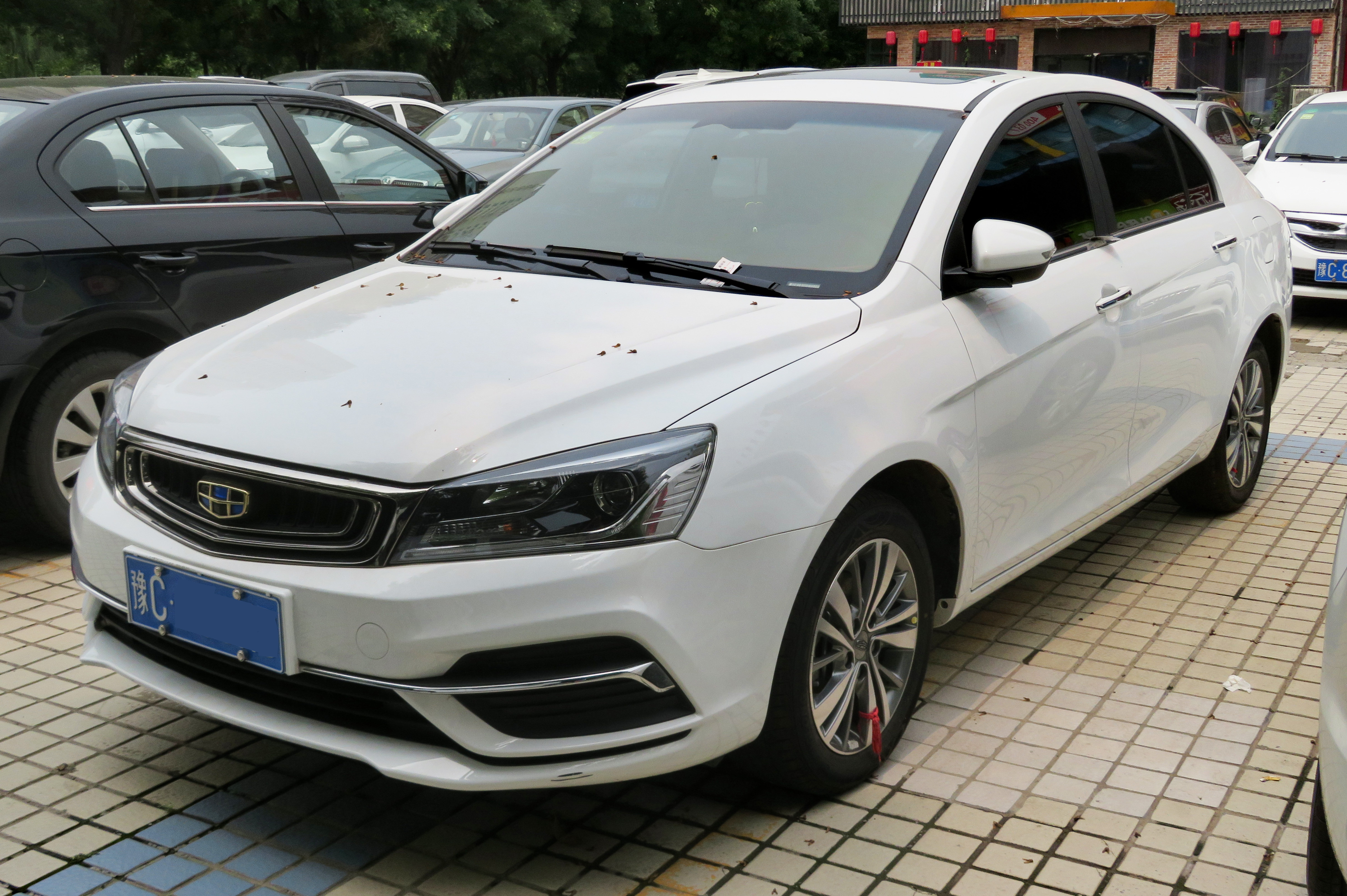
- 2018 Geely Emgrand facelift

Overview
- Model code: FE-3
- Production: 2018–2021
- Assembly: China: Ningbo, Zhejiang

Powertrain
- Engine: 1.5 L JLy-4G15 I4 (petrol)
- Electric motor: Permanent magnet synchronous motor
- Transmission: 5-speed manual CVT
- Battery: Ternary Lithium Battery + 3.0 ITCS Intelligent Temperature Control Management System

Dimensions
- Wheelbase: 2,650 mm (104.3 in)
- Length: 4,632 mm (182.4 in)
- Width: 1,789 mm (70.4 in)
- Height: 1,470 mm (57.9 in)
- Kerb weight: 1,255–1,285 kg (2,767–2,833 lb)

The third-generation Emgrand went on sale in May 2018 as a sedan only. The third-generation model uses the same platform that underpins the first and second-generation models. The update features a revised front and a completely redesigned rear end.

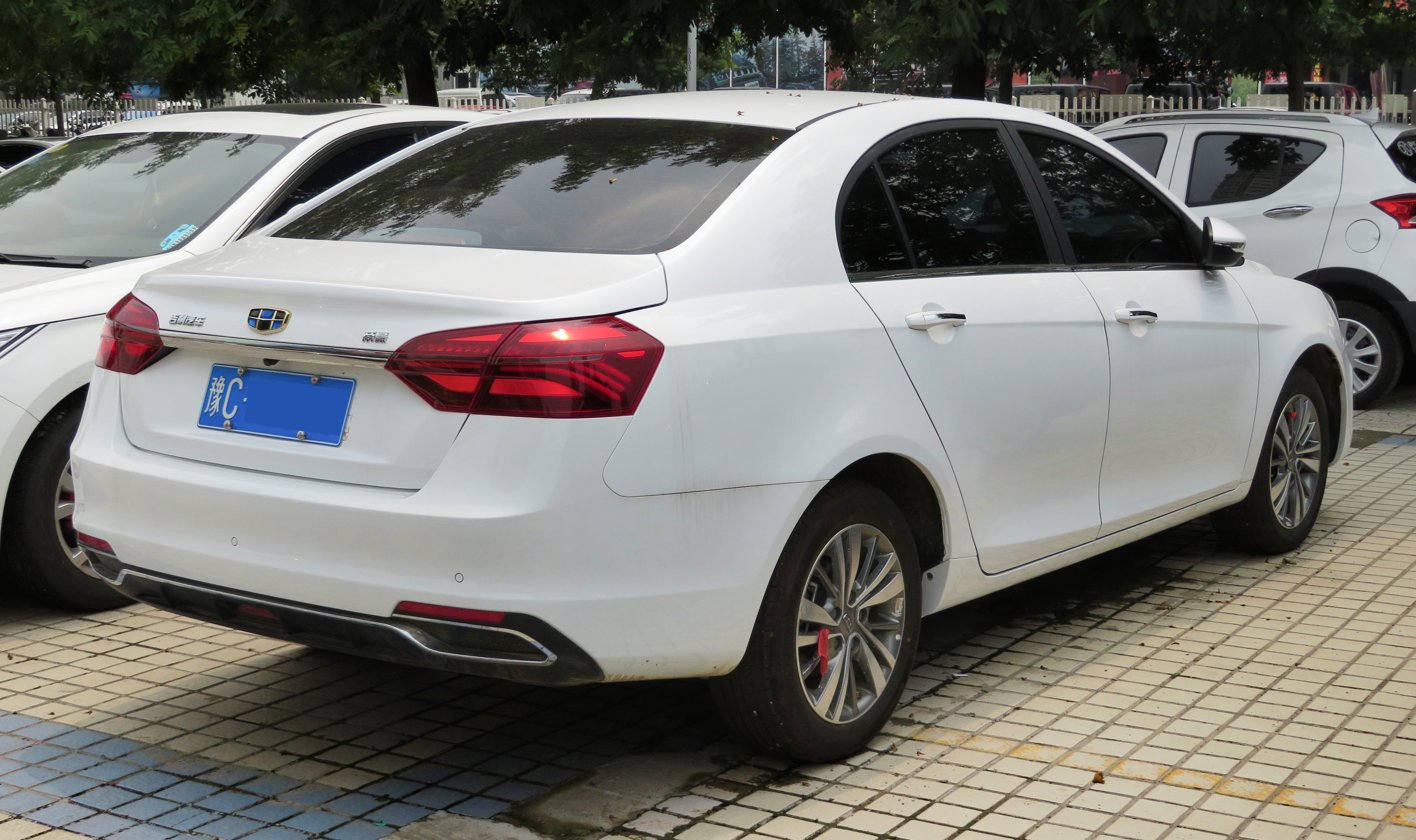
rear view

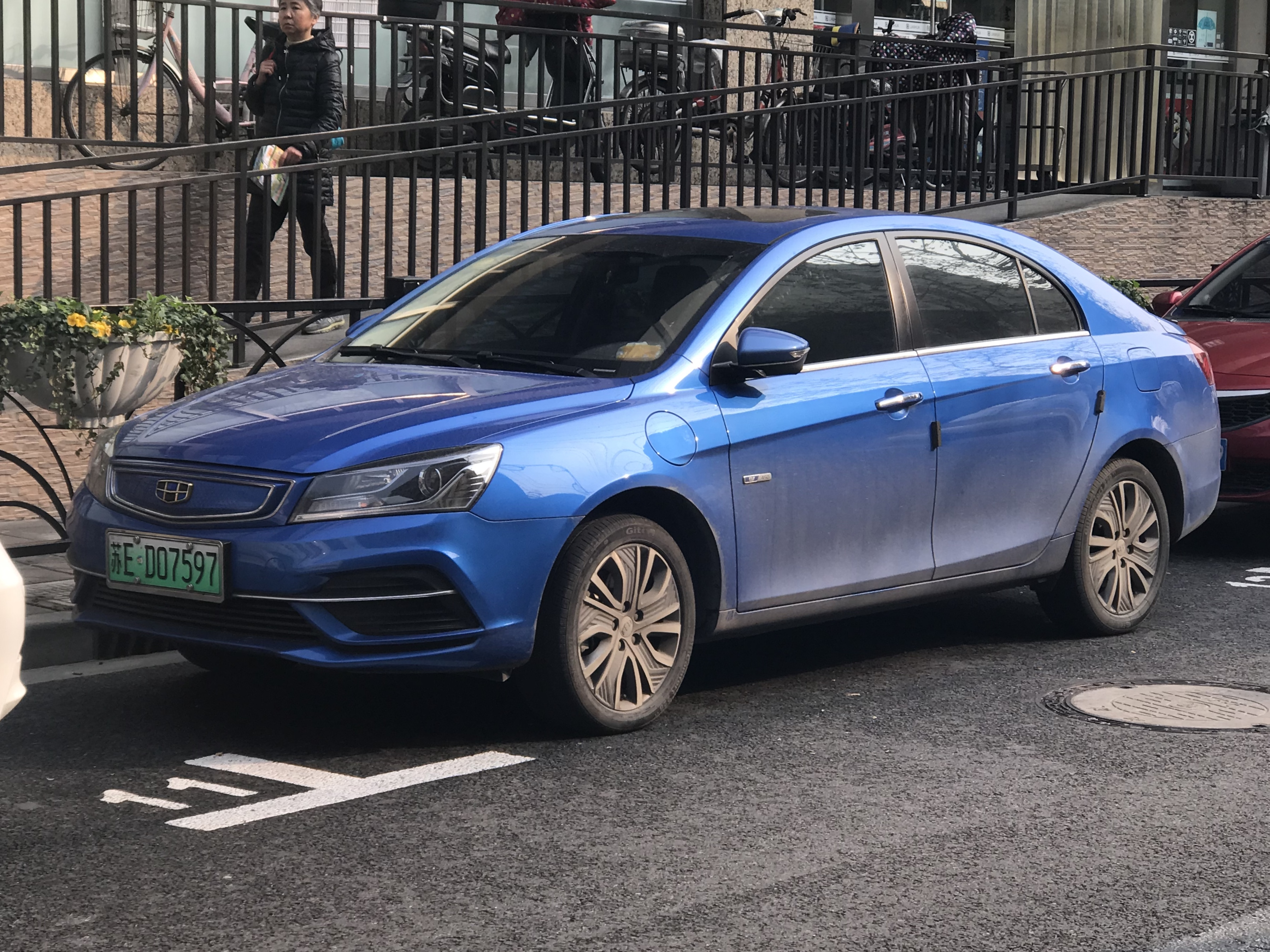
Emgrand EV

A minor facelift for the 2019 model year was launched mainly for the then-newly launched National VI Emission Standard. The update features a slightly revised grille and intake inserts on the exterior, and a new GKUI infotainment system, enabling mobile phone connection, Amap, an online music database, voice control, Himalaya FM radio, and vehicle function controls via a mobile app.

=== 2021 facelift ===
A facelift for the 2021 model year called the Geely Emgrand Up was launched in December 2020 alongside the Emgrand GL Up. The update is complete with what Geely calls the "4.0" design language and features a vertically slotted grille.

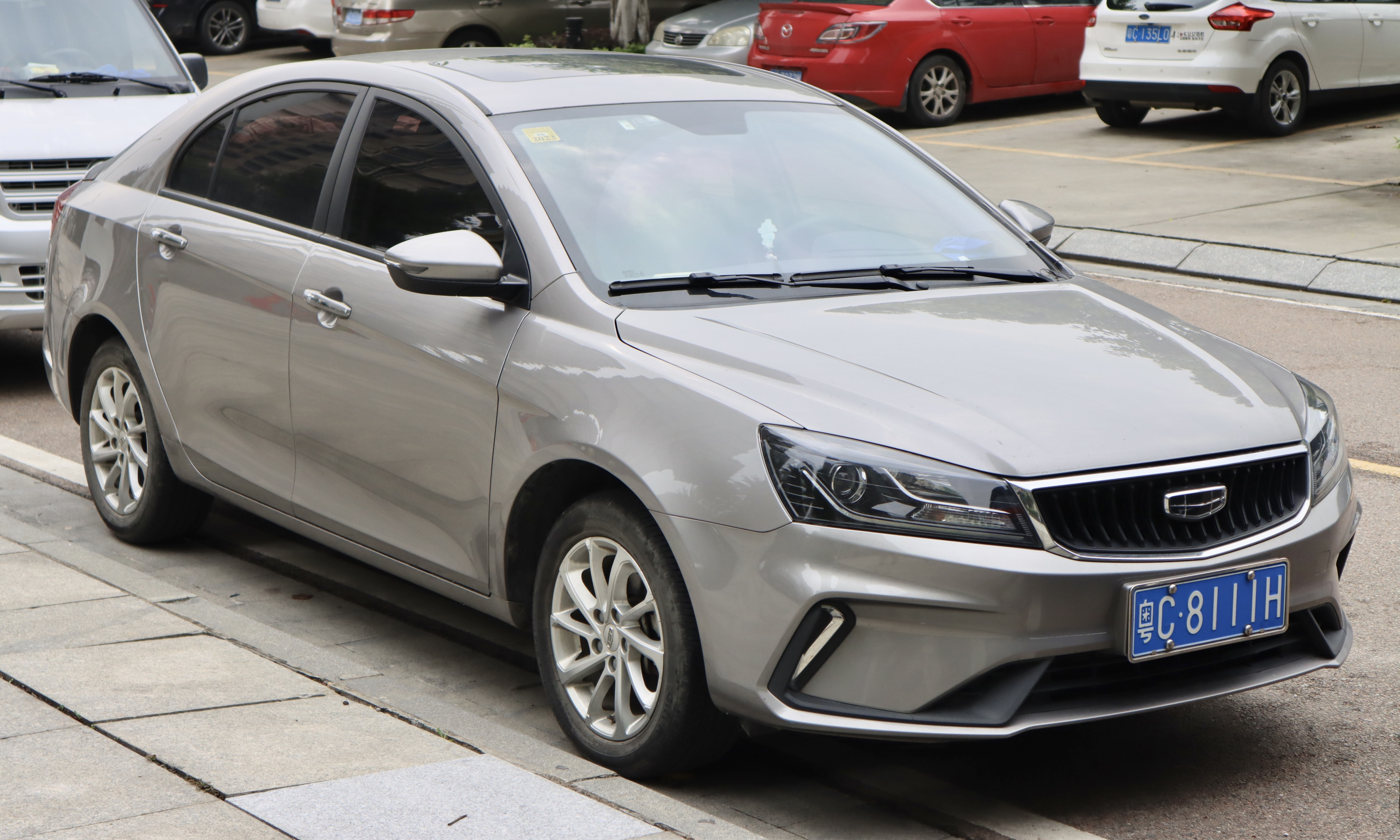
Geely Emgrand 2021 facelift

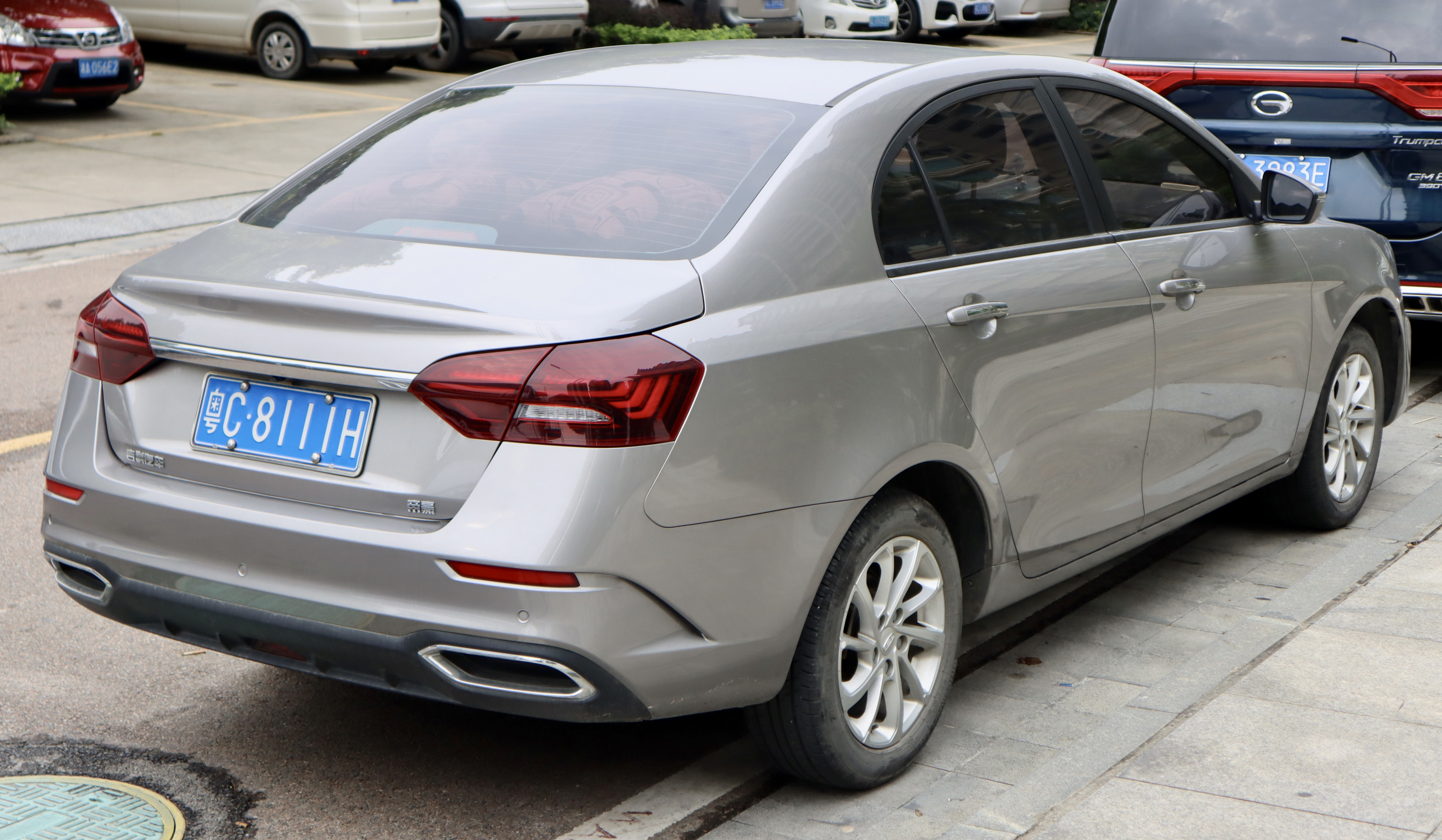
rear view

== Fourth generation (SS11; 2021) ==
Fourth generation
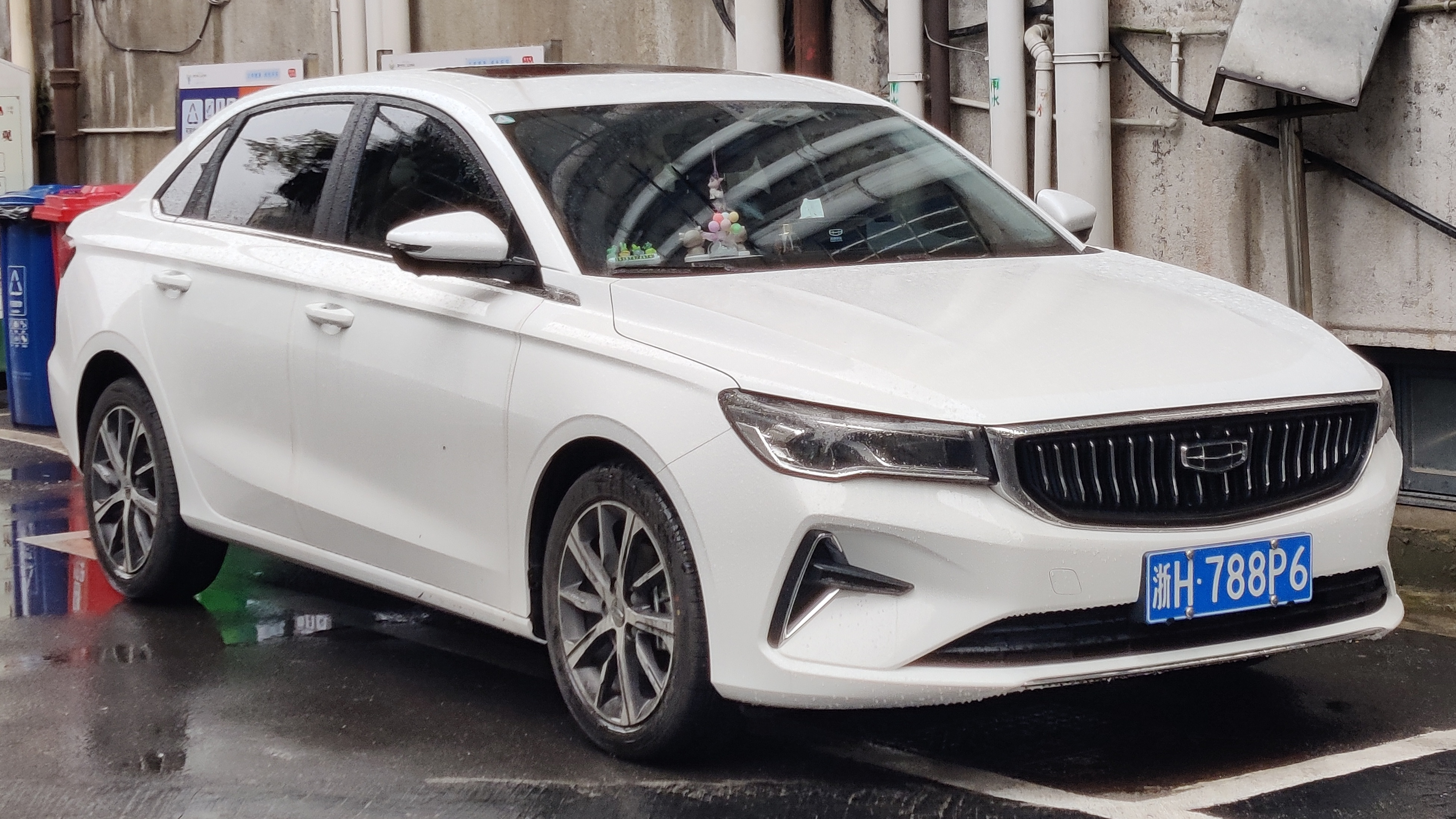

Overview
- Model code: SS11
- Also called: Proton S70 (Malaysia); BelGee S50 (Belarus)
- Production: 2021–present; 2023–present (S70)
- Assembly: China: Huzhou, Zhejiang; Malaysia: Proton City, Tanjung Malim, Perak (PTMSB, S70); Egypt: 6th of October (city)

Body and chassis
- Platform: BMA platform

Powertrain
- Engine: Petrol (Malaysia): 1.5 L JLH-3G15T PFI I3 turbo (S70, 2023–2025); 1.5 L BHE15-EFZ GDI I4 turbo (S70, 2025–present); 1.5 L BHE15-AFD GDI I4 (S70, 2025–present); Petrol (China): 1.5 L JLC-4G15B I4 (China; 2021–2022); 1.5 L BHE15-AFD GDI I4 (China; 2023–2025); 1.5 L BHE15-CFN I4 (China; 2026–present); 1.5 L BHE15-EFZ GDI I4 turbo (China; 2026–present); 1.8 L JLC-4M18H I4 (methanol hybrid) (China; 2022–present)
- Transmission: Malaysia: 6-speed automatic (2025-present); 7-speed dual-clutch (S70); China; 5-speed manual 8-speed CVT; 7-speed dual-clutch (2026–present); 3-speed DHT (menthanol hybrid; 2022–present)

Dimensions
- Wheelbase: 2,650 mm (104.3 in)
- Length: 4,638 mm (182.6 in)
- Width: 1,822 mm (71.7 in)
- Height: 1,460 mm (57.5 in)

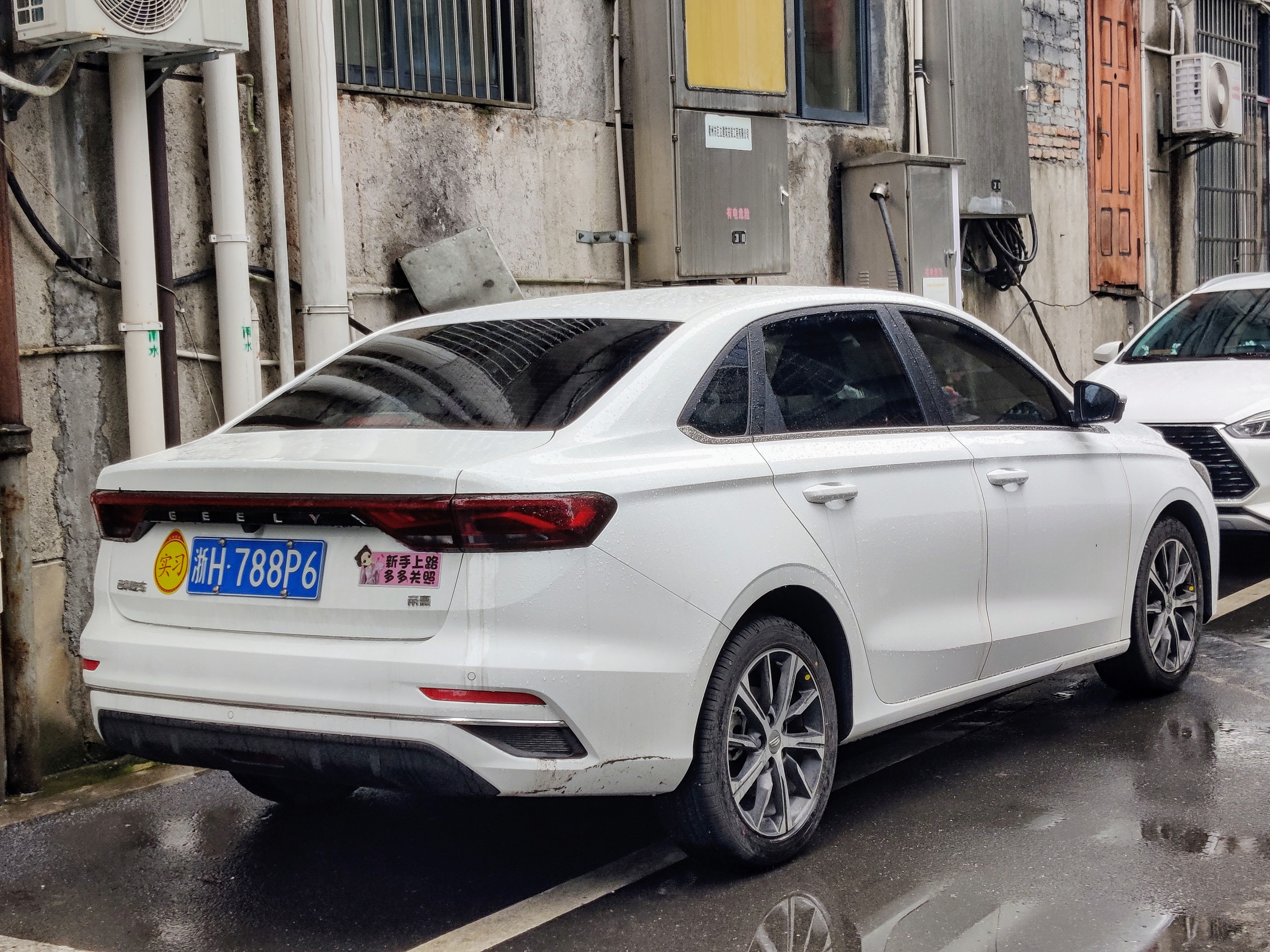
Rear view

News of the fourth-generation Emgrand sedan surfaced in May 2021. The Emgrand was officially launched in China in August that year. Different from previous models, the fourth generation Emgrand is based on a brand new platform and body, with styling in line with the brand's Preface sedan and Xingyue L crossover. Its engine is a JLC-4G15B 1.5-liter naturally aspirated inline-4 engine producing 114 hp (85 kW). The B-segment sedan sits on the brand's BMA platform.

This generation Emgrand is the last generation for the Chinese market to use Geely's 1.5 litre 4G15 engine. All models from 2023 onwards in that market have transitioned to the BHE15-AFD and BHE15-CFN naturally aspirated Volvo engine as standard with the AFD version from 2023 to 2025 producing 120 to 124 horsepower followed by the CFN version for 2026 onwards which was slightly detuned and producing 115 to 118 horsepower, both also 1.5 litre powertrains. As with tradition of the Emgrand in China, these engines are mated to either a five-speed manual or a CVT. For 2026, the BHE15-EFZ turbo engine and 7 speed DCT became available.

At the 2021 Chengdu Motor Show, Geely teased the arrival of the Emgrand L, with the brand's latest design language taken from the Vision Starburst concept.

=== 2025 facelift ===
The Geely Emgrand received a facelift for the 2025 model year, It uses the same four-cylinder 1,500cc naturally aspirated engine and is mated to a six-speed automatic transmission, which produces 122 horsepower and 180 Nm of torque, The average fuel consumption is 5.8 liters per 100 km.

The facelifted Geely Emgrand 2025 was unveiled in the Egyptian market on January 15, 2025, and is produced by the Bavarian company's factory in 6 October City, which is the second factory to produce Geely cars in the Middle East and Africa after Ghabour Auto (GB Auto) that produced the first generation of the Geely Emgrand EC7 starting from 2013 to 2019 producing more than 150,000 vehicles.

=== Methanol hybrid version ===
In 2022, Geely launched the methanol hybrid version of its fourth-generation model, primarily for commercial taxi fleets, initially deployed in Guiyang, Guizhou Province. Geely claimed it as the world's first methanol hybrid electric sedan. It is equipped with the model JLC-4M18H methanol/electric hybrid engine, delivering a maximum power of 132 horsepower (97 kW). Geely promotes it as having a methanol consumption as low as 9.2 liters per 100 kilometers, with a travel cost of less than 0.3 RMB per kilometer. It is also paired to a newly introduced transmission option known as DHT (Dedicated Hybrid transmission).

=== Proton S70 ===

Proton Holdings has rebadged rebadged and re-engineered the Geely Emgrand as the Proton S70 for the Malaysian market. The model was launched on 28 November 2023 and initially featured a 1.5-litre turbocharged three-cylinder engine paired with a seven-speed dual-clutch transmission (DCT). This 1.5 litre turbocharged three-cylinder remained a Malaysia-exclusive and was not offered in Emgrand models in China. The S70 also featured an expanded suite of advanced driver assistance systems (ADAS), achieving a five-star ASEAN NCAP safety rating.

Four variants were initially offered: Executive, Premium, Flagship and Flagship X. In 2026, the model received the MC1 update, which introduced a 1.5-litre turbocharged four-cylinder engine. Later in 2026, Proton expanded the range with the naturally aspirated S70 Lite and S70 Prime variants.

== Fifth generation (SS21; 2025) ==
Fifth generation
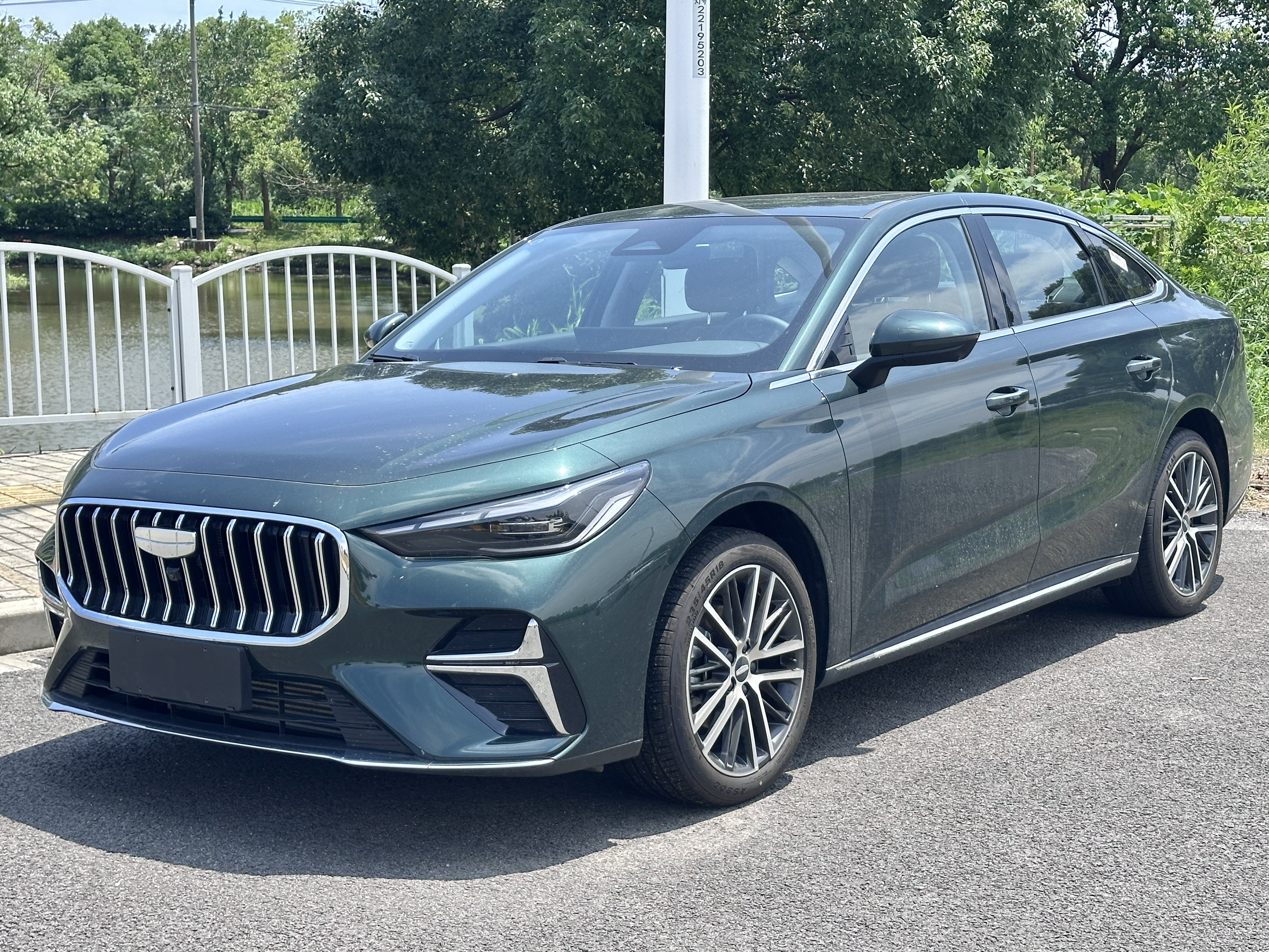

Overview
- Model code: SS21
- Production: 2025–present
- Model years: 2026–present

Body and chassis
- Platform: Geely BMA platform
- Related: Geely Galaxy Starshine 6

Powertrain
- Engine: 1.5 L BHE15-BFN I4 (hybrid petrol); 1.5 L BHE15-CFN GDI I4 (petrol); 1.5 L BHE15-EFZ I4 (turbocharged petrol)
- Electric motor: One 140 kW (188 hp; 190 PS)
- Transmission: 1 speed DHT (hybrid); 7 speed DCT (1.5 T); 8 speed CVT (1.5 GDI)
- Battery: 18.4 kWh LFP

Dimensions
- Wheelbase: 2,755 mm (108.5 in)
- Length: 4,815 mm (189.6 in)
- Width: 1,855 mm (73.0 in)
- Height: 1,480 mm (58.3 in)

The fifth-generation Emgrand sedan was unveiled on 11 October 2025. It is powered by a 1.5-litre turbocharged inline-four engine producing 133 kW (178 hp) and 290 N⋅m of torque. alongside the naturally aspirated version, which were both carried over from the previous generation Emgrand available as standard. A new hybrid powertrain was introduced. Each engine is paired with a solo transmission option; the 1 speed DHT for hybrid models, the unchanged 7 speed DCT for the turbocharged powertrain, and the 8 speed CVT for naturally aspirated petrol models. This is the first Emgrand generation to not have a manual transmission option.

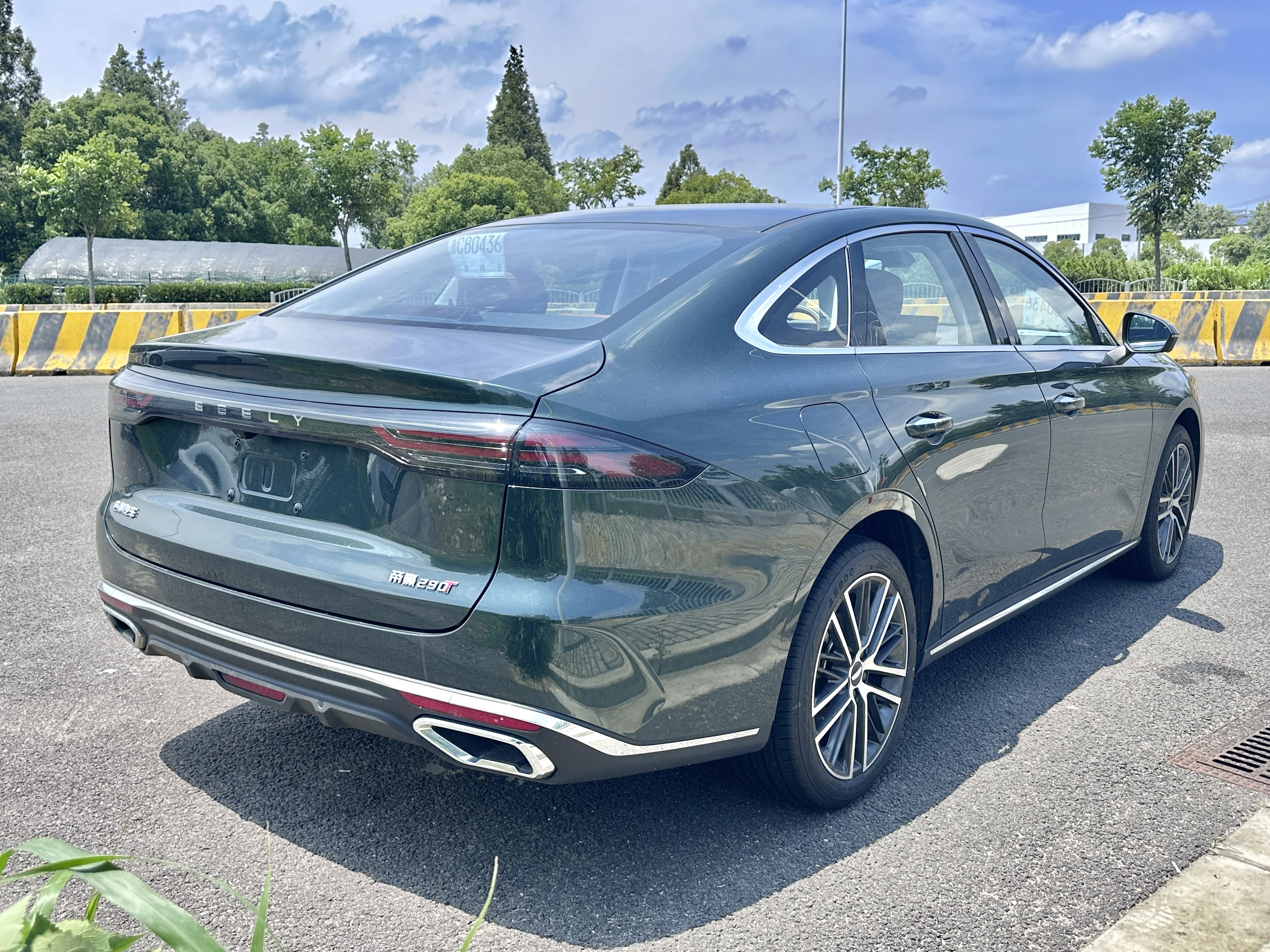
Rear view

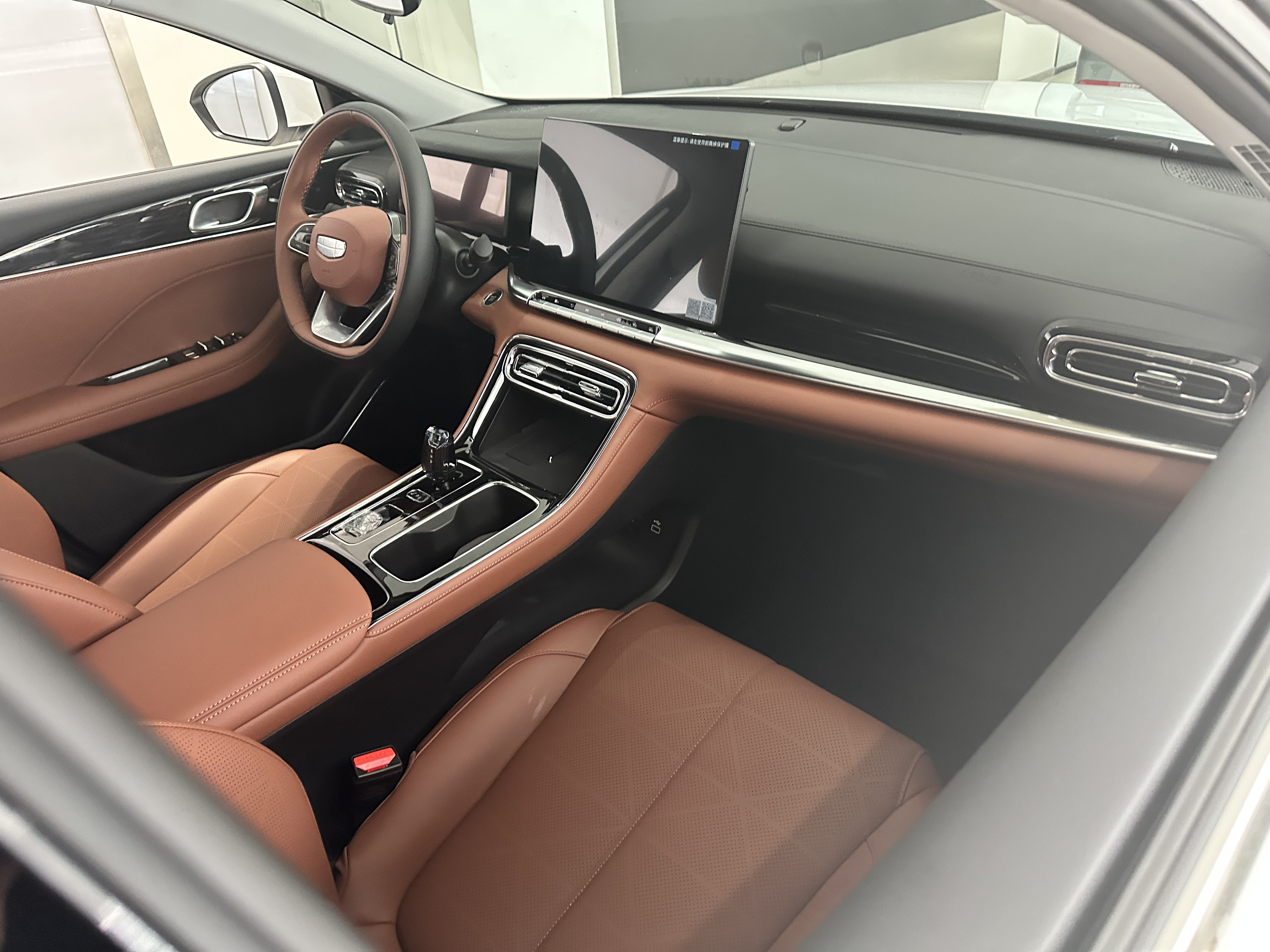
Interior

== Sales ==
Year	China			Mexico
Year	Emgrand	Emgrand & GL	EV	Mexico
2020		223,369	9,693	
2021		183,491	25,918	
2022		159,920	28,100	
2023	139,327	176,772	14,112	
2024	124,393	176,792	3,330	878
2025	105,009		241	11,973
