= Geely Yuanjing S1 =

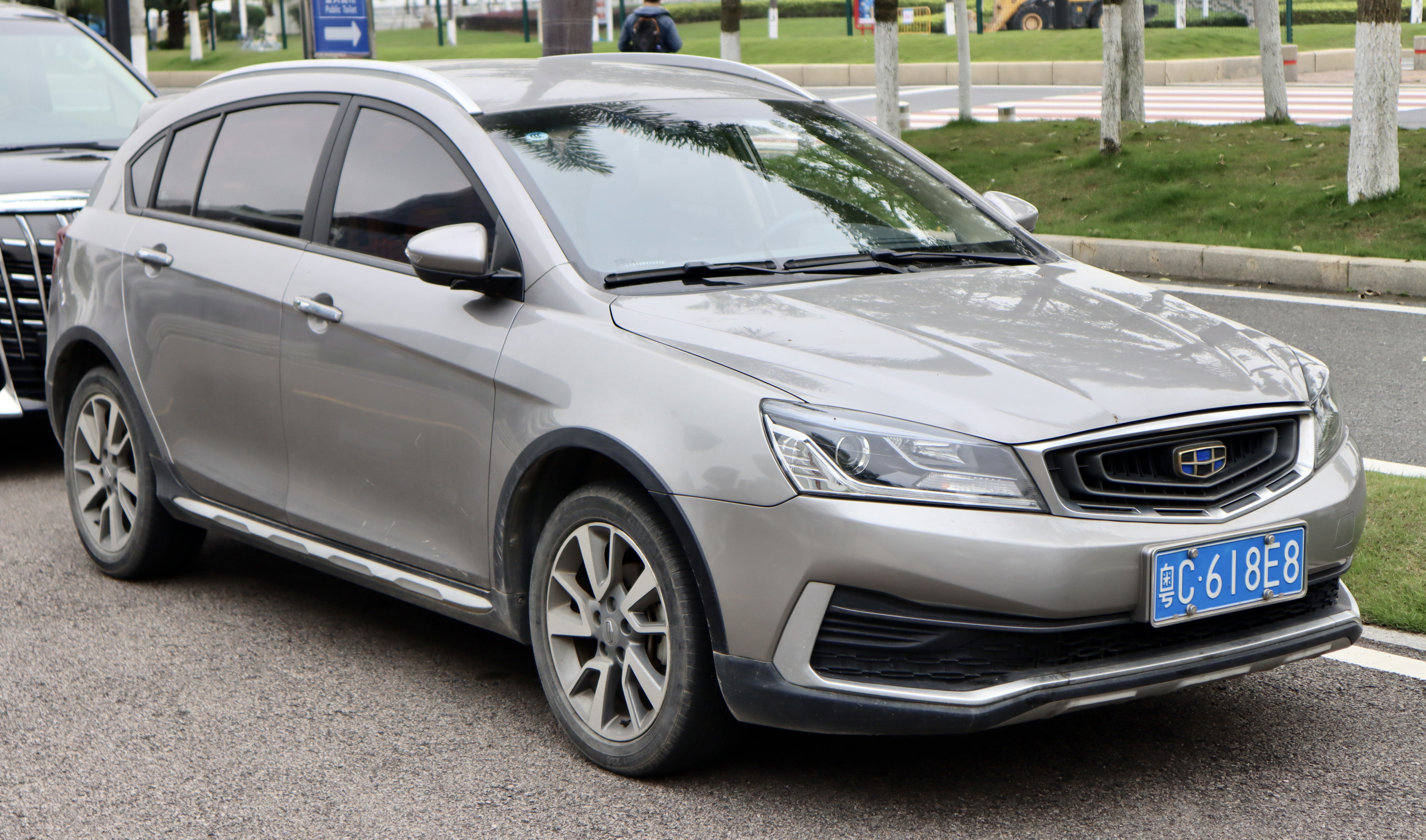
- Geely Yuanjing S1

Overview
- Manufacturer: Geely Auto
- Production: 2017–2019
- Model years: 2018–2019
- Assembly: Ningbo, Zhejiang, China

Body and chassis
- Class: Compact crossover SUV (C)
- Body style: 5-door hatchback
- Layout: Front-engine, front-wheel-drive
- Related: Geely Emgrand sedan

Powertrain
- Engine: 1.4 L 4G14 I4 (turbo petrol); 1.5 L 4G15 I4 (petrol)
- Transmission: 6-speed manual 5-speed manual CVT

Dimensions
- Wheelbase: 2,668 mm (105.0 in)
- Length: 4,465 mm (175.8 in)
- Width: 1,800 mm (70.9 in)
- Height: 1,535 mm (60.4 in)

Chronology
- Predecessor: Emgrand EC7-RV

The Geely Yuanjing S1 is a compact crossover SUV produced by Geely Auto under the Emgrand product line, positioning the Yuanjing S1 just above the Geely Yuanjing X3 subcompact crossover. The Geely Yuanjing S1 is essentially a heavily facelifted Emgrand EC7-RV hatchback.

== Overview ==
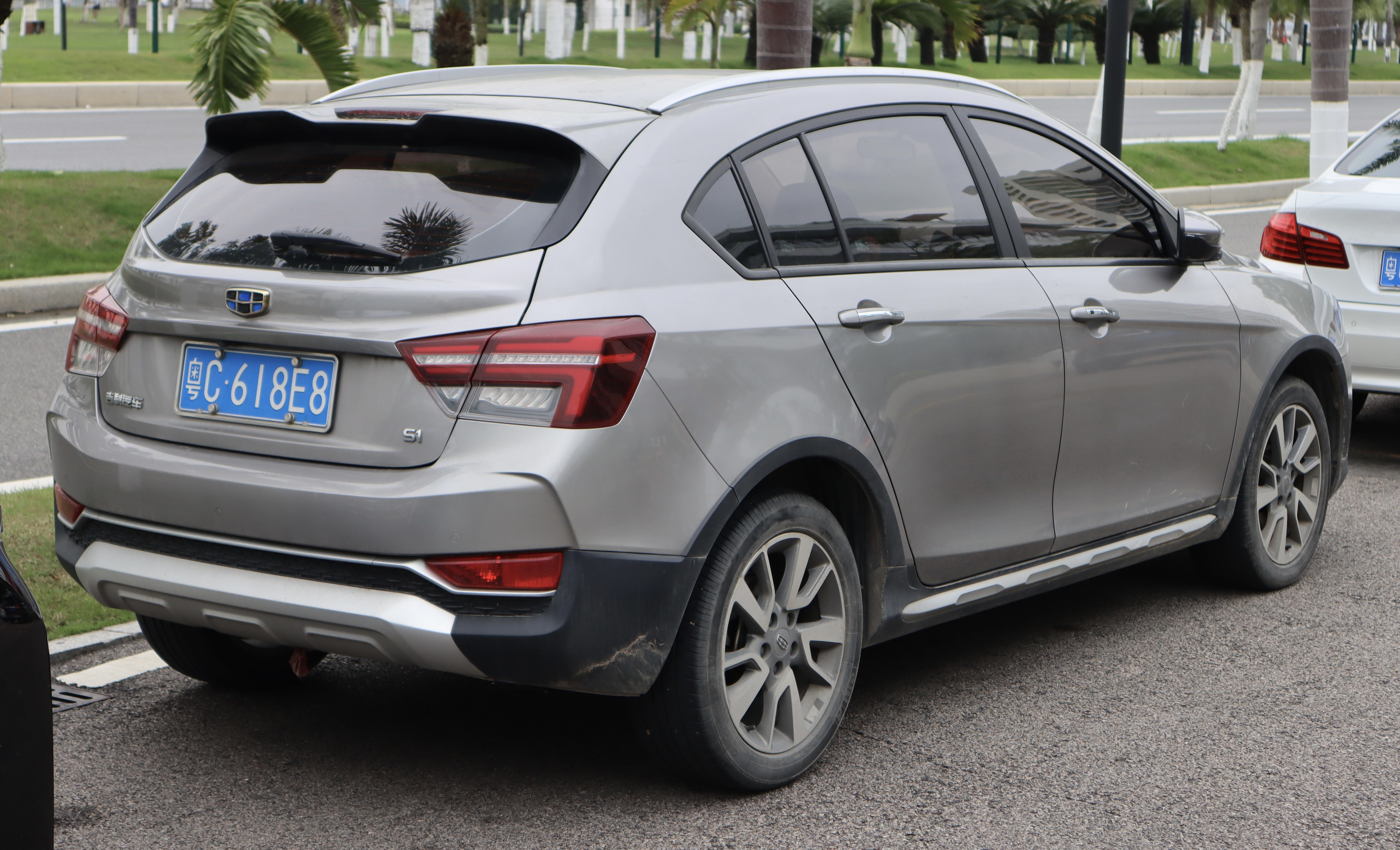
Rear

Originally the launch vehicle for Emgrand (Chinese: 帝豪品牌; pinyin: dì háo pǐnpái), the medium to high-end luxury brand of Geely that was launched in July 2009, the product was repositioned after the facelift. After the discontinuation of the "Emgrand" brand, the Emgrand name became a series of products under the Geely brand, and the Emgrand logo became Geely's new logo. The predecessing Emgrand EC7 hatchback (EC7-RV) went through a heavy facelift and gained plastic caddling to create the crossover-inspired look and was renamed to Yuanjing S1 to be repositioned under the Yuanjing product line while its sedan counterpart, the Geely Emgrand sedan remained to stay as part of the Emgrand product line.

At launch in July 2017, the Geely Vision S1 is available with a 103hp 1.5-litre engine and a 133hp 1.4-litre turbocharged engine.

As of June 2019, the updated Geely Vision S1 (Yuanjing S1) carries a 1.4-litre turbocharged engine satisfying the Chinese National Standard 6 Emissions Standard. The updated Geely Vision S1 features an additional Sports mode, and the entire lineup comes standard with the TPMS and the upgraded GKUI (Geely Smart Ecosystem). Additional features such as power adjustment, electrical heating and LED indictors have been integrated into the outside rear-view mirrors.
