= Geely CK =

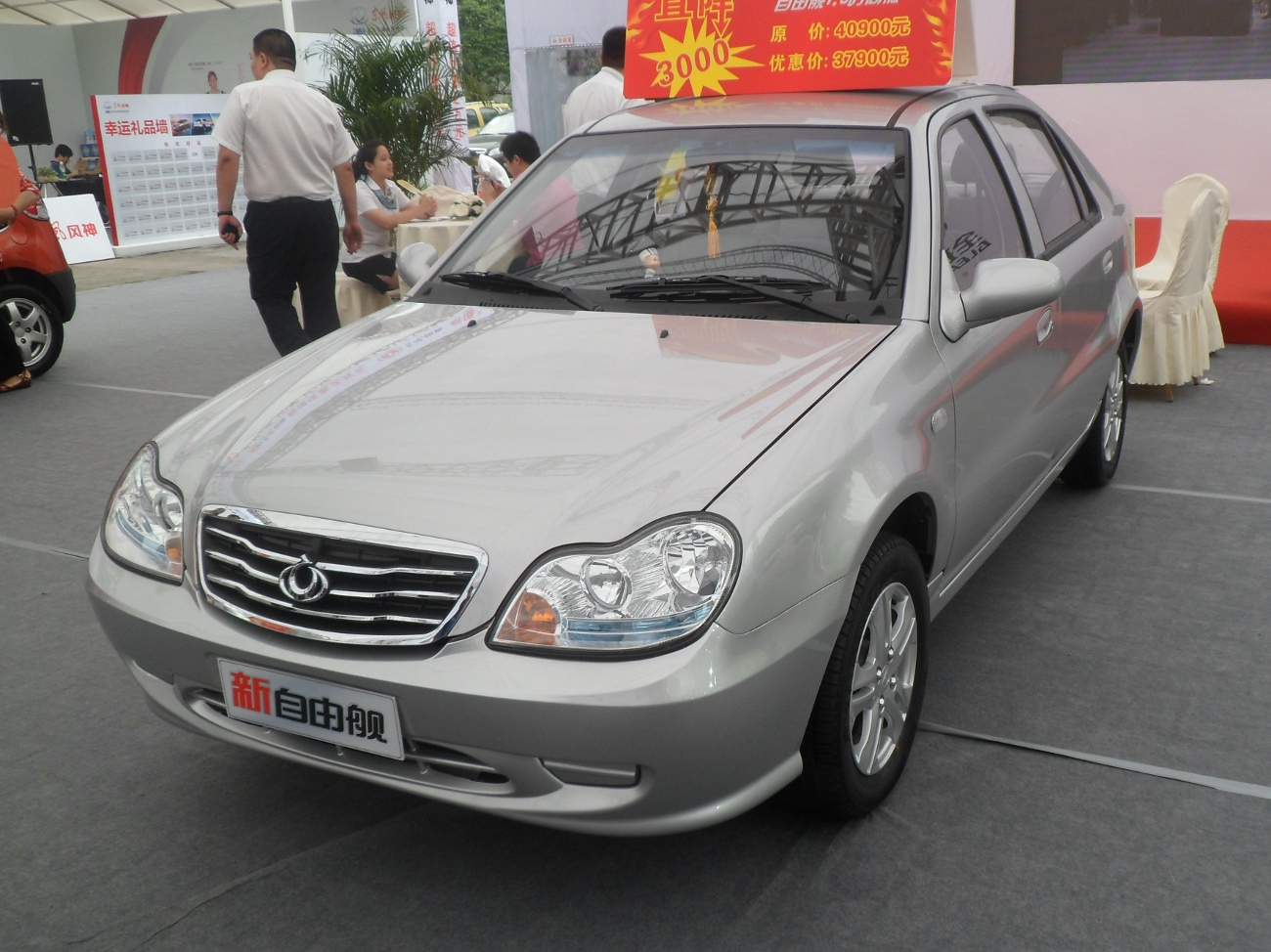
- Gleagle CK sedan

Overview
- Manufacturer: Geely Auto
- Also called: Geely Otaka (Russia); Geely Echo (Turkey); Gleagle CK (China); Geely Free Cruiser (China); Geely Freedom Cruiser; Geely Ziyoujian; Gleagle Ziyoujian; Shanghai Englon SC3
- Production: 2005–2016
- Assembly: China: Zhejiang (Zhejiang Geely Holding Group Co., Ltd); Ukraine: Kremenchuk (KrASZ); Uruguay: Montevideo (Nordex); Russia: Novouralsk (Amur: 2007–2008)

Body and chassis
- Class: Subcompact car (B)
- Body style: 4-door sedan
- Layout: FF layout

Powertrain
- Engine: petrol: 1.0 L I3; 1.3 L MR479Q I4; 1.5 L MR479QA I4; 1.6 L MR481QA I4
- Transmission: 5-speed manual; 4 speed automatic

Dimensions
- Wheelbase: 2,434 mm (95.8 in)
- Length: 4,152 mm (163.5 in)
- Width: 1,680 mm (66.1 in)
- Height: 1,440 mm (56.7 in)
- Curb weight: 1,042 kg (2,297 lb)

Chronology
- Successor: Geely MK

The Geely CK is a subcompact sedan produced by the Chinese manufacturer Geely Auto from May 2005 to January 2016. The CK's Chinese name, Ziyoujian, stands for "Freedom Ship" or "Free Cruiser". It was sold as the Geely Otaka on the Russian market in 2007–2008. The car was also sold as the Gleagle CK in the Chinese domestic market, part of Geely's recent proliferation of brands.

== Overview ==
When the CK was shown at the Detroit Auto Show, it had the distinction of being the first Chinese automobile ever displayed at an American auto show, although it was only shown to the press and not the general public. Geely had planned to begin selling the model in Puerto Rico in 2007 on the way to beginning sales in Mainland America the next year. However, since Geely failed the IIHS and NHTSA safety tests, plans were halted. The CK was also shown at the Frankfurt Motor Show in 2005 along with four other Geely models.

At least 1,500 Geely CKs were shipped to Cuba in 2009, where they would replace some of the many Lada 2105s used by government officials and police. The car is thus becoming a common sight in Cuba. Displacing the old Russian-made Ladas, it is driven by government officials and police and also available to rental car fleets. The specification includes power windows and air conditioning. Still, they have a reputation for being unreliable and many drivers thus prefer the older, Russian-built vehicles.

Its 1.5 L engine is a Toyota Motor Corporation design, also licensed for production by Xiali. It produces 94 hp (70 kW) at 6000 rpm. The 4 speed automatic transmission is built in China, the first to be manufactured there. In 2008, the facelifted CK II was released, with modified headlights and bumpers. The pre-facelift model resembles a W220 S-Class Mercedes-Benz, while the facelift resembles a W203 C-Class.

In the first car safety crash test results issued by the Latin New Car Assessment Programme in 2010, the CK versions without airbags were rated with zero out of four stars for adult occupants, and two out of four stars for child occupants. The press release cited: "Protection for the driver is poor for most body regions. Significant collapse of the body shell during tests." According to the testers, the structure of the car is so bad that even an airbag would not improve the situation.

The CK Work, powered by a 1.3 L (1342 cc) engine producing 85 PS (63 kW), is sold in Colombia for use as a taxi.

The CK was later given a facelift for 2015 and ended production in 2016.

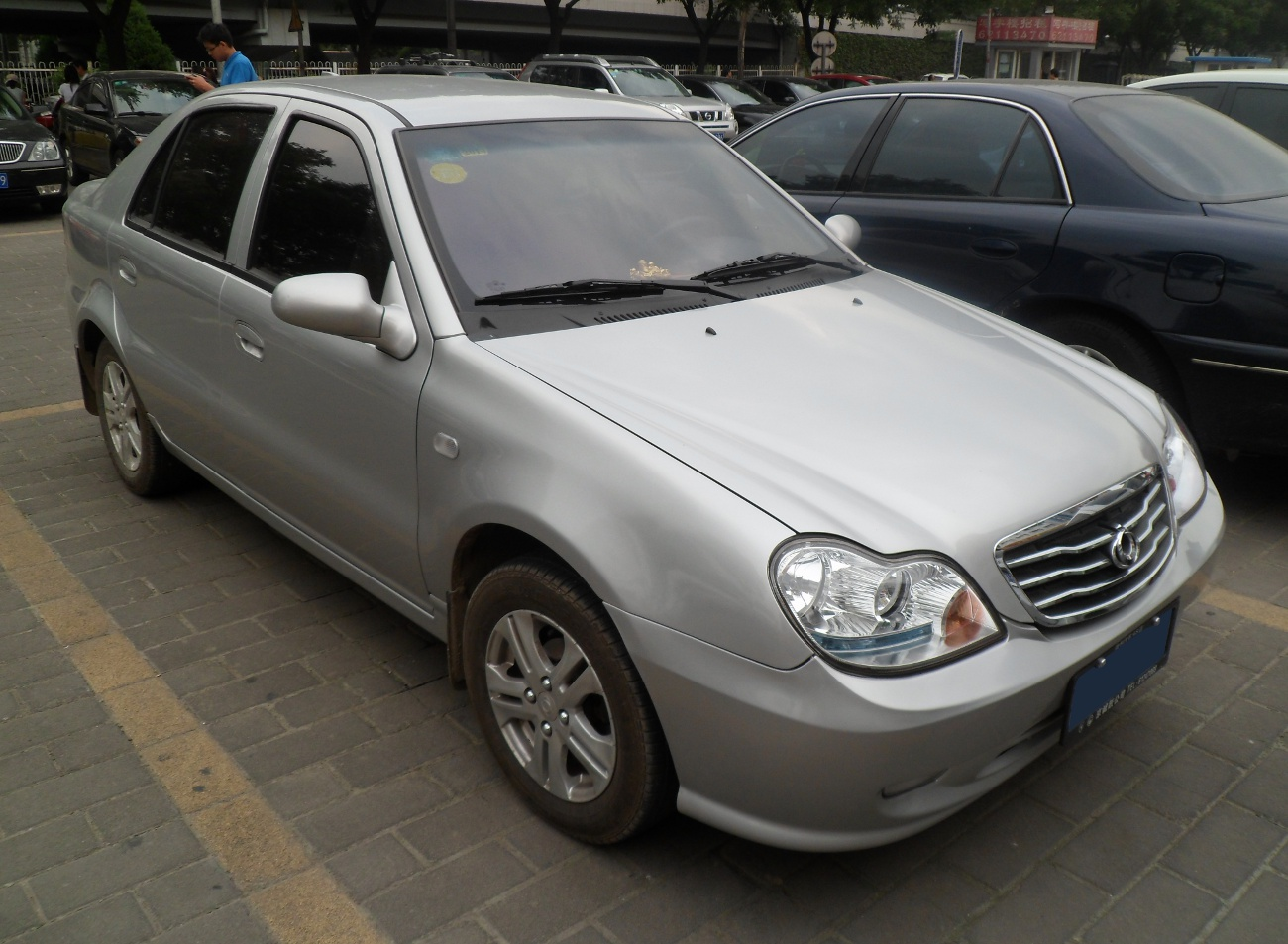
Gleagle CK front.

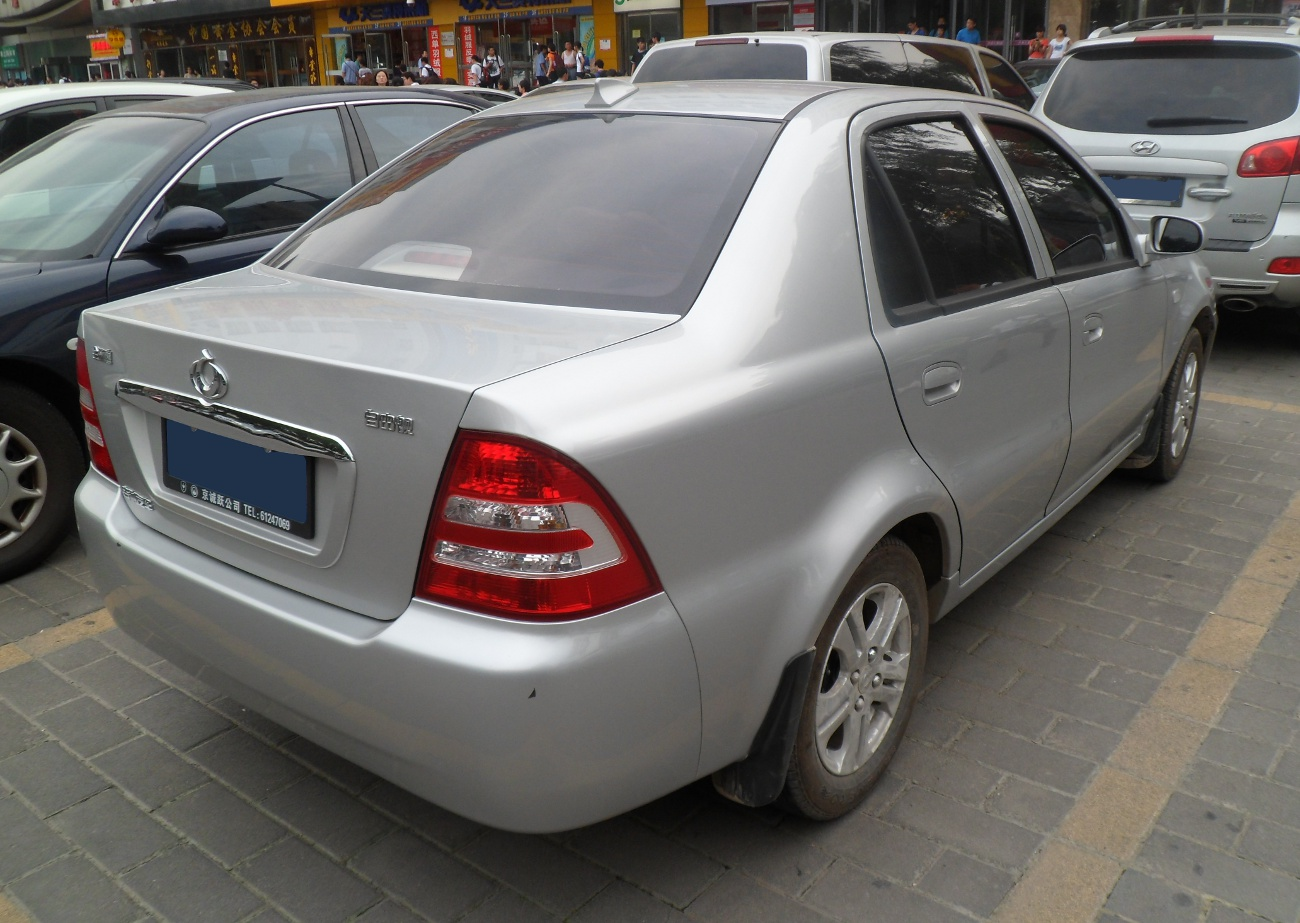
Gleagle CK rear.

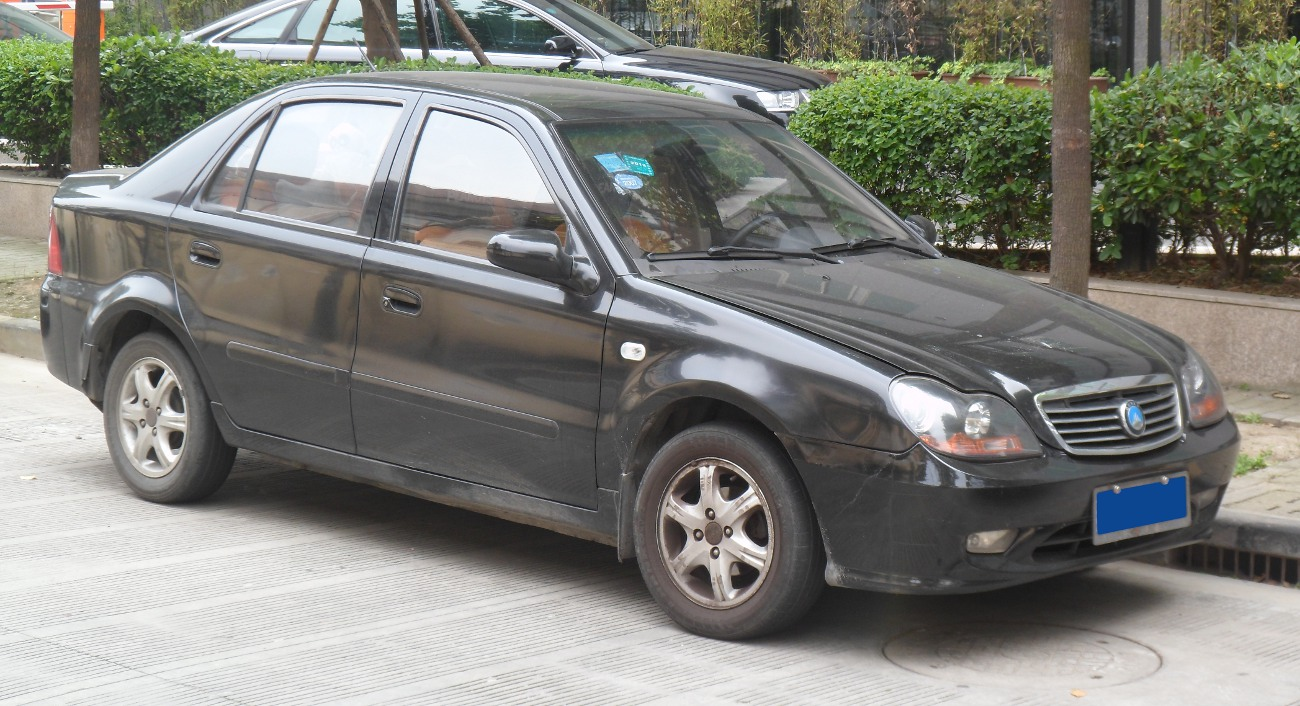
Geely CK front.

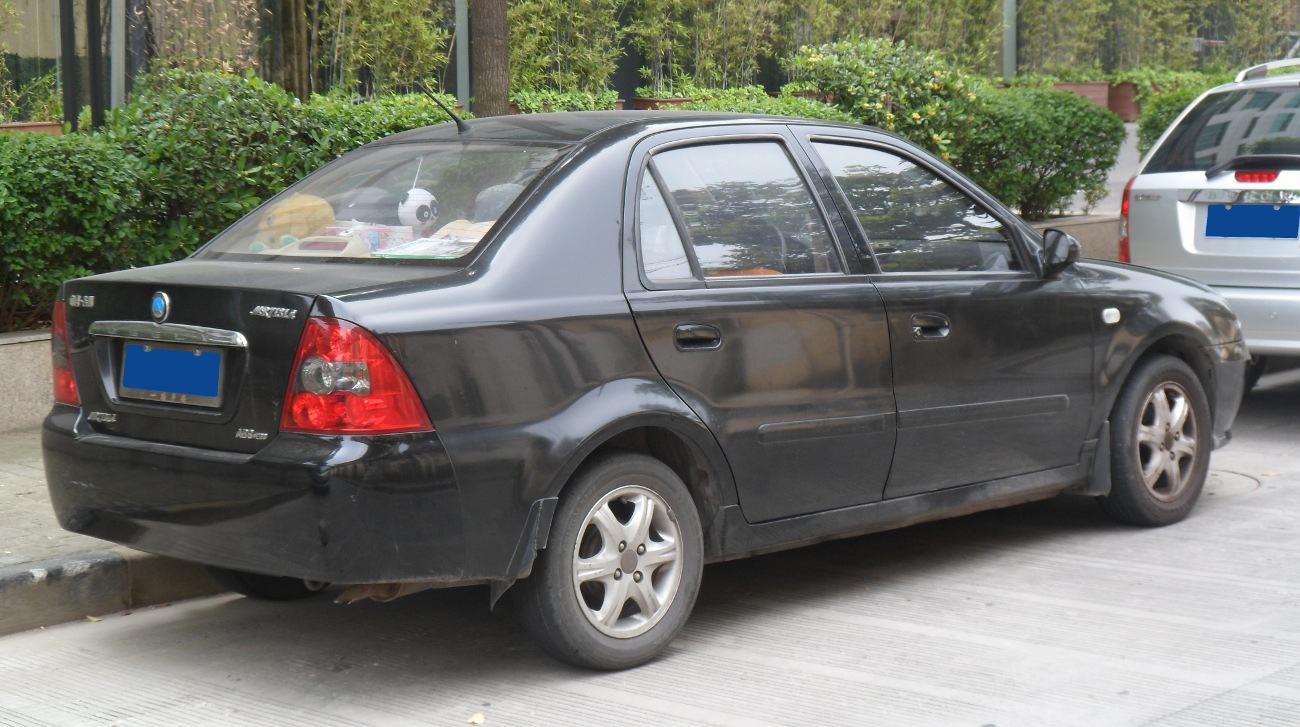
Geely CK rear.

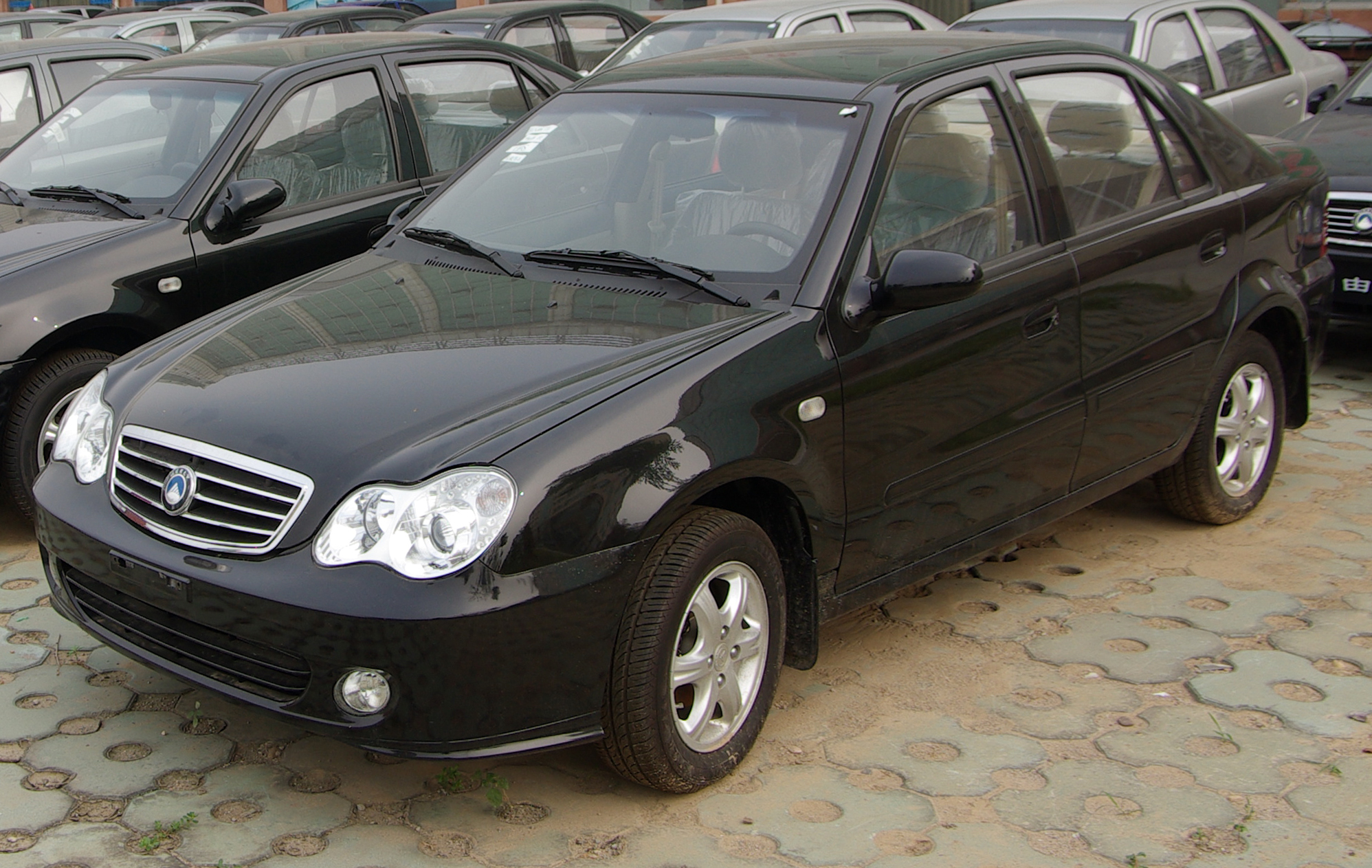
Facelifted Geely CK II.

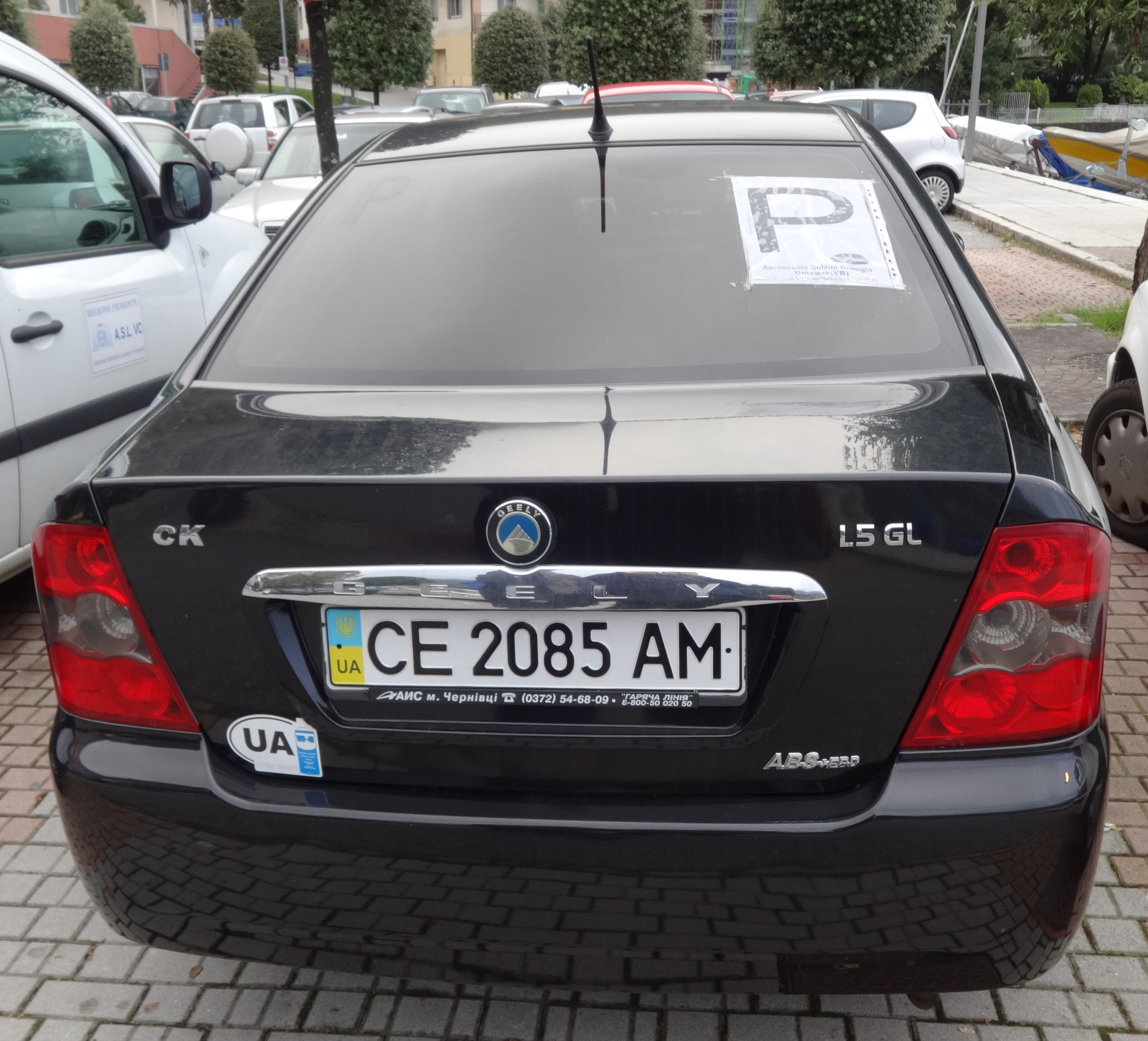
Geely CK rear end.

== Safety ==
The Geely CK 1.3L in its most basic version for Latin America with no airbags received 0 stars for adult occupants and 2 stars for infants from Latin NCAP 1.0 in 2010.

Latin NCAP 1.0 test results Geely CK 1 1.3 - NO Airbags (2010, based on Euro NCAP 1997)
Test	Points	Stars
Adult occupant:	1.06/17.0	0 /5 stars
Child occupant:	20.37/49.00	2 /5 stars
