= Derways Automobile Company =

Former Russian automaker

- Native name: ООО Автомобильная компания «Дервэйс»
- Company type: PLC private company
- Industry: Automotive
- Founded: 2003; 23 years ago
- Headquarters: Cherkessk, Karachay-Cherkessia, Russia
- Products: Automobiles
- Number of employees: 3,000
- Parent: Merkuriy
- Website: derways.ru

The Derways Automobile Company (ООО Автомобильная компания ДЕРВЕЙС, Avtomobil'naya kompaniya DERVEYS) was a Russian automaker located in Cherkessk, Karachay-Cherkessia. Founded in 2003, it was Russia's first private car manufacturer and a part of the Russian Mercury Group. Since June 2007, the company has been producing 100,000 units annually for the local market in a joint venture with the Chinese firms Lifan Group and Liaoning SG Automotive Group Co., Ltd. Derways' second plant was opened in the fall of 2009. The company employed around 3,000 workers.

== Name ==
The name "Derways" is composed of two parts: "Der," derived from the surname of the founders (the Dereva brothers), and "ways," from the English word "roads."

== History ==
- 2003 - Assembly of the prototype SUV Derways "Cowboy" (Derways 3131), which was first exhibited at the "Russian International Motor Show" in Moscow. The car was built on a Romanian ARO chassis, and later, Chinese chassis were used. The "Cowboy" passed all tests at the NAMI test site and received certification.
- 2004 - The opening of the plant and the start of mass production. By the end of the year, the plant reached a production level of 5,000 vehicles annually.
- 2006 - Production of the Derways "Cowboy" was suspended due to the bankruptcy of ARO. The company then began localizing Chinese cars, including the Derways-313120/313121 Shuttle (320 units produced), Derways-313150 Aurora (351 units produced), Derways-313130 Land Crown (a copy of the Toyota Land Cruiser 90, 33 units produced), and Derways-313140 Saladin (a copy of a Nissan model from Zhengzhou, 38 units produced). A total of 788 cars were produced that year.
- 2007 - Production of the Derways-233300 Plutus pickup truck began, a copy of the Chevrolet Colorado. A trilateral agreement was signed with Lifan and the Avtomir group for assembling SKD kits, with plans to transition to a full SKD production of at least 25,000 vehicles per year starting in 2009. The plant also began assembling Lifan Breez cars.
- 2009 - Full-cycle production began, including welding, body painting, and complete assembly of Lifan-7131A/7161A Breez hatchbacks, carried out at the Derways-1 plant.
- 2010 - In the autumn, an additional production line with a capacity of 25,000 vehicles per year was launched. The production of Haima 3 cars, from the Chinese company Hainan Mazda, commenced. Plans were made to produce 900 Haima 3 sedans and hatchbacks by the end of the year.
- 2011 - The Haima 2, based on the Mazda 2, went into production at the beginning of the year.
- 2015 - Due to a decline in sales of Chinese cars, production was reduced by half.
- 2018 - The plant closed, and the equipment was dismantled.

== Owners ==
In November 2010, 51% of the shares of the Circassian automobile plant Derways were transferred to Sberbank of Russia due to the company's high debt.

As of February 2016, the shareholders of the company were Derev Hadzhi-Murat (President of the company, holding 44% of the shares) and Romanov Alexander (Vice President, holding 5%).

By 2019, Derev owned 44% of the company, Romanov held 5%, and Sberbank of Russia owned 51%.

== Production ==
Initially, the company produced cars of its own design and later assembled vehicles from Chinese manufacturers such as Lifan, Chery, Geely, Brilliance, JAC, and Hawtai.

=== Derways models ===
- Derways Cowboy (2004–2007, original based on ARO chassis) 313101, Derways 313102, Derways 313105.
- Derways 313120 (based on the Dadi Shuttle BDD6491E)

=== Chinese models ===
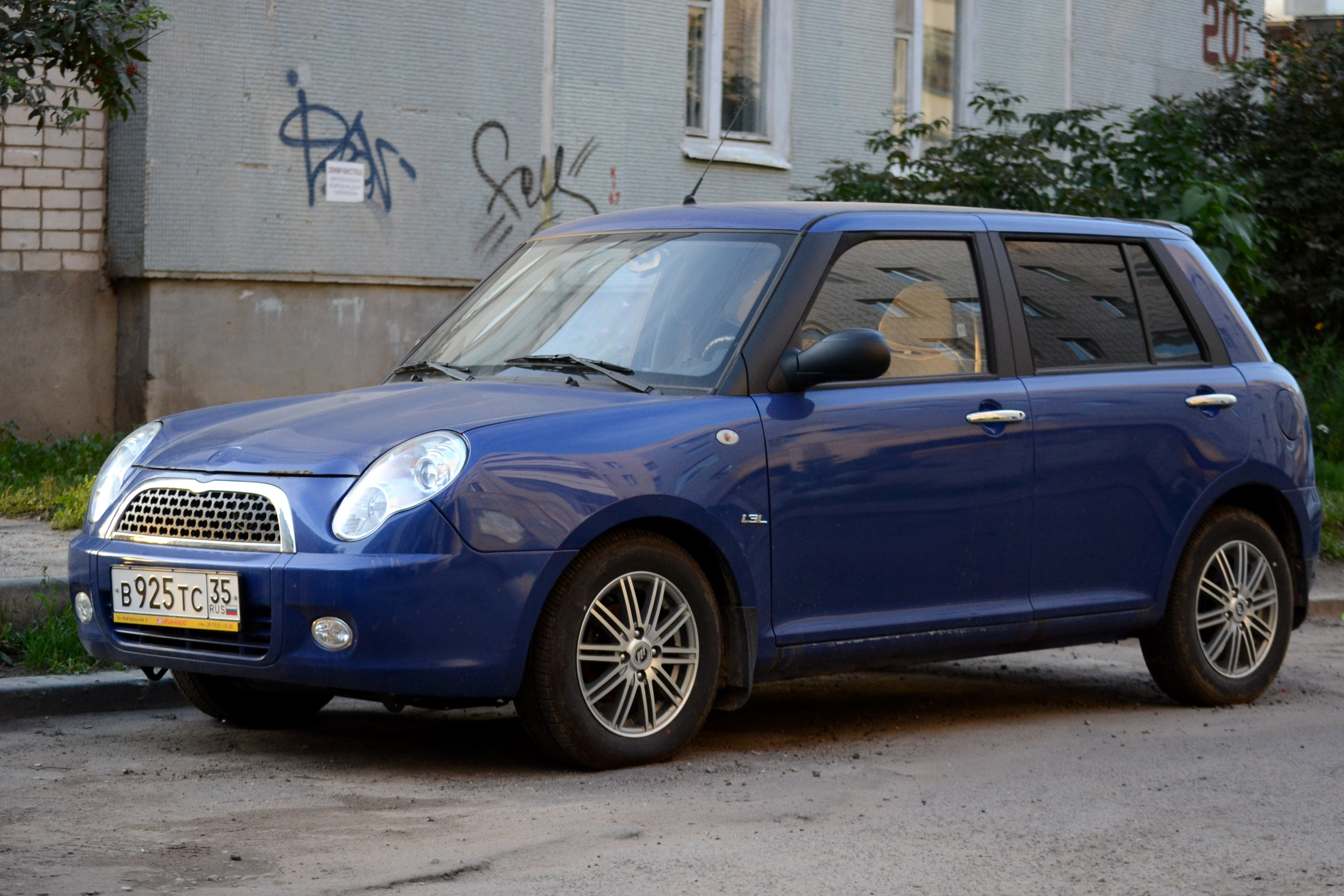
Derways assembled Lifan 320

- Derways Land Crown (since 2006, a rebadged Chinese copy version of the Toyota Land Cruiser Prado 90 Series)
- Derways Aurora (since 2006, rebadged Huanghai Aurora)
- Derways Shuttle (since 2006, rebadged Dadi Shuttle/Gonow Jetstar/Huanghai Challenger)
- Derways Antelope (since 2007, a rebadged Gonow FAN/Troy)
- Derways Plutus (since 2007, Pickup; a rebadged Huanghai Plutus, a copy of the Ssangyong Rexton)
- Geely MK Cross (2011–present)
- Geely Emgrand (2012–present)
- Great Wall Hover (2010–present)
- Lifan Smily (since 2007)
- Lifan Solano (since 2007)
- Lifan Breeze (2007–2012)
- Derways Saladin (since 2008, a rebadged version of the Nissan Paladin/Roniz)
- Geely MK (2010–2018)

== See also ==
- TagAZ, a similar but now defunct Russian company.
