= Lifan 320 =

Chinese supermini car

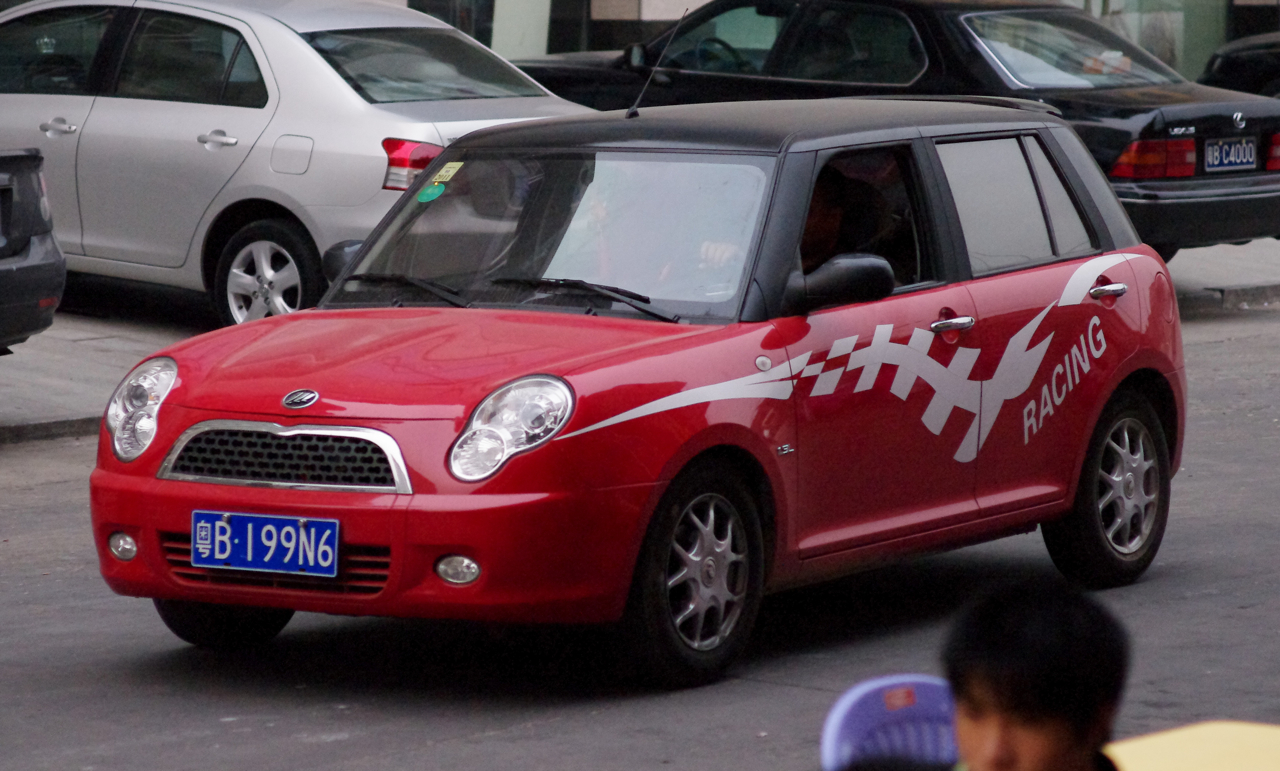

Overview
- Manufacturer: Lifan
- Also called: Lifan 330; Lifan Smily (Russia)
- Production: 2008–2018 (China); 2011–2018 (Russia)
- Model years: 2009–2018
- Assembly: China: Chongqing; Russia: Cherkessk (Derways); Azerbaijan: Nakhchivan (NAZ); Uruguay: San José

Body and chassis
- Class: Supermini
- Body style: 5-door hatchback
- Related: Mini Hatch

Powertrain
- Engine: 1.3 L LF479Q3 I4 (petrol)
- Transmission: 5-speed manual CVT

Dimensions
- Wheelbase: 2,340 mm (92 in)
- Length: 3,745 mm (147.4 in)
- Width: 1,620 mm (64 in)
- Height: 1,430 mm (56 in)

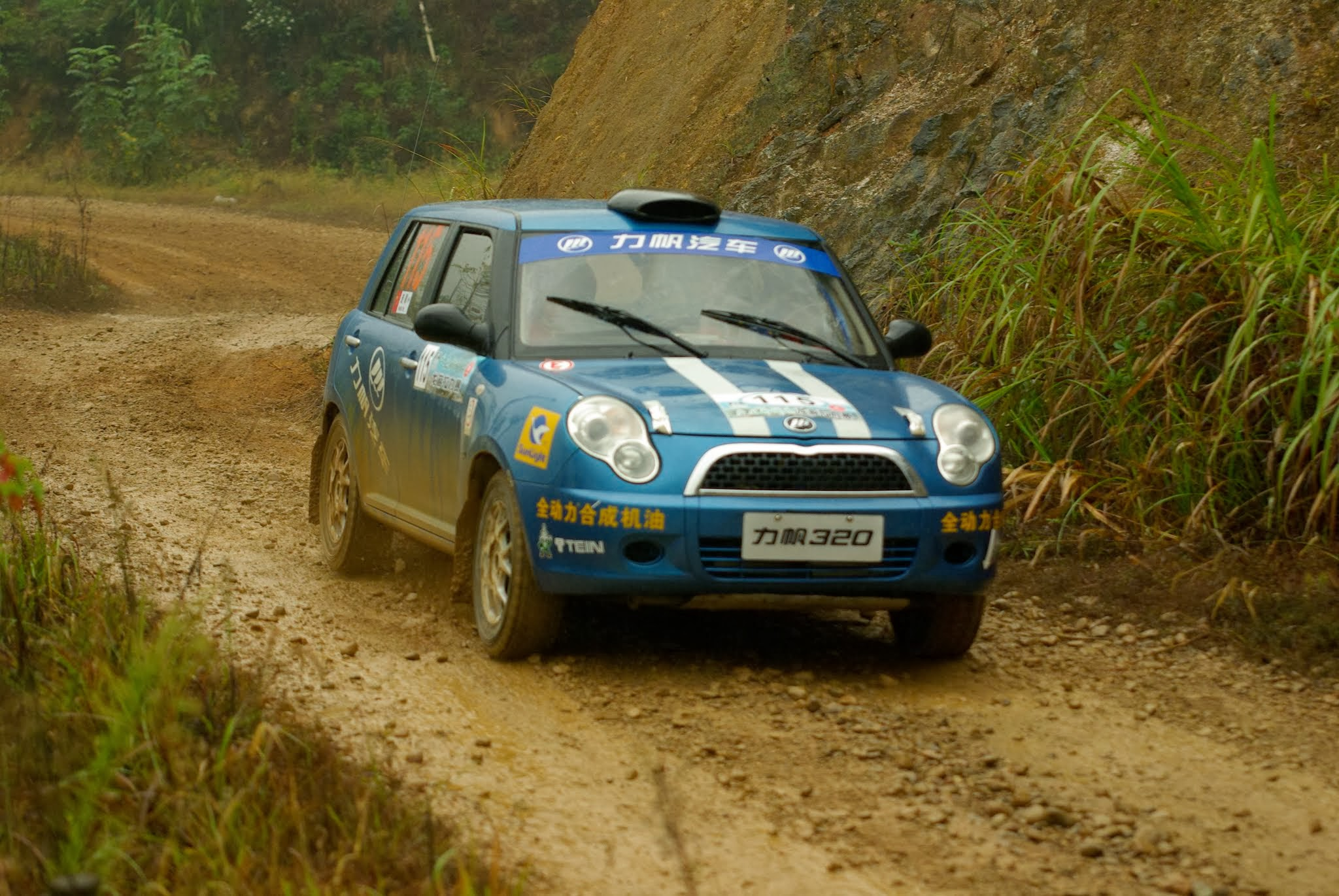
A Lifan 320 during the 2013 China Rally

The Lifan 320 is a supermini made by Lifan Group. Sales began in 2009, and a facelift was conducted in 2013. A more upmarket variant called the Lifan 330 was also available from 2013. The Lifan 320 was also produced and sold in foreign markets and was sold in Russia as the Lifan Smily.

== Overview ==
The 320 was first shown at the 2008 Beijing Auto Show, and then the 320 prototype was shown again during the 2009 Shanghai Auto Show. The Lifan 320 offers four body colors for customers and will be sold at 48,800 yuan (US$7,142) in Chinese market.

As of May 2008, the Lifan 320 team was founded and participated in the China Rally Championship (CRC). Lifan planned to use the "Race first and sell later." strategy to strengthen the durability of the vehicles.

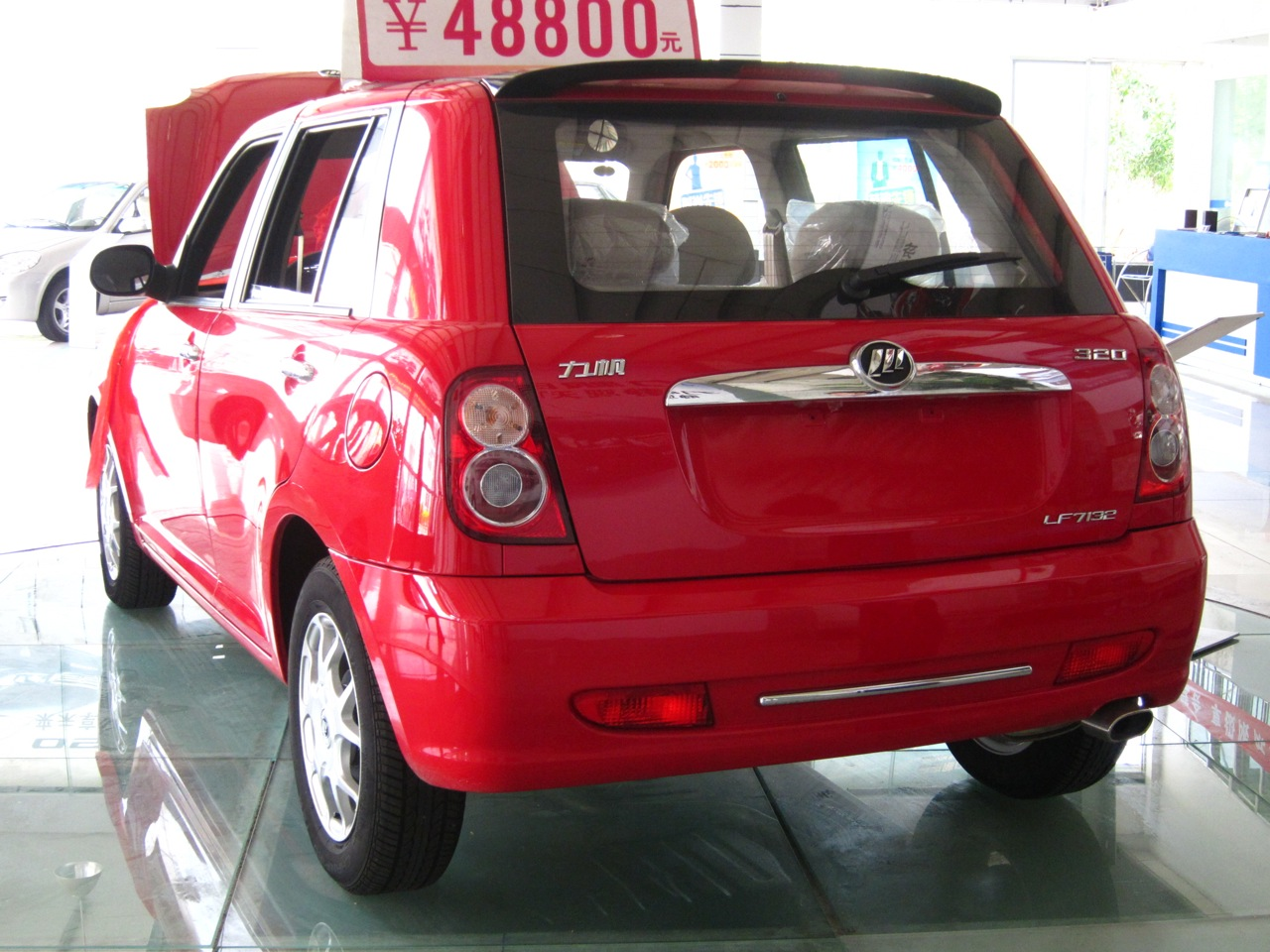
2010 Lifan 320 rear quarter

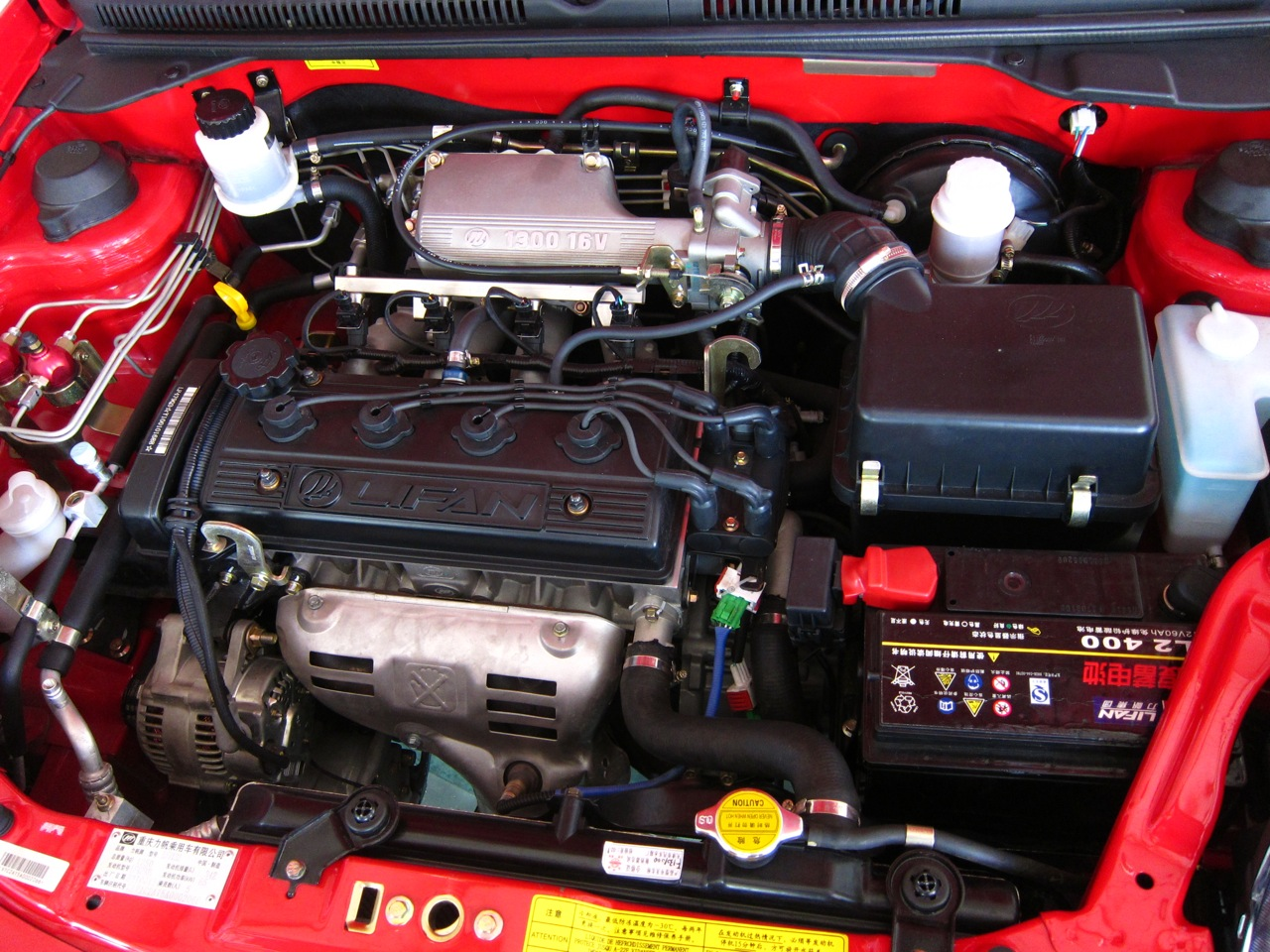
2010 Lifan 320 1.3L 16V engine

== 2013 model year and 330 ==
The facelifted model was revealed in 2013 along with a more upmarket version, the 330. The 330 features a completely redesigned front end and sold alongside the original 320.

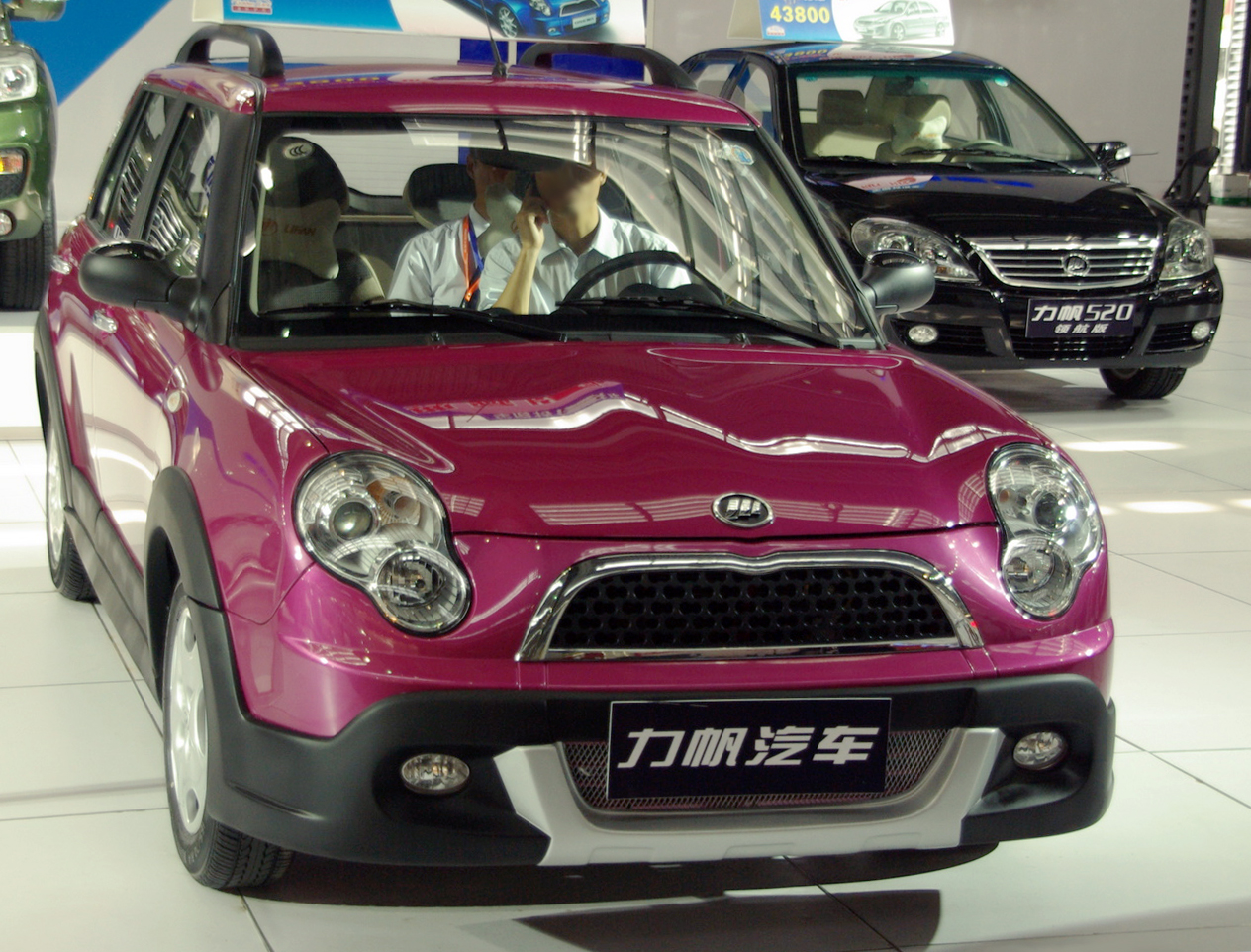
Facelifted model in 2013

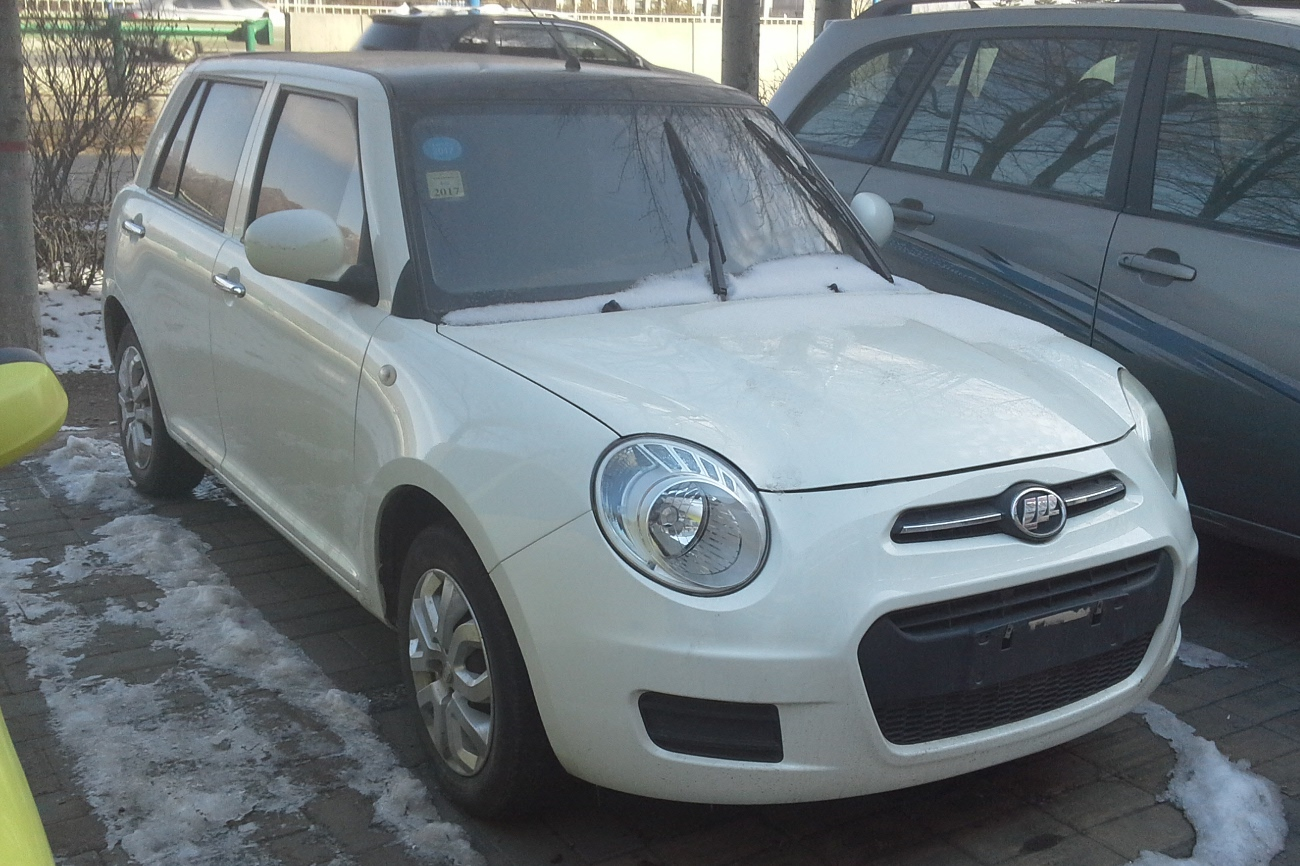
Lifan 330

== Powertrain ==
The power of the 320 and 330 comes from a 1.3-litre engine similar to the one in the Mini Cooper developing 90hp and 115nm. The engine is mated to a 5-speed manual transmission or CVT.

== Markets ==
The Lifan 320 is sold in China in and several export markets including Peru, and Russia, where it is known as the Lifan Smily. The 320 has been assembled in Cherkessk by Derways Automobile Company since 2011.

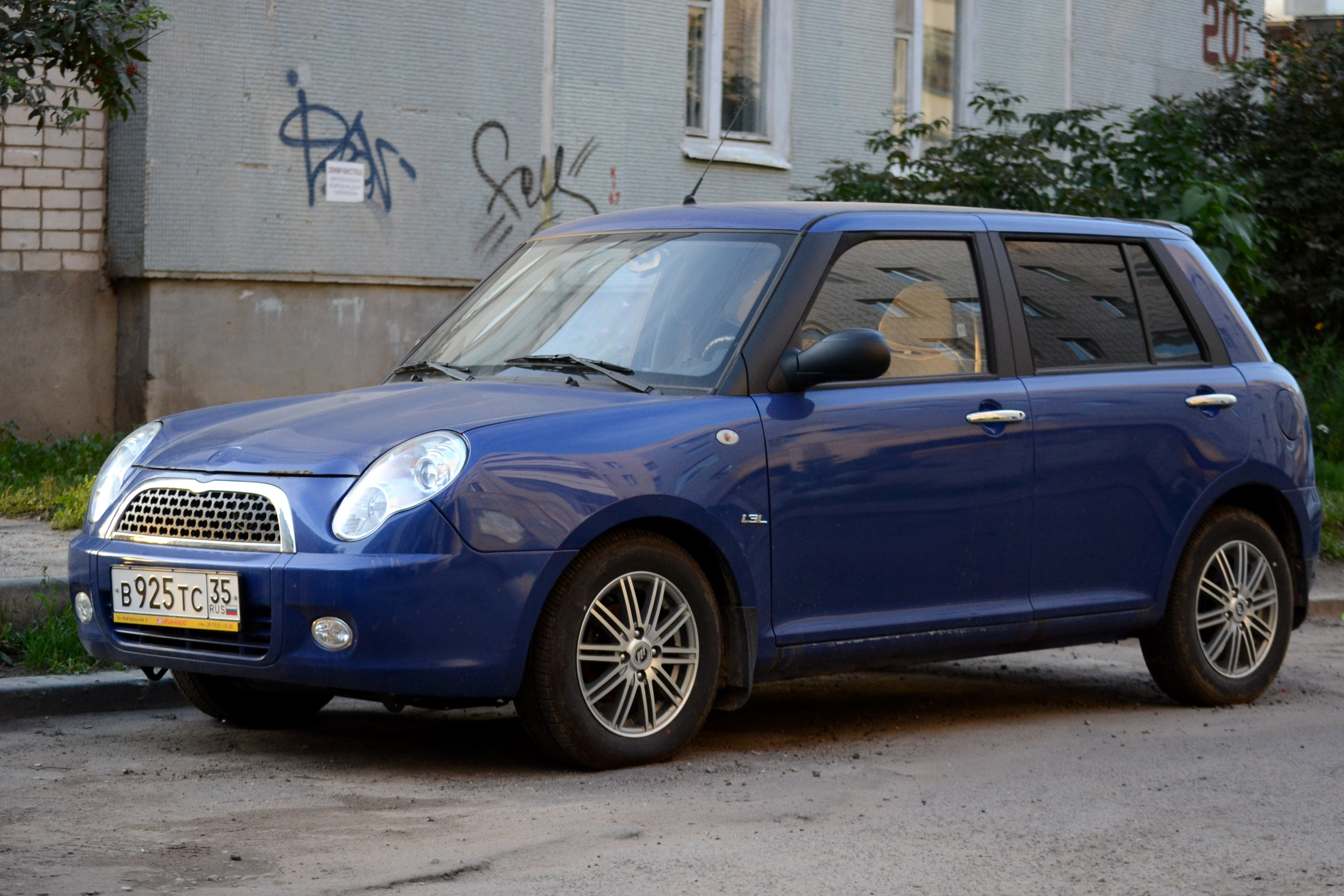
Lifan Smily (Russia)

== Design controversies ==
The styling of the Lifan 320 was considered a blatant knockoff of the 2001–2006 Mini Cooper when it was launched. Despite the different proportions and 5-door design, the interior, exterior duo color setup, headlamp design and tail lamp designs heavily resemble the designs from the Mini Cooper.

== Safety ==
In December 2014, a Chinese-made Lifan 320 model with no airbags and no ABS was crash tested by Latin NCAP 1.0 and received zero stars out of five. The comments from the press release cited: "The protection offered to the driver's head and chest was poor due to contact with the steering wheel. The passengers' knees could impact with dangerous structures in the dashboard like the Tran fascia tube. The bodyshell was rated as unstable."

Latin NCAP 1.5 test results Lifan 320 - NO Airbags (2014, similar to Euro NCAP 2002)
Test	Points	Stars
Adult occupant:	0.00/17.0	0 /5 stars
Child occupant:	4.72/49.00	0 /5 stars
