= Geely MK =

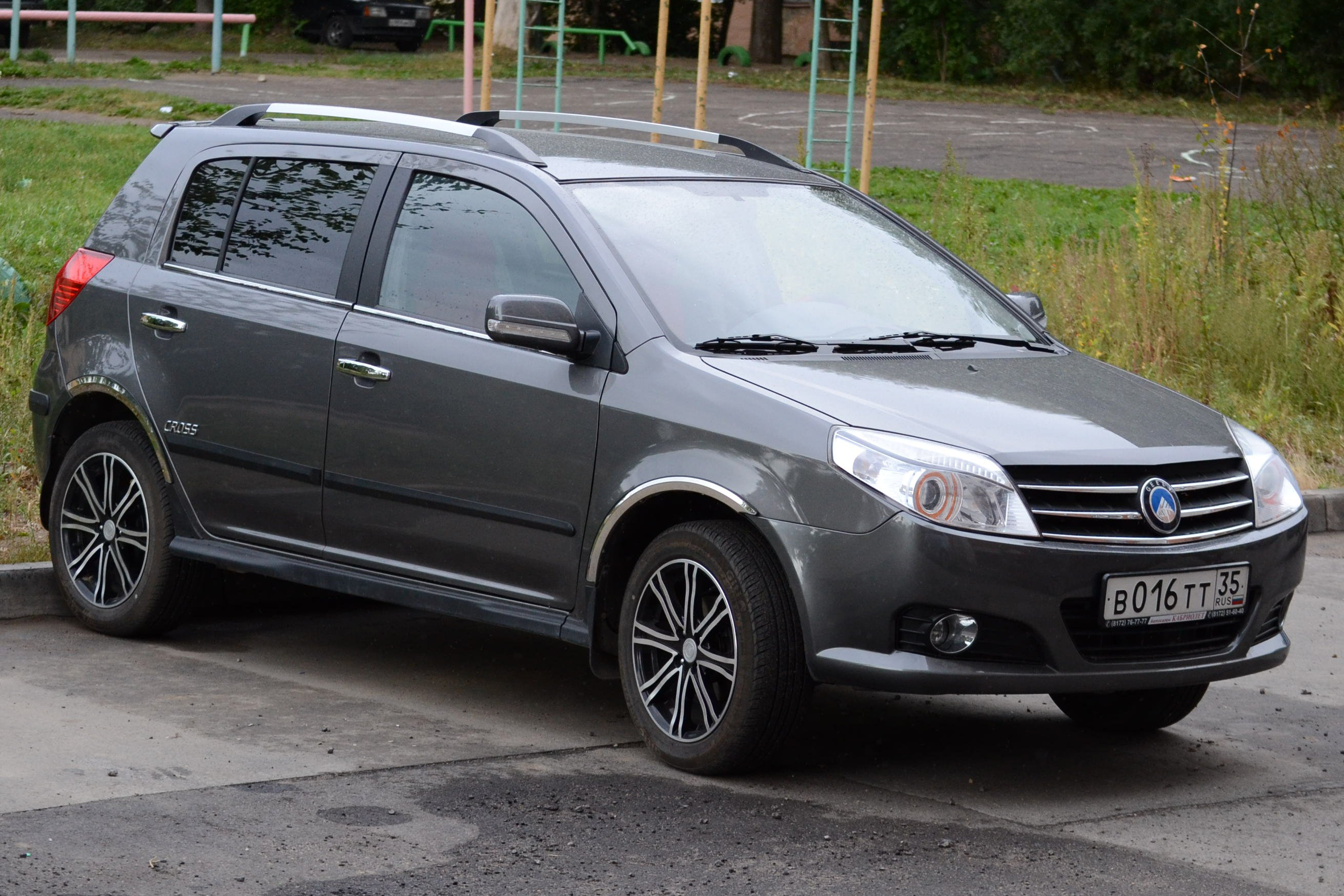
- 2010 Geely MK Cross

Overview
- Manufacturer: Geely Auto
- Also called: Geely MK; Geely LG; Geely Jinying/KingKong 金鹰 (hatchback); Geely Jingang/KingKong 金刚 (sedan); Englon SC6; Englon EC6; Geely EC6
- Production: 2006–2020
- Model years: 2006–2020
- Assembly: China: Ningbo, Zhejiang; Russia: Cherkessk, Karachay-Cherkessia (Derways); Ukraine: Kremenchuk (Kremenchuk Auto); Iran: Bam (BAC); Indonesia: Jakarta (Gaya Motor)

Body and chassis
- Class: Supermini
- Body style: 4-door saloon 5-door hatchback
- Layout: Front-engine, front-wheel-drive

Powertrain
- Engine: 1.5L 4G15 I4; 1.5L MR479QA I4; 1.5L MR479QN I4; 1.6L MR481QA I4 (78kw); 1.8L MR481QA I4 (80kw)
- Transmission: 5-speed manual 4-speed automatic

Dimensions
- Wheelbase: 2,502 mm (98.5 in)
- Length: 4,342 mm (170.9 in) (sedan); 4,000 mm (157.5 in) (hatchback)
- Width: 1,692 mm (66.6 in)
- Height: 1,435 mm (56.5 in)

Chronology
- Predecessor: Geely CK

The Geely MK is a subcompact sedan and hatchback produced by Chinese auto maker Geely Auto.

== Overview ==
The Geely MK subcompact sedan is a reverse engineered first generation Toyota Vios with a similar dimensions, side profile, and dashboard design. The MK also resembles a Opel Astra H from the front and rear.

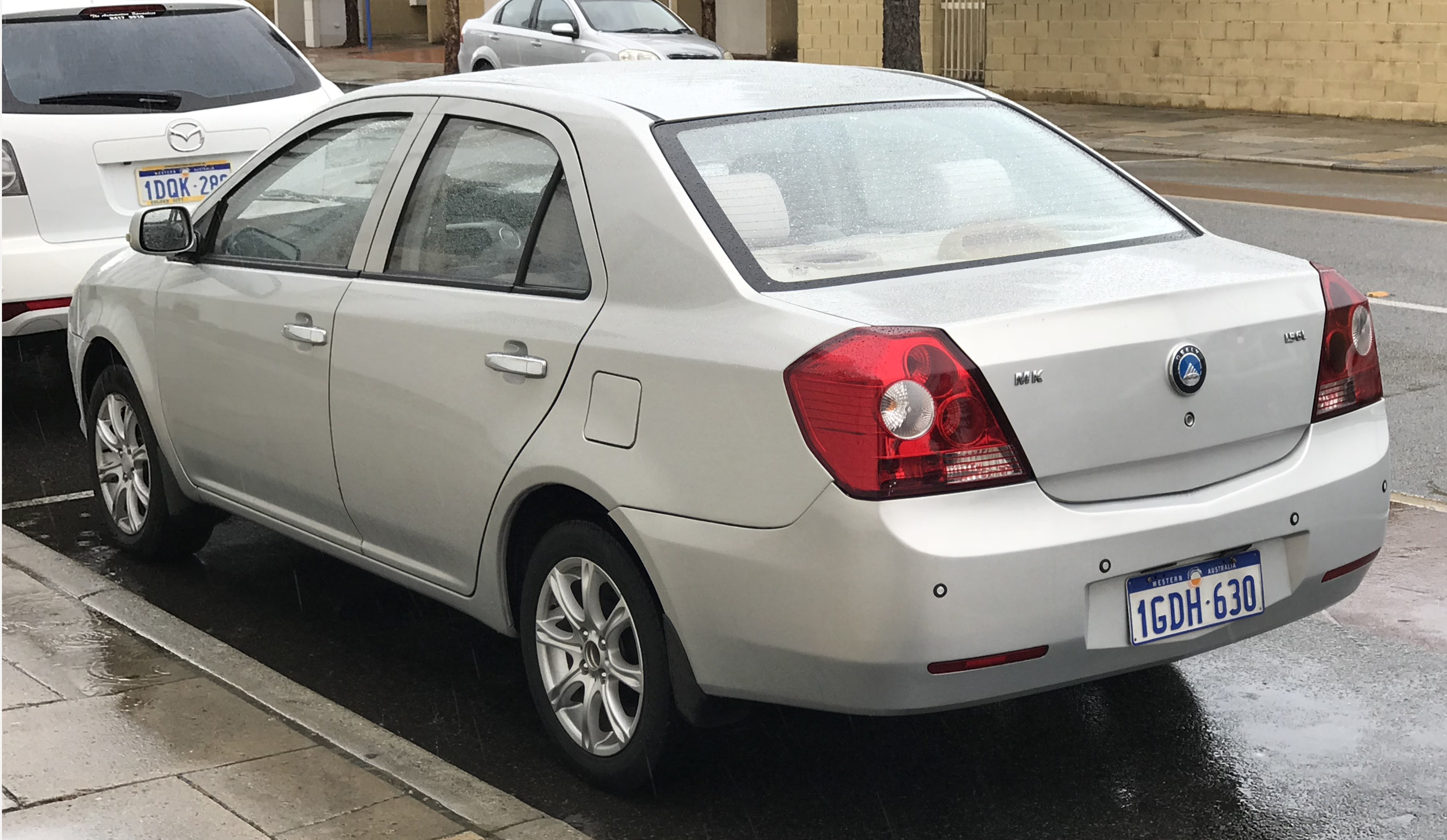
Geely Jingang (MK) sedan

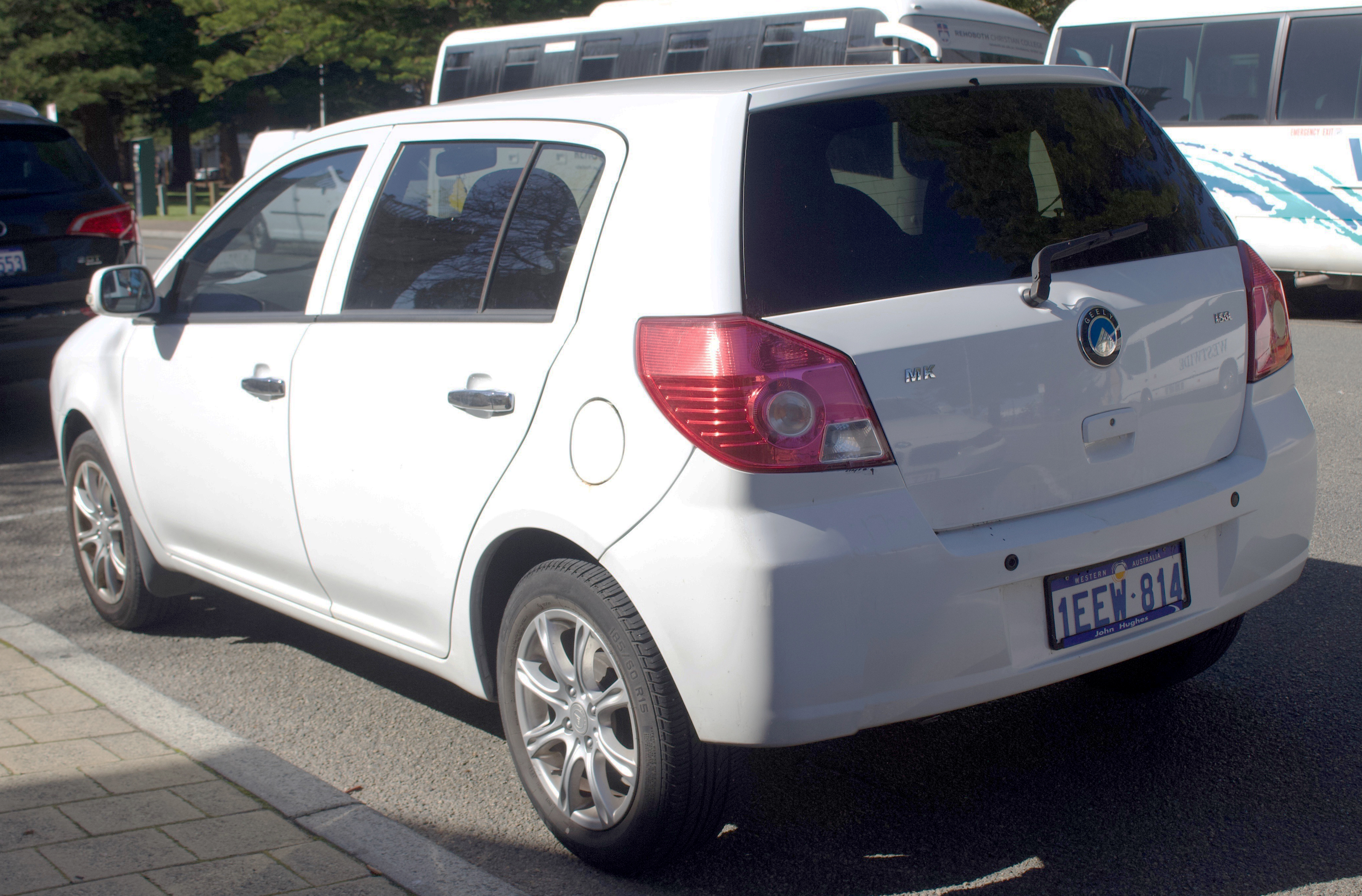
Geely Jingang (MK) hatchback

=== Geely Englon SC6-RV ===
The Geely Englon SC6-RV debuted as a concept at the 2010 Beijing Auto Show and started production in 2012. The Englon SC6-RV is based on the post-facelift Geely Golden Eagle Cross (Jinying cross), which are both crossover hatchback versions of the Geely MK which was also known as the Geely Jinying.

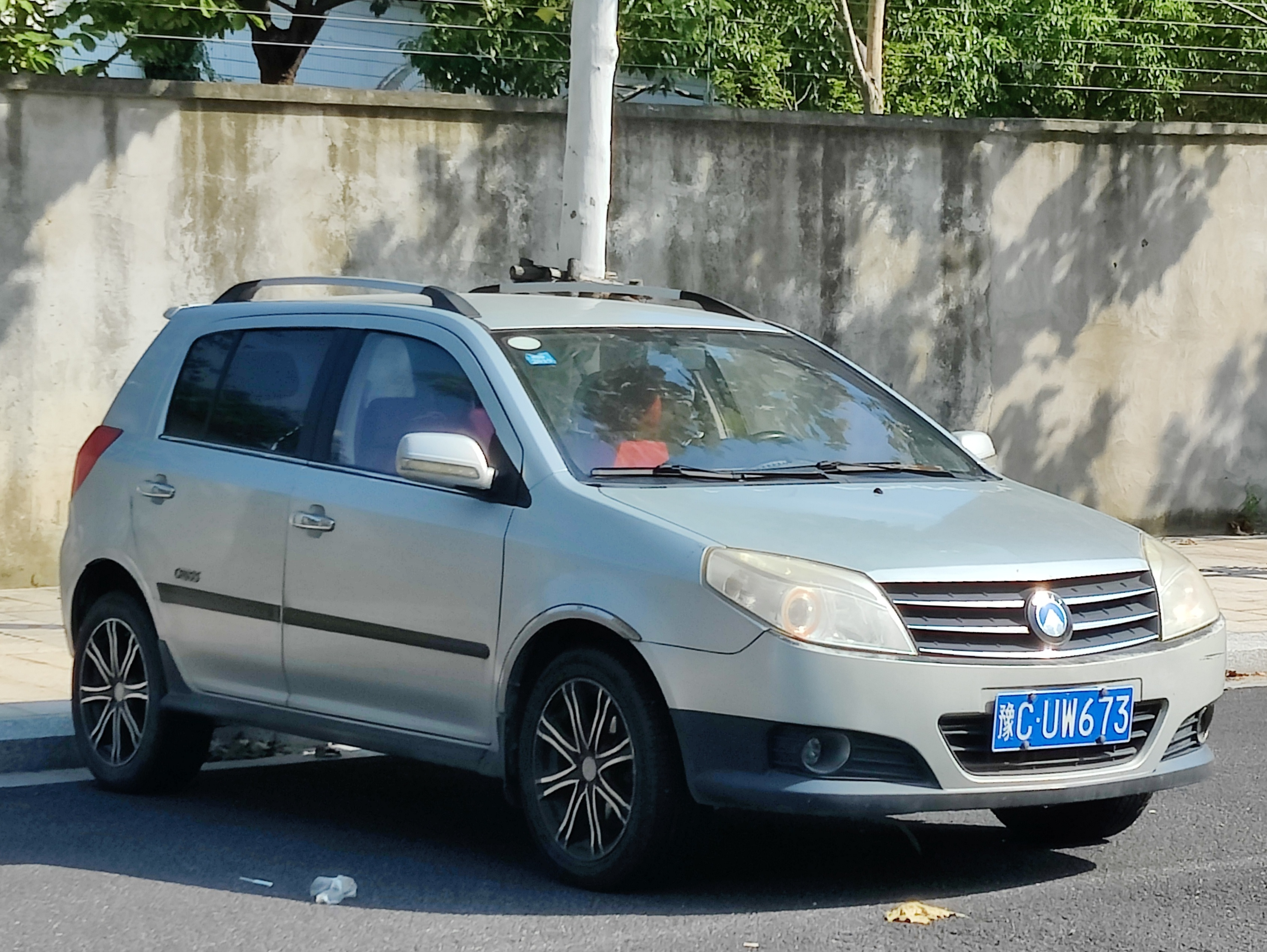
Geely Jinying Cross

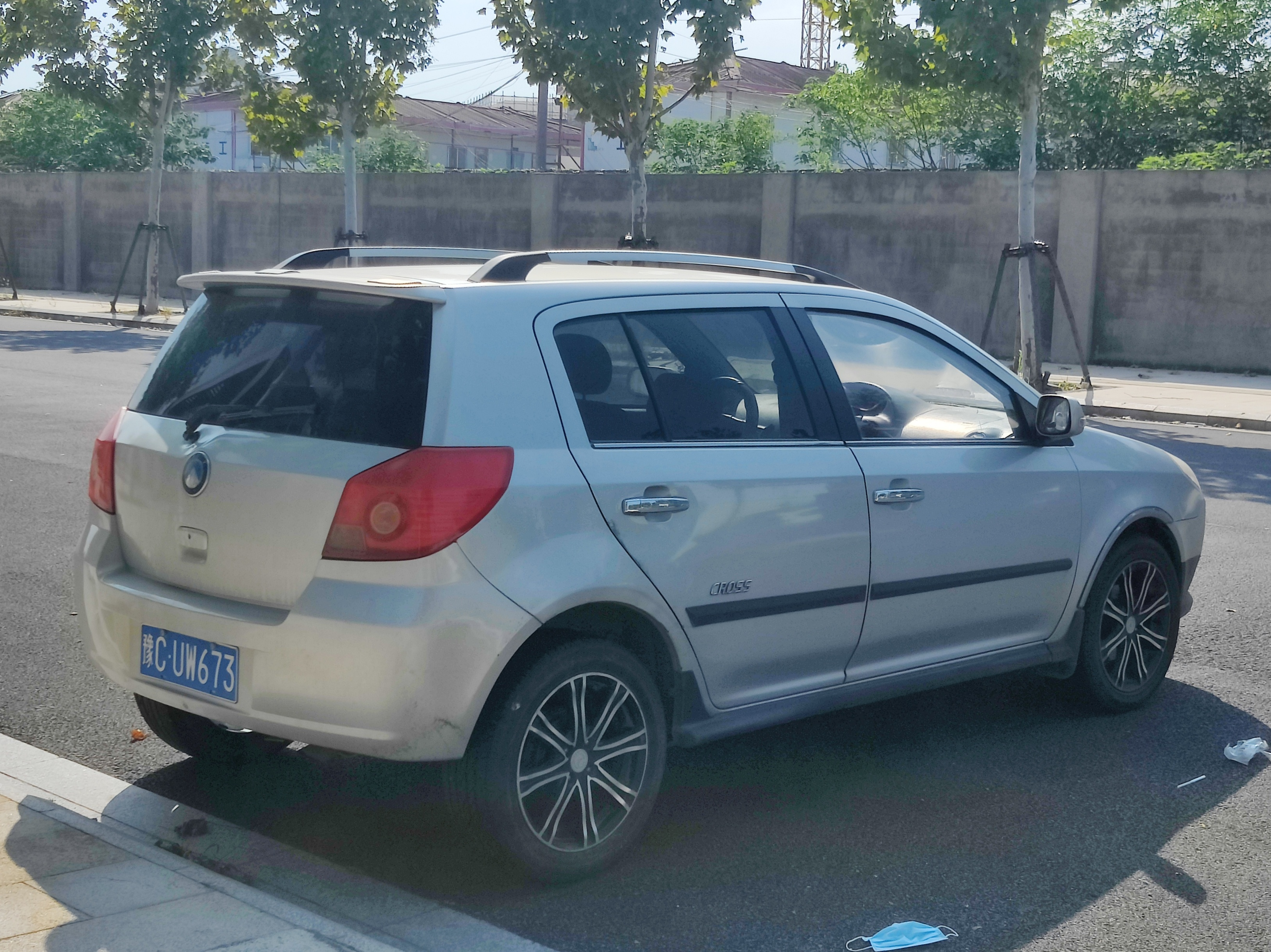
Geely Jinying Cross (rear)

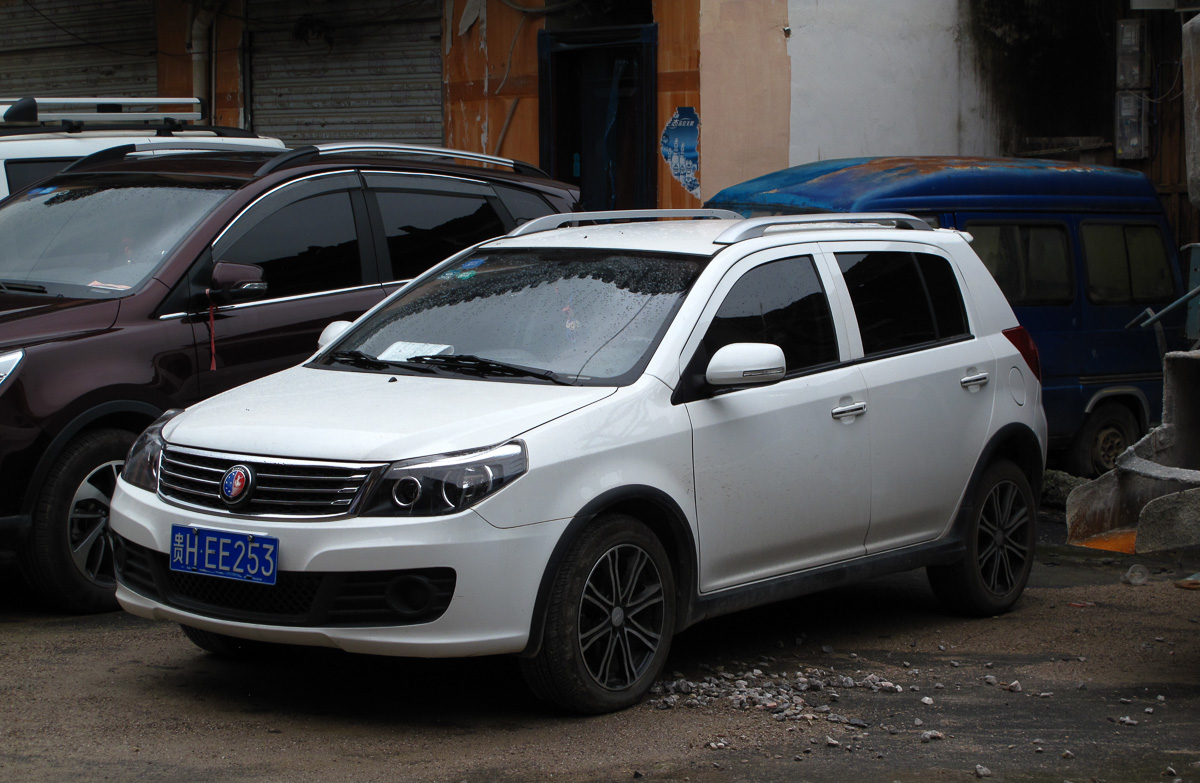
Geely Jinying Cross facelift

=== Geely Englon SC6 ===
Based on the Geely MK sedan, the Geely Englon SC6 originally revealed as a concept in 2011. The production version debuted at the Beijing Auto Show in April 2012. Three engines were available including a 1.3L, a 1.5L and a 1.8L mated to a six-speed tiptronic gearbox. Price ranges from 53.800 yuan to 60.800 yuan.

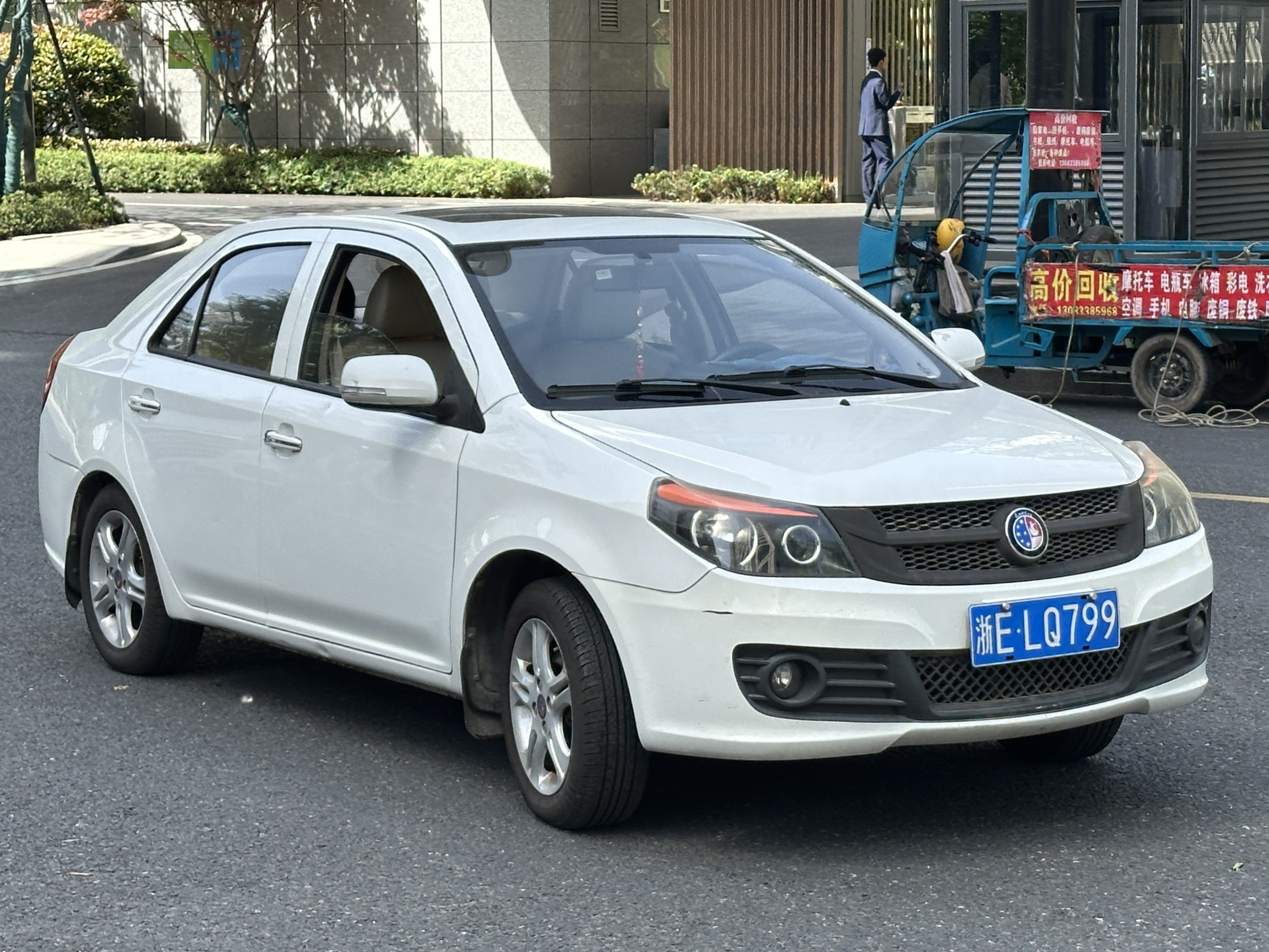
Geely Englon SC6 sedan

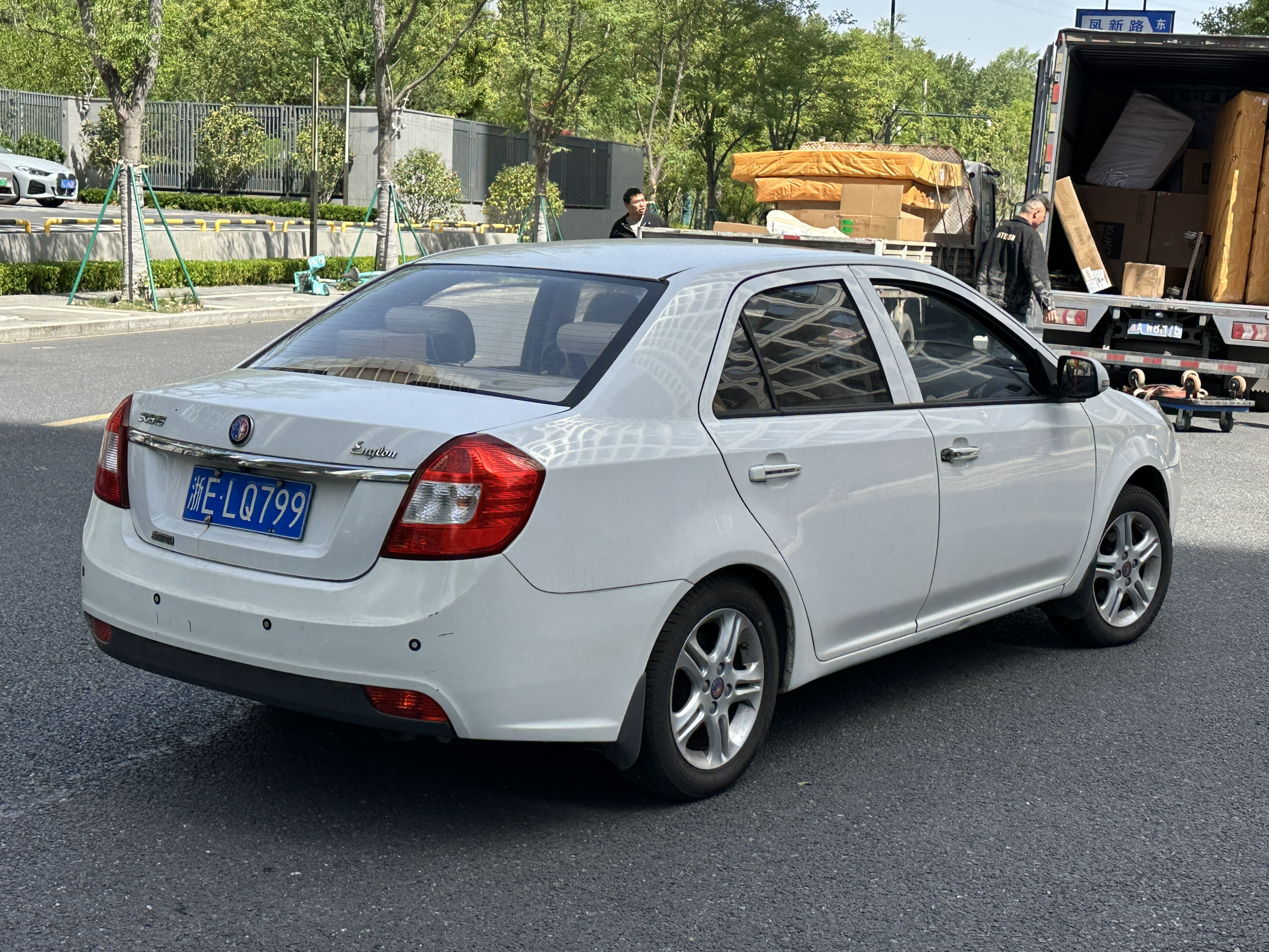
Rear view

=== Englon EC6 2016 facelift ===
The last facelift was conducted in late 2015 for the 2016 model year, changing the front and rear views and clarifying the updated model name and branding simply as the Geely Jingang under the Geely brand.

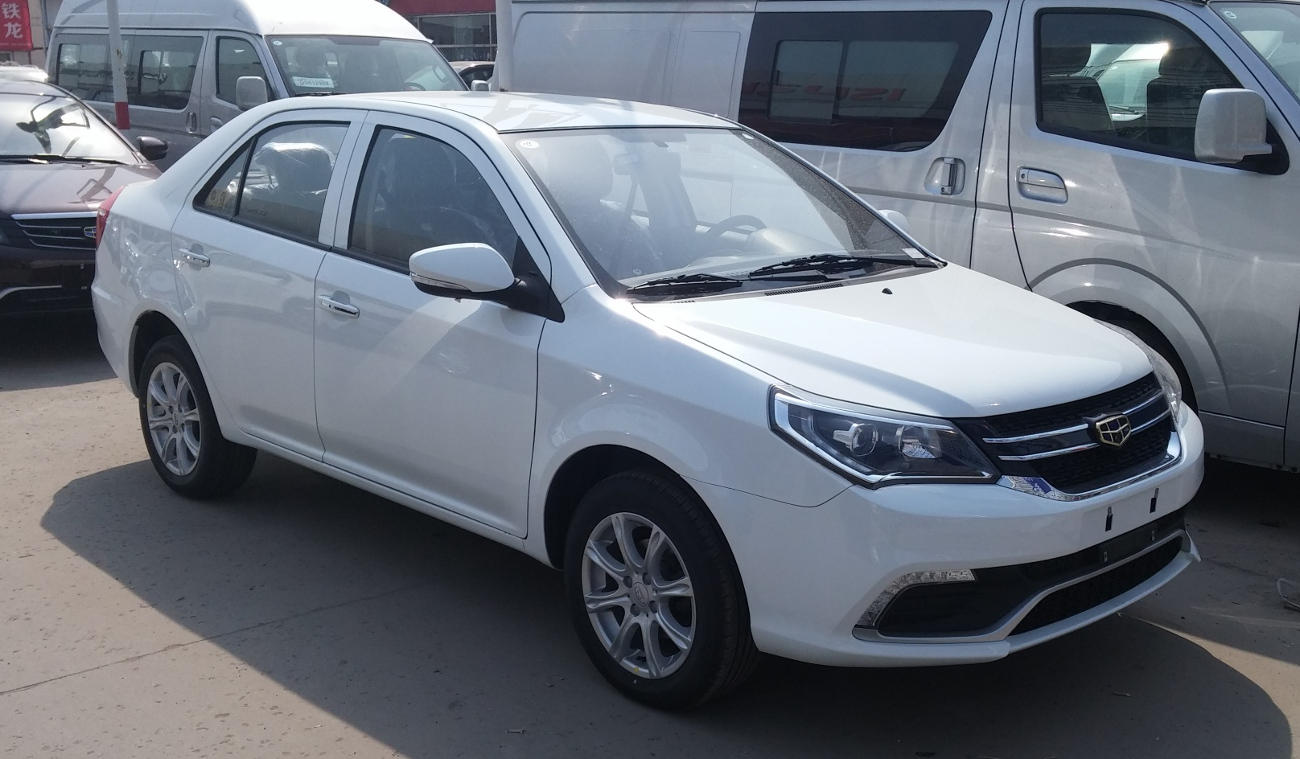
Geely Jingang (MK) sedan 2016 facelift

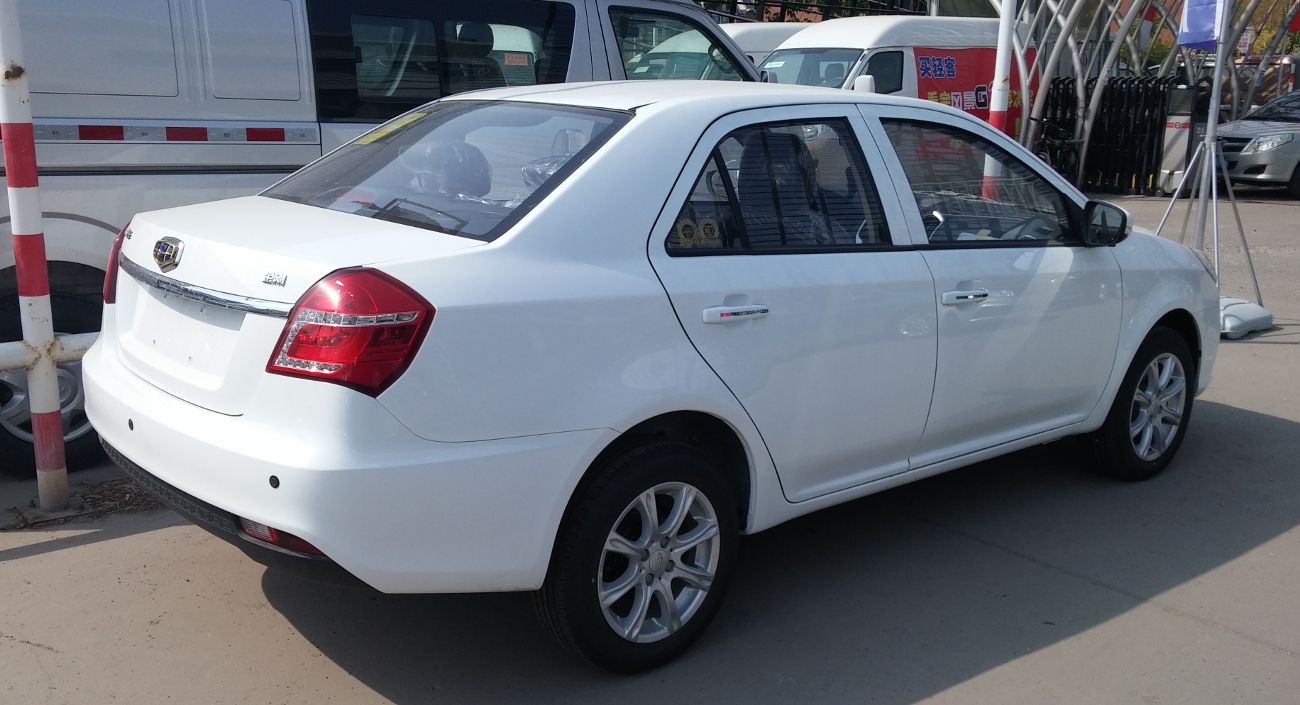
Geely Jingang (MK) sedan 2016 facelift

== Safety ==
ANCAP test results Geely MK (2011)
Test	Score
Overall	3 /5 stars
Frontal offset	8.46/16
Side impact	12.10/16
Pole	Not Assessed
Seat belt reminders	0/3
Whiplash protection	Not Assessed
Pedestrian protection	Not Assessed
Electronic stability control	Not Available
