= Chana Star =

Chinese microvan

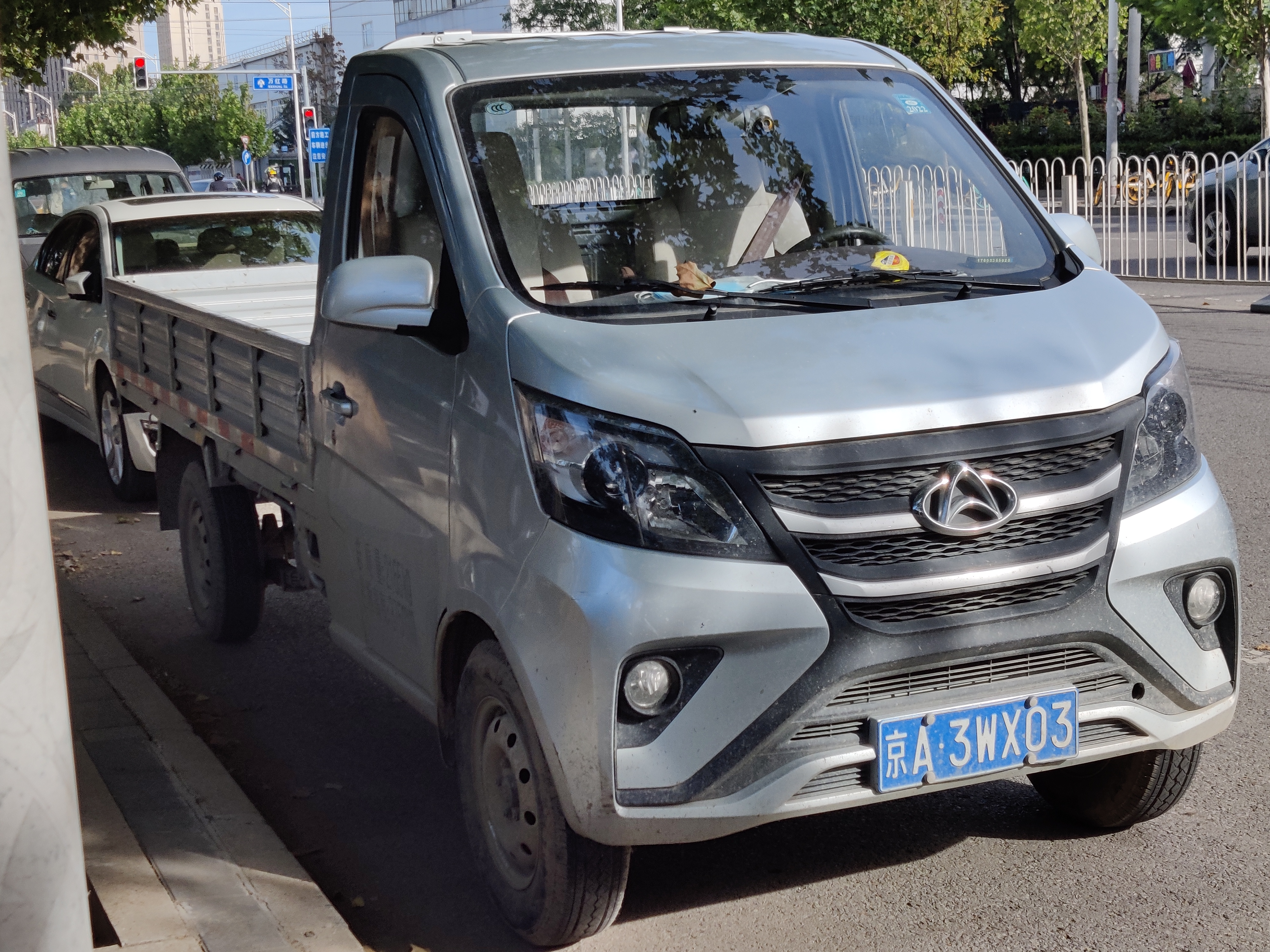

Overview
- Manufacturer: Changan Automobile
- Production: 1999–present

Body and chassis
- Class: Microvan
- Body style: Van; Pickup truck
- Layout: FR layout, F4 layout

The Chana Star or Changan Star, more recently the Kaicene Star, (Chinese: 长安之星) is a series of trucks and microvans built and sold by Changan Automobile under the Chana brand since 1999. The Changan Star series was later repositioned under the Kaicene sub-brand of Changan Automobile.

The Star started off as rebadged tenth generation Suzuki Carry trucks and Suzuki Every vans, with multiple bodystyles spawned by Changan Automobile available. The model was later extended into a product series with several models.

== First generation (1999–2014) ==
The Chana Star was launched in 1999 based on the Suzuki Every Plus and Ford Pronto vans. A few models were available, including a single cab pickup, double cab pickup, standard van, and an extended version van featuring hinged doors instead of sliding doors.

The successor, Chan Star 2, was launched in 2007. However, the Chana Star 2 has not replaced the Chana Star, which, after a subtle facelift restyling, remains on the market positioned just below the Chana Star 2 as of early 2014 with a starting price lowered to 25,000 Yuan.

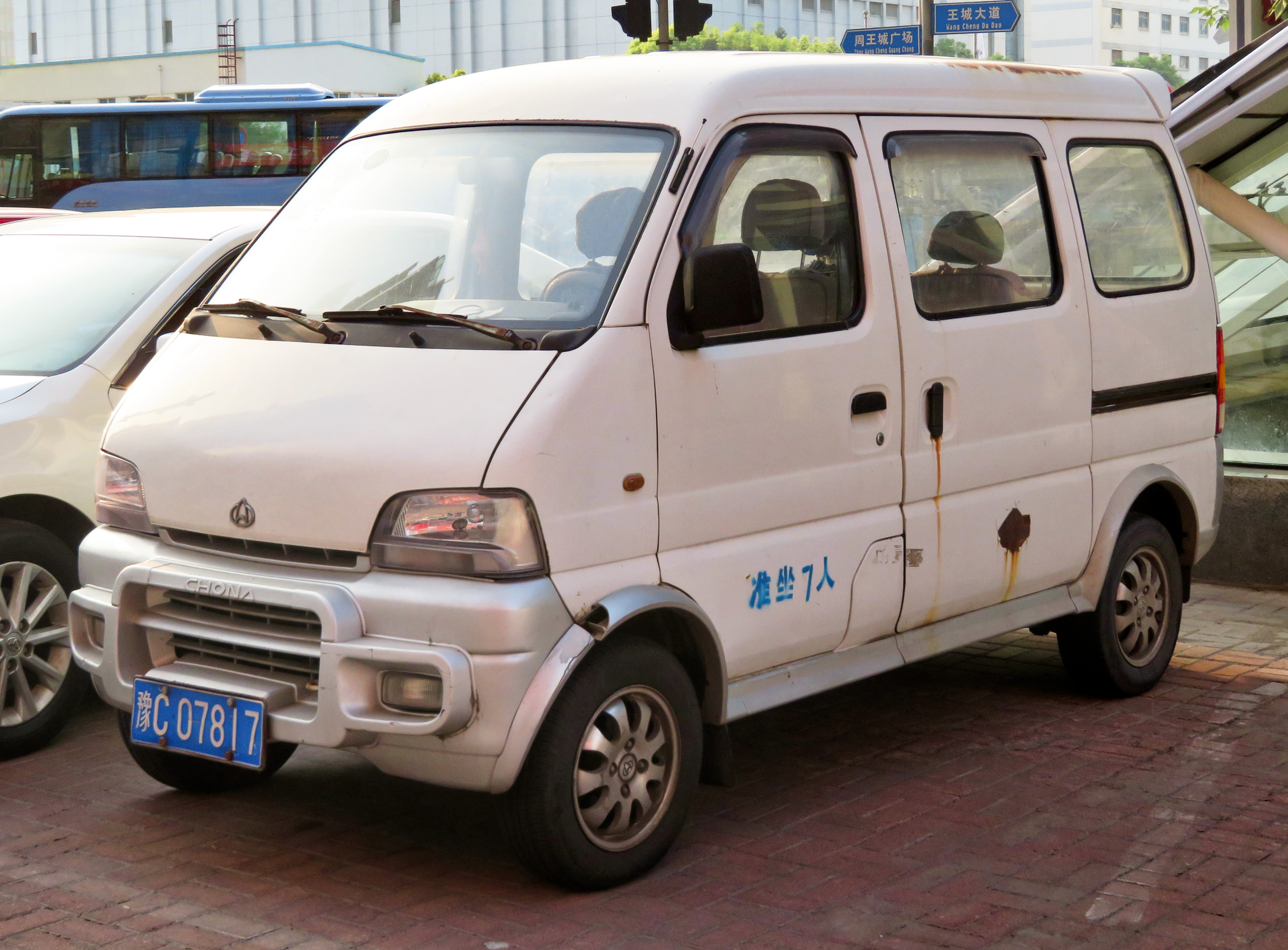
Original Chang'an Star SC6371 (thicker bumper)

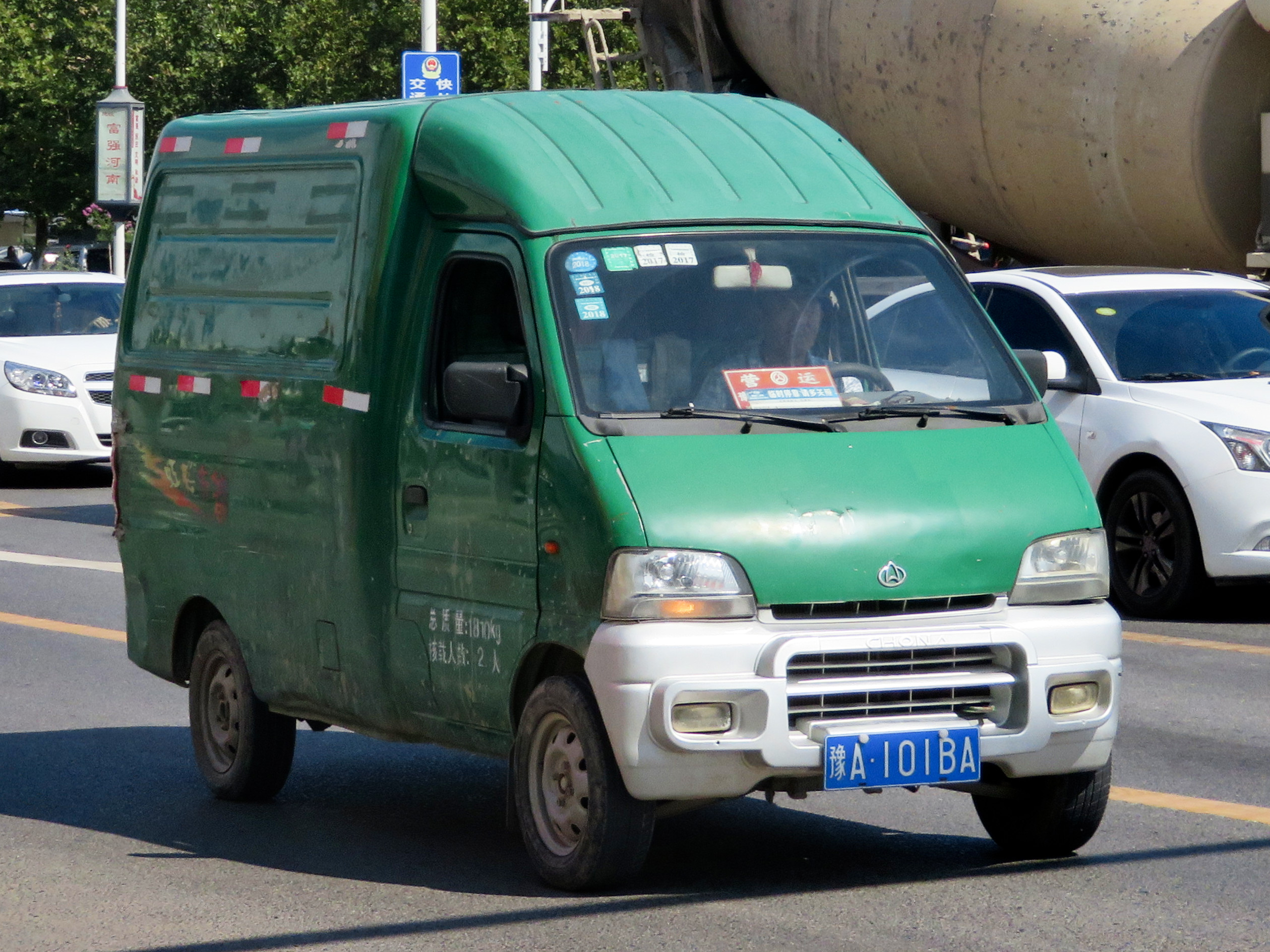
Chang'an Star "City Rainbow"

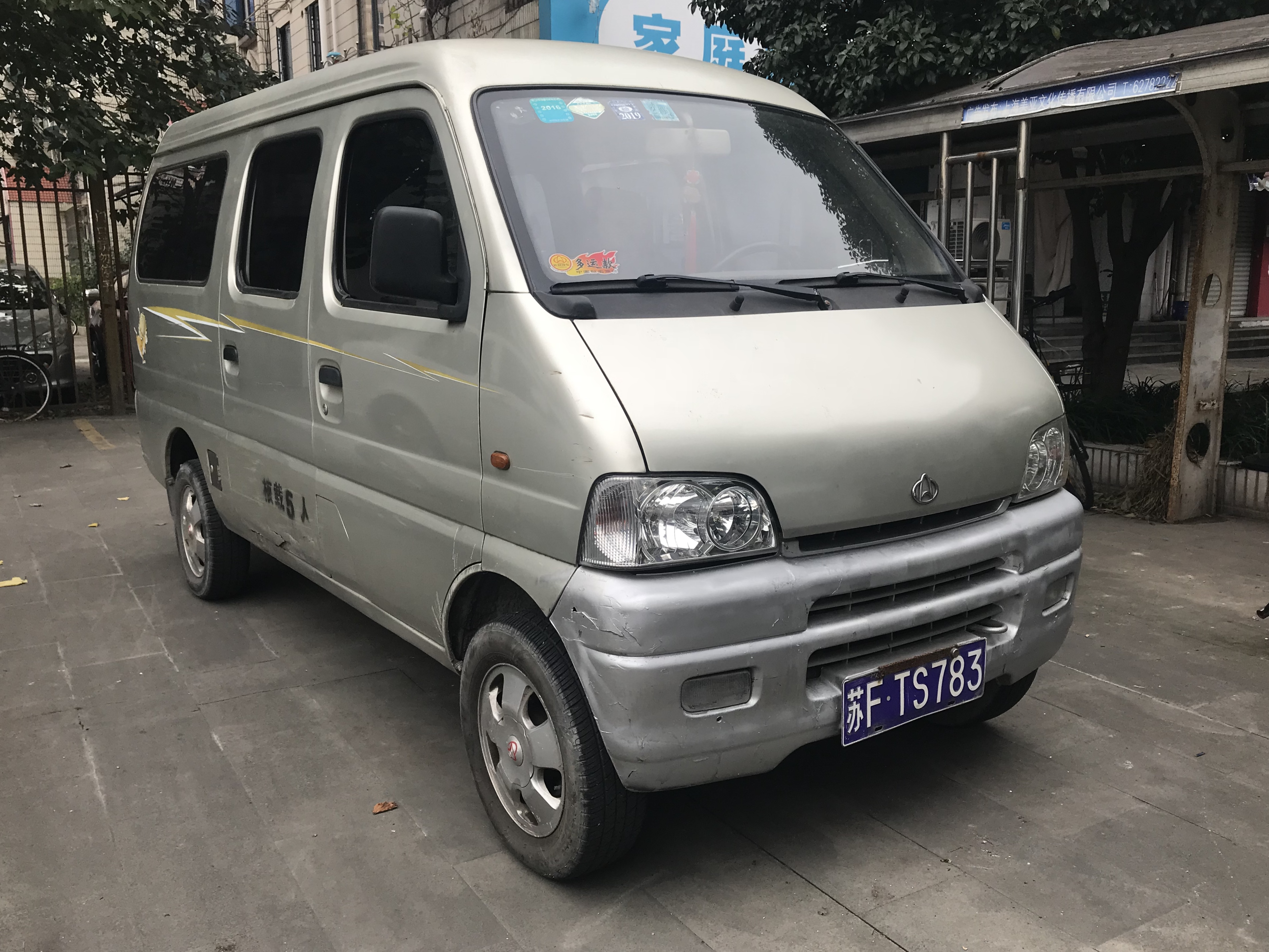
Extended version

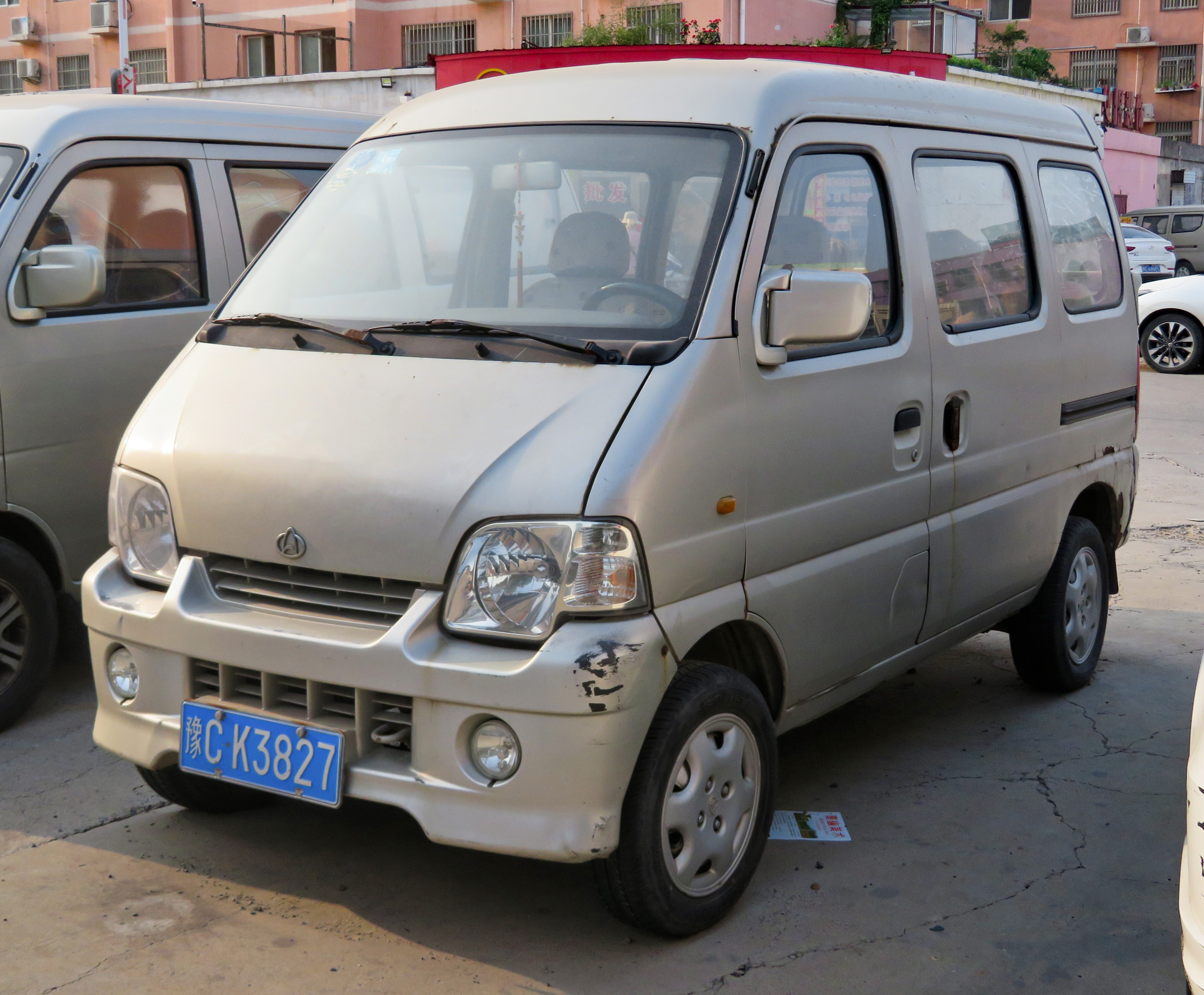
Chang'an Xingyun (Chinese: 星韵)

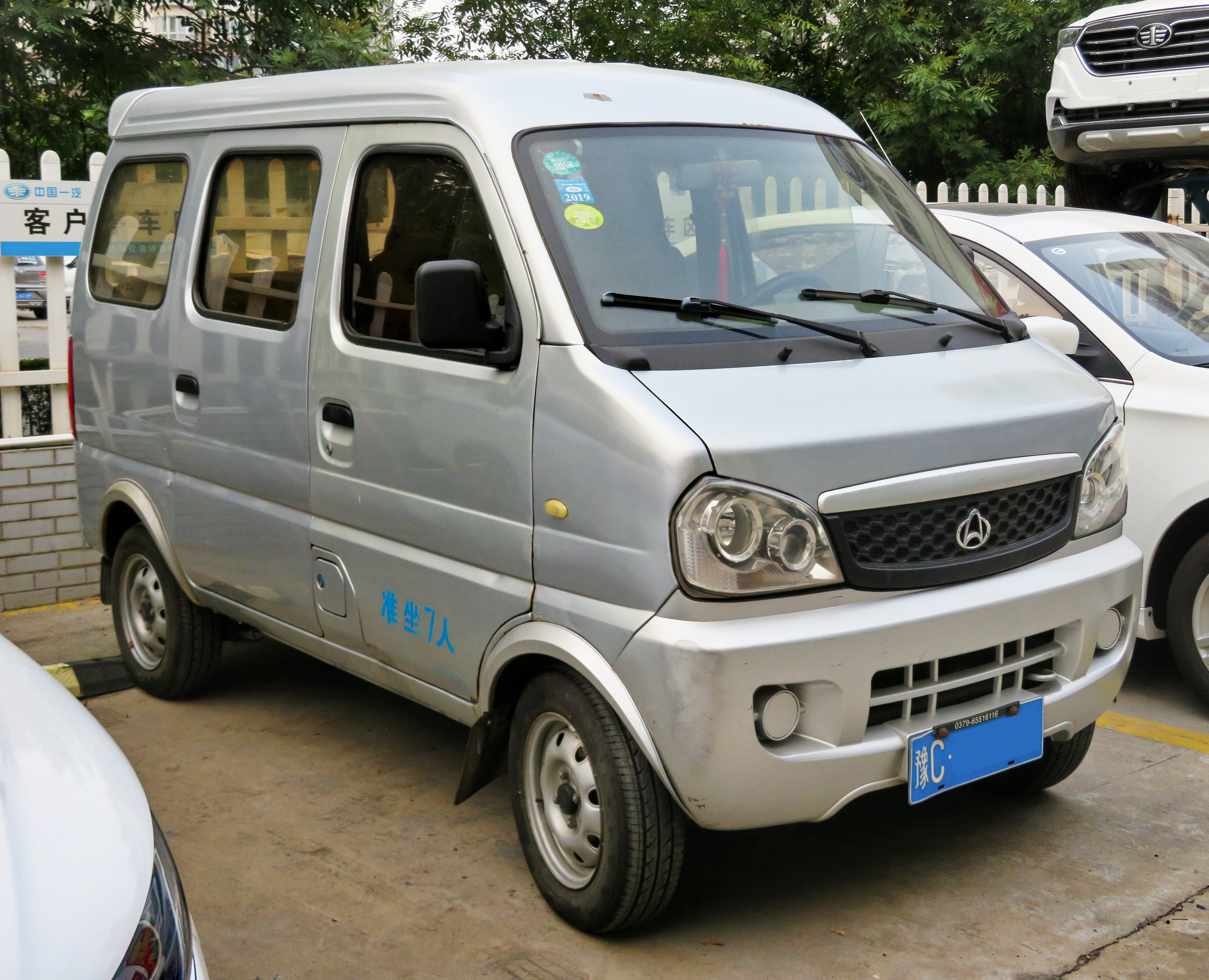
Chang'an Xingguang (Chinese: 星光)

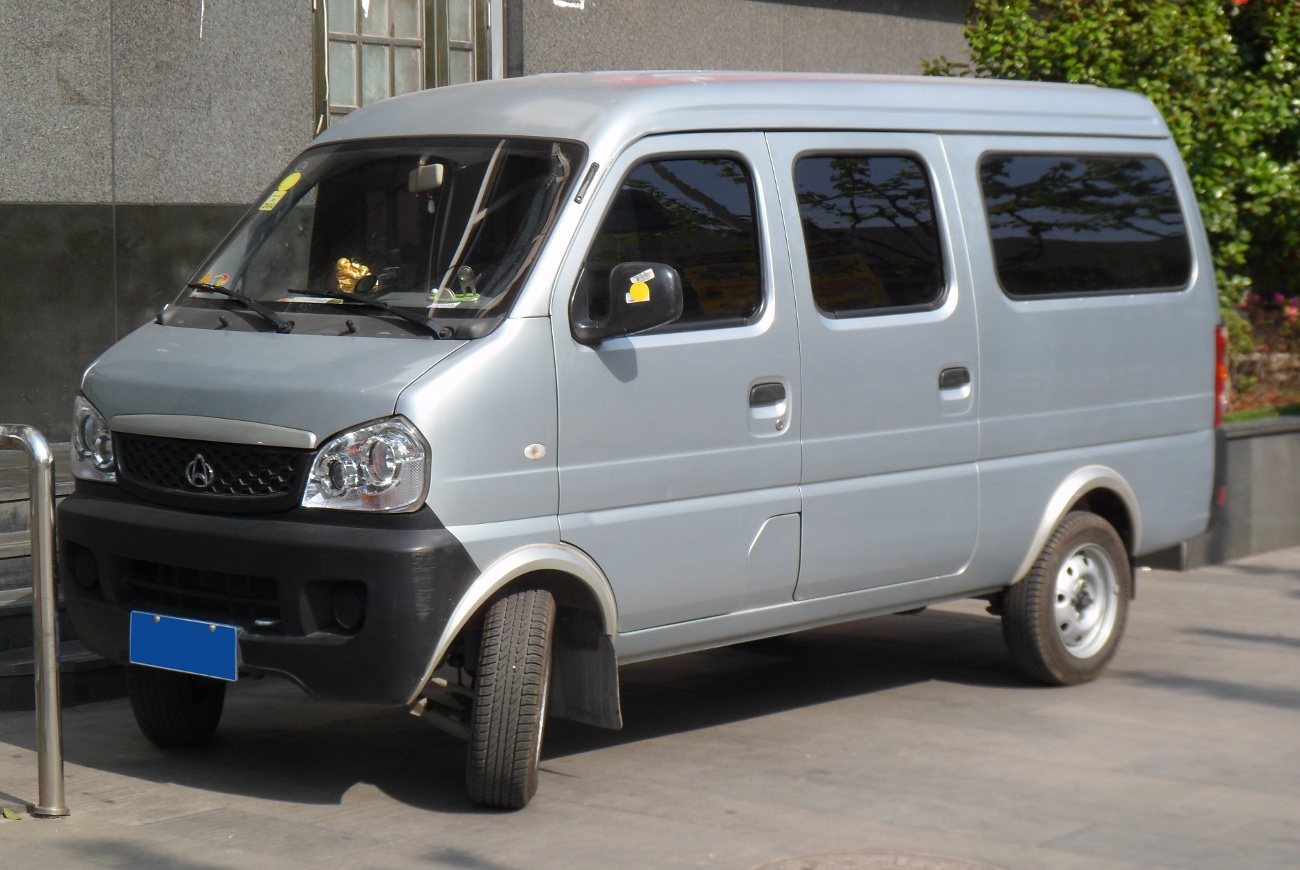
Chang'an Xingguang (extended variant)

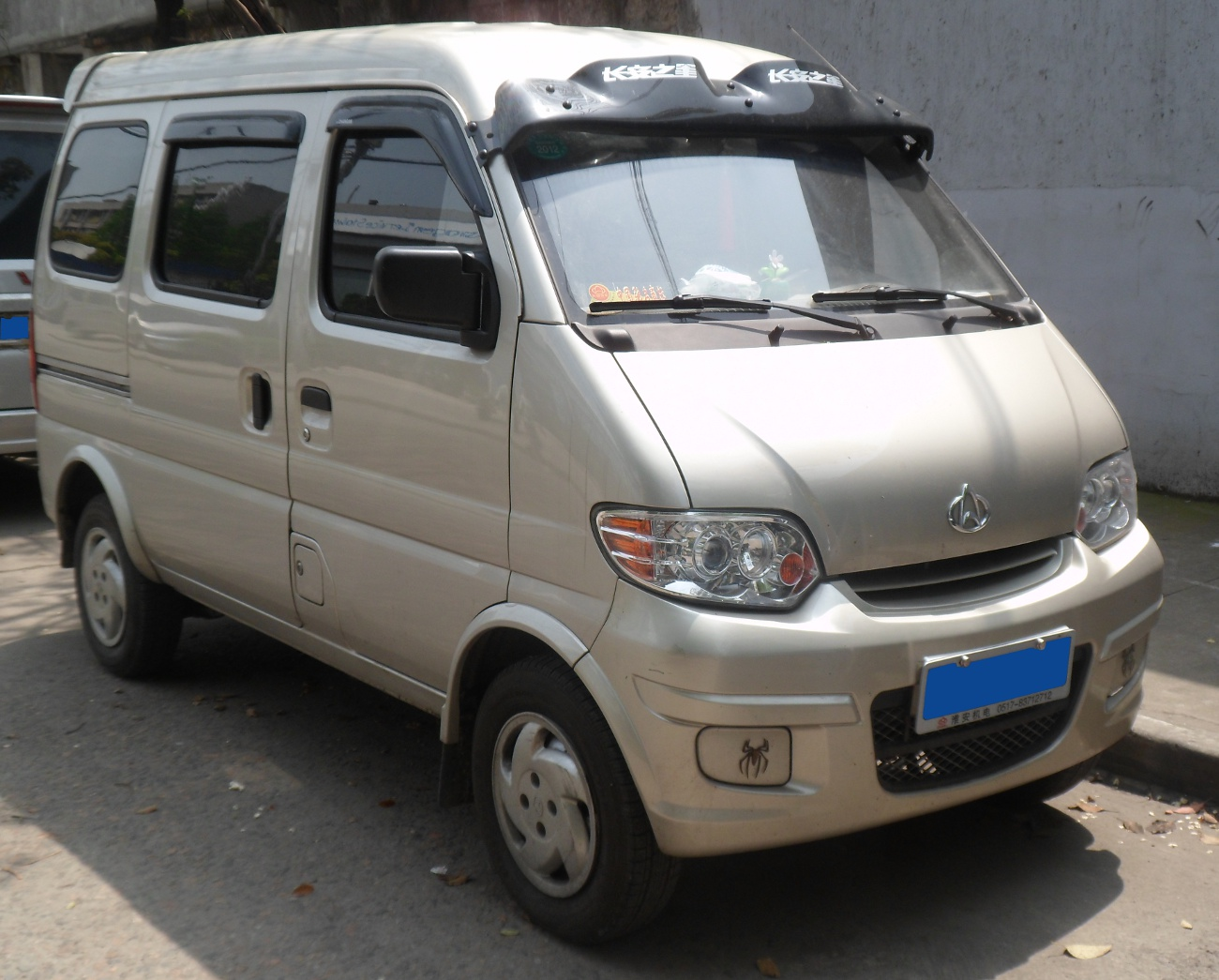
Chang'an Star facelift (Sold alongside the Chana 2)

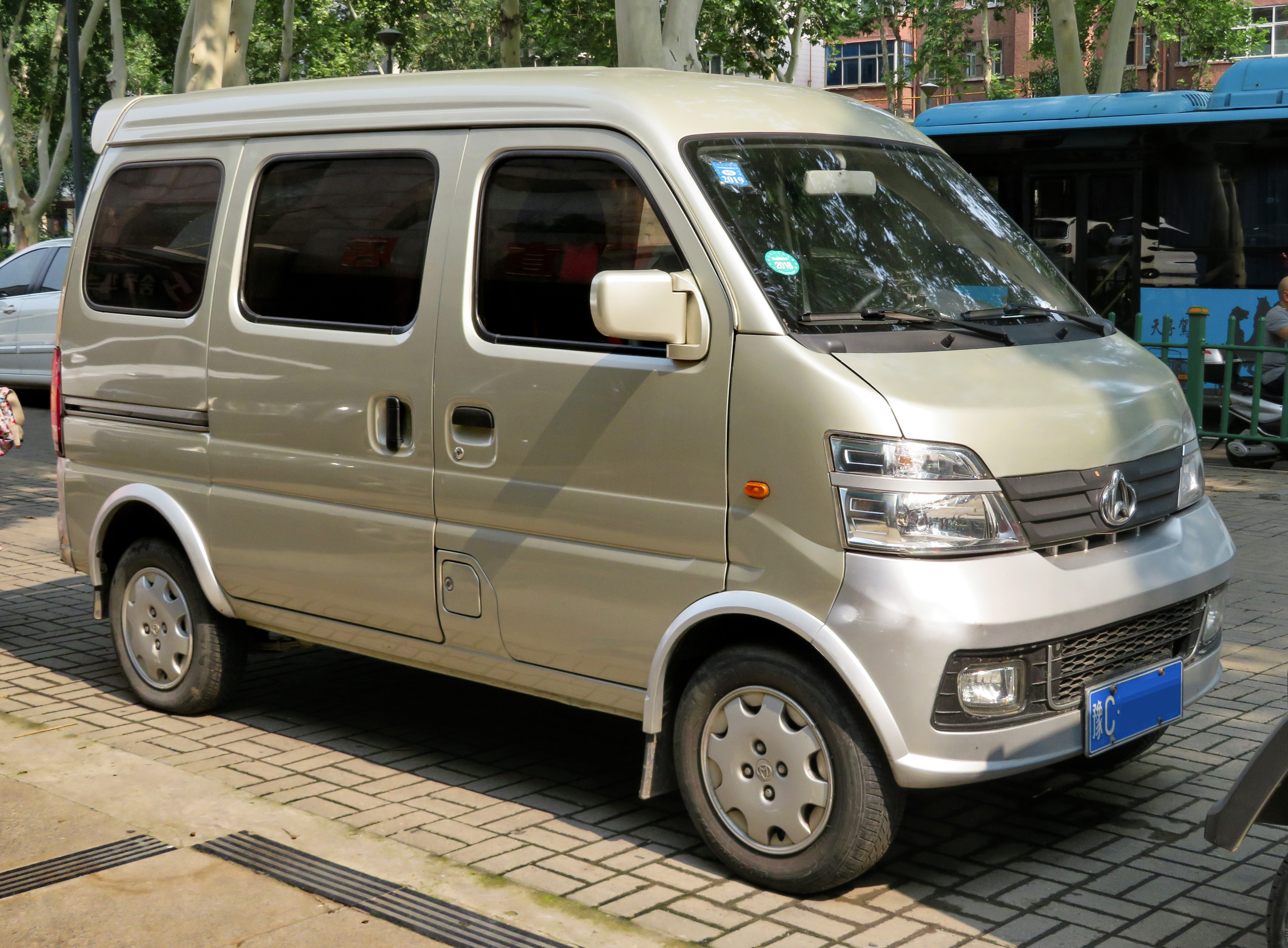
Chana Star (Second facelift, China)

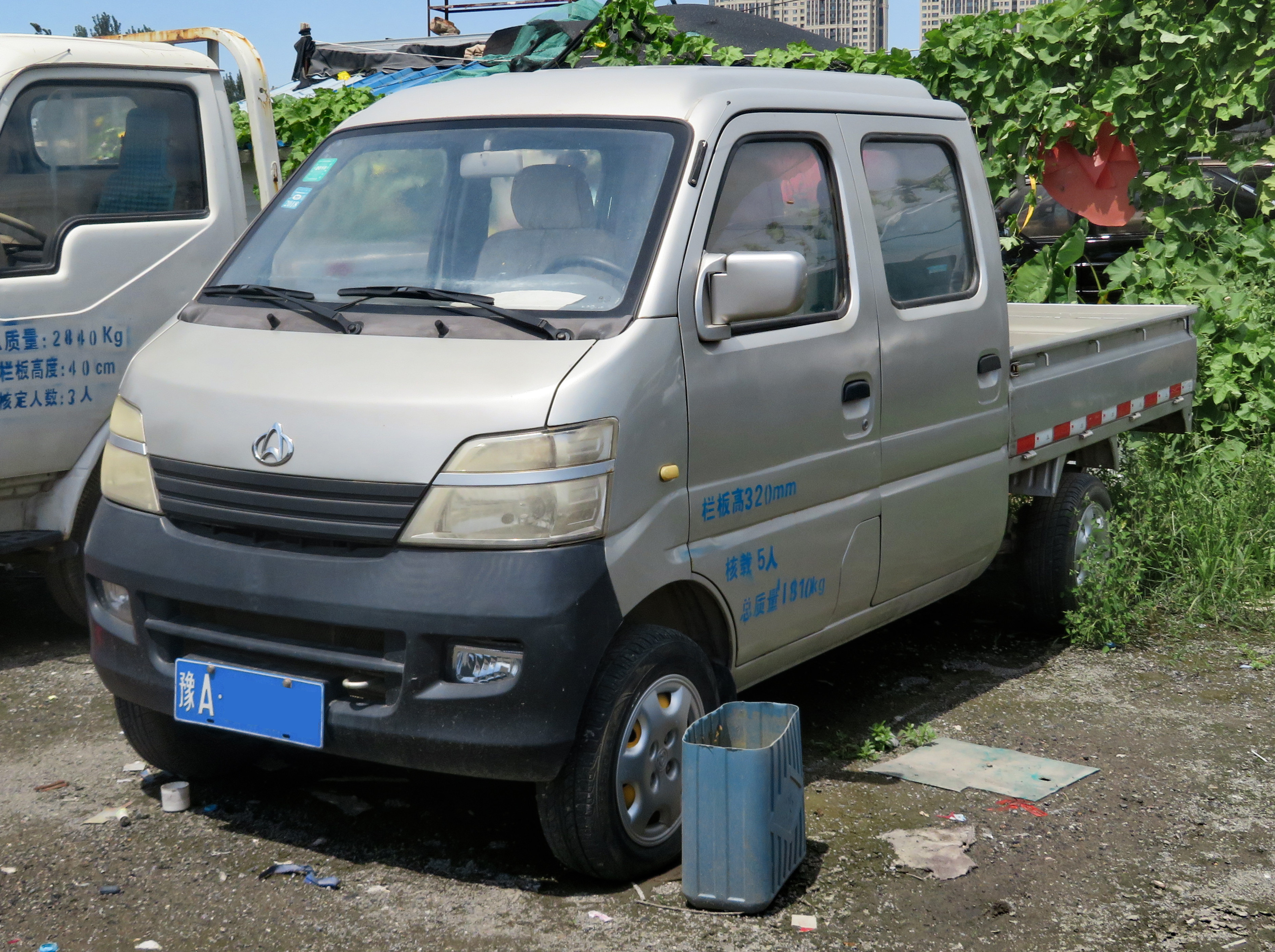
Chana Star facelift pickup (double cab, sold alongside the Chana 2)

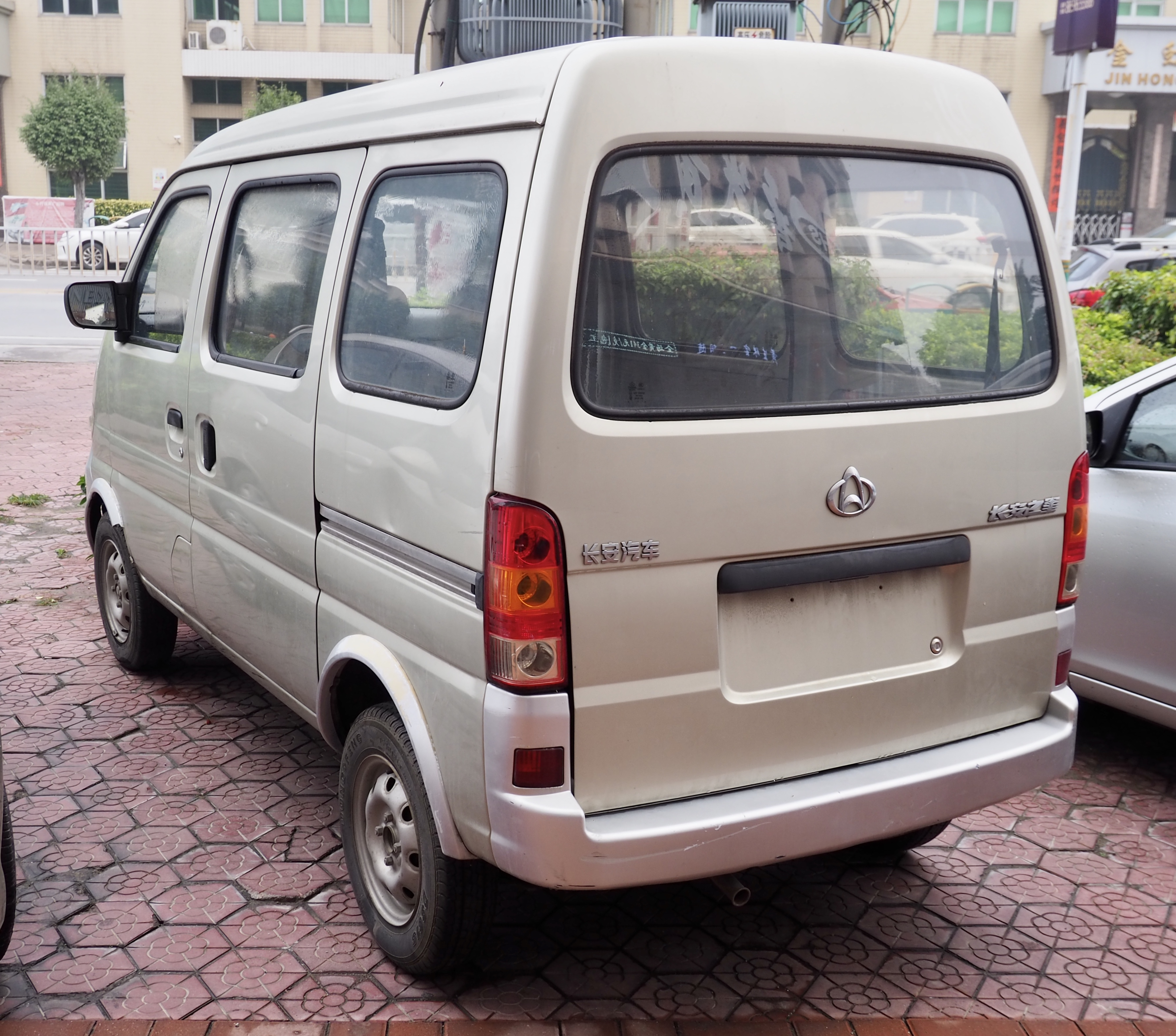
rear view (standard)

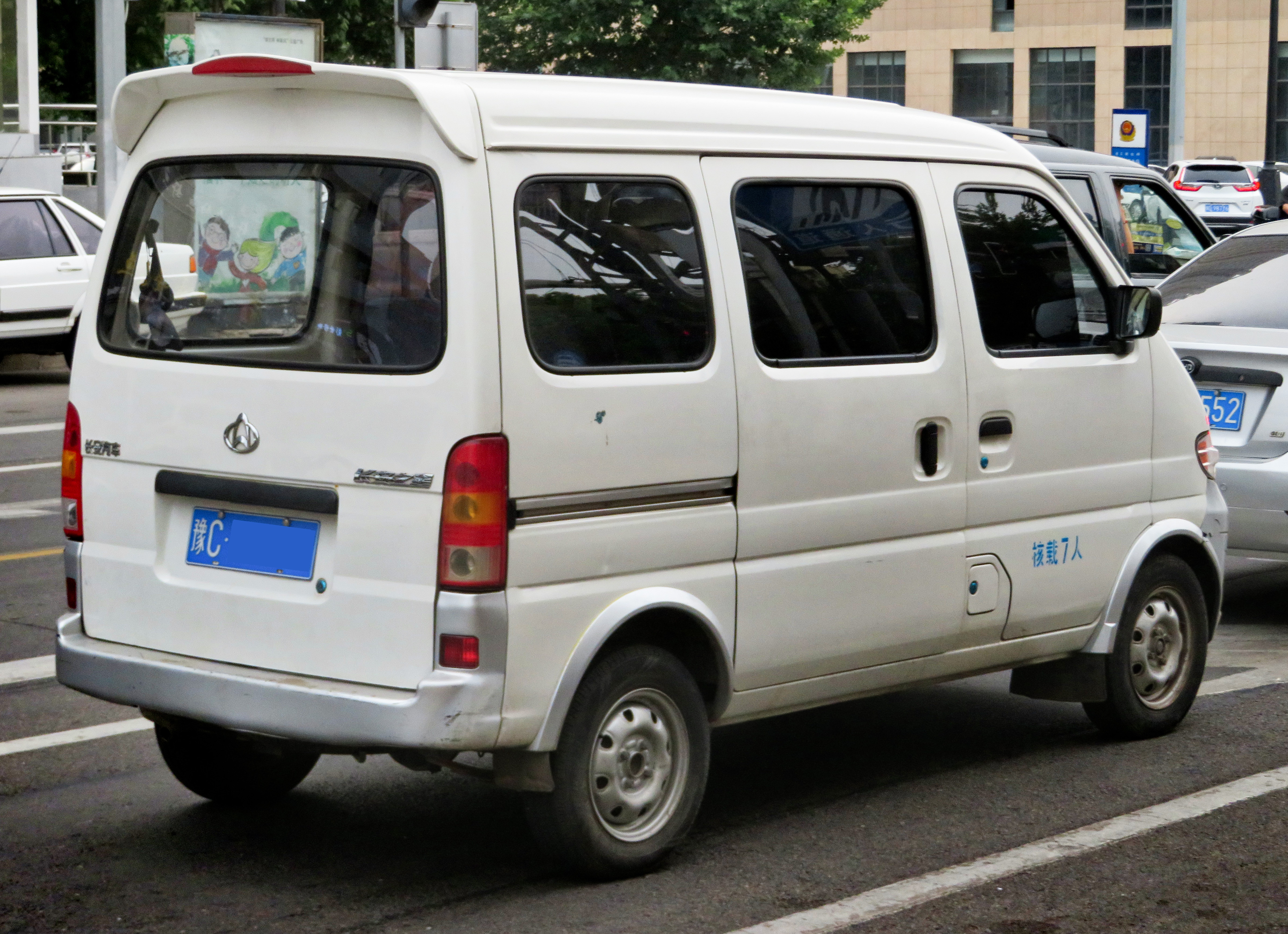
rear view (roof add-on)

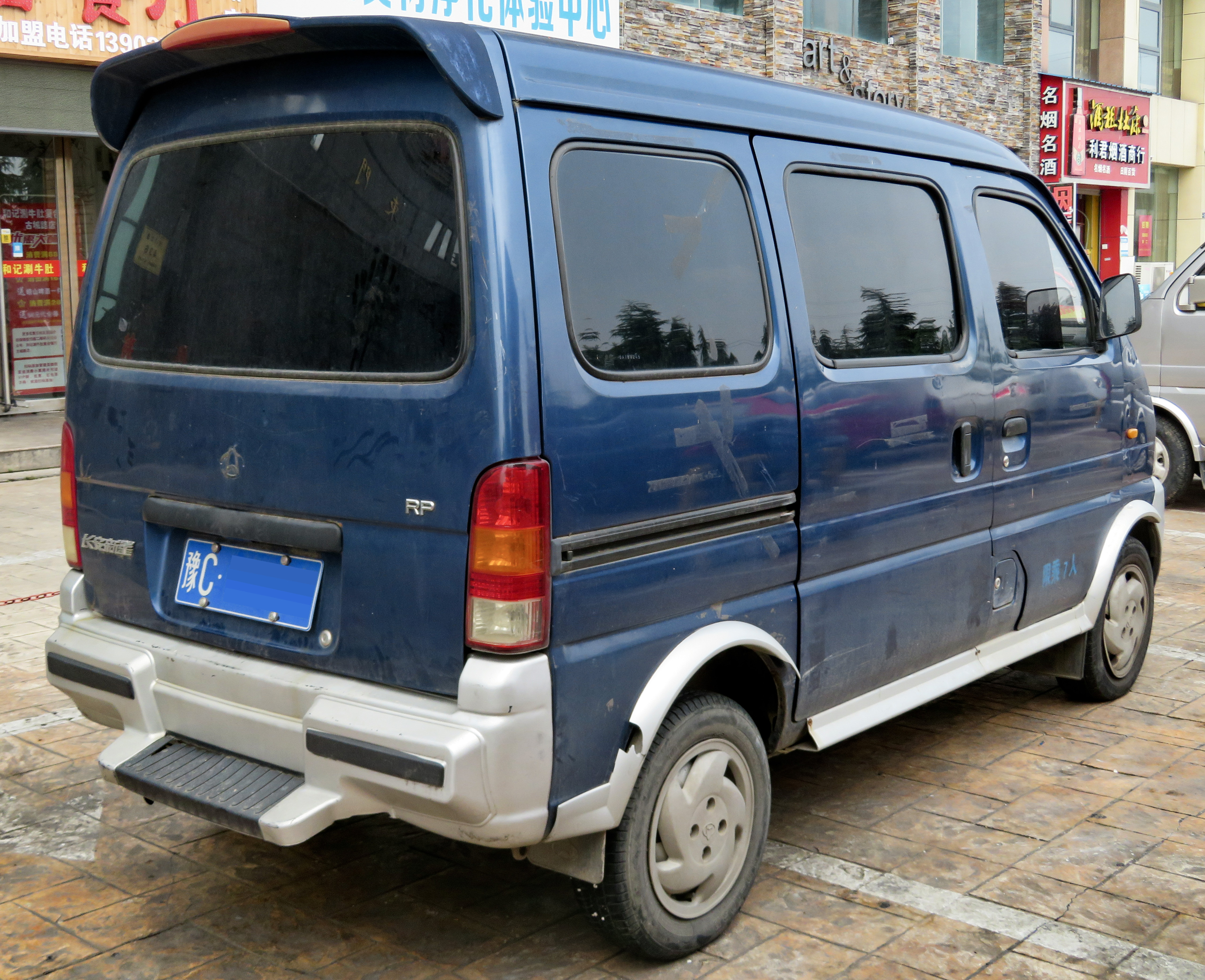
rear view (roof add-on & thicker bumper)

=== Kaicene Shenqi T20 ===
A series of pickup variant was sold under the Kaicene brand as the Kaicene Shenqi T20.

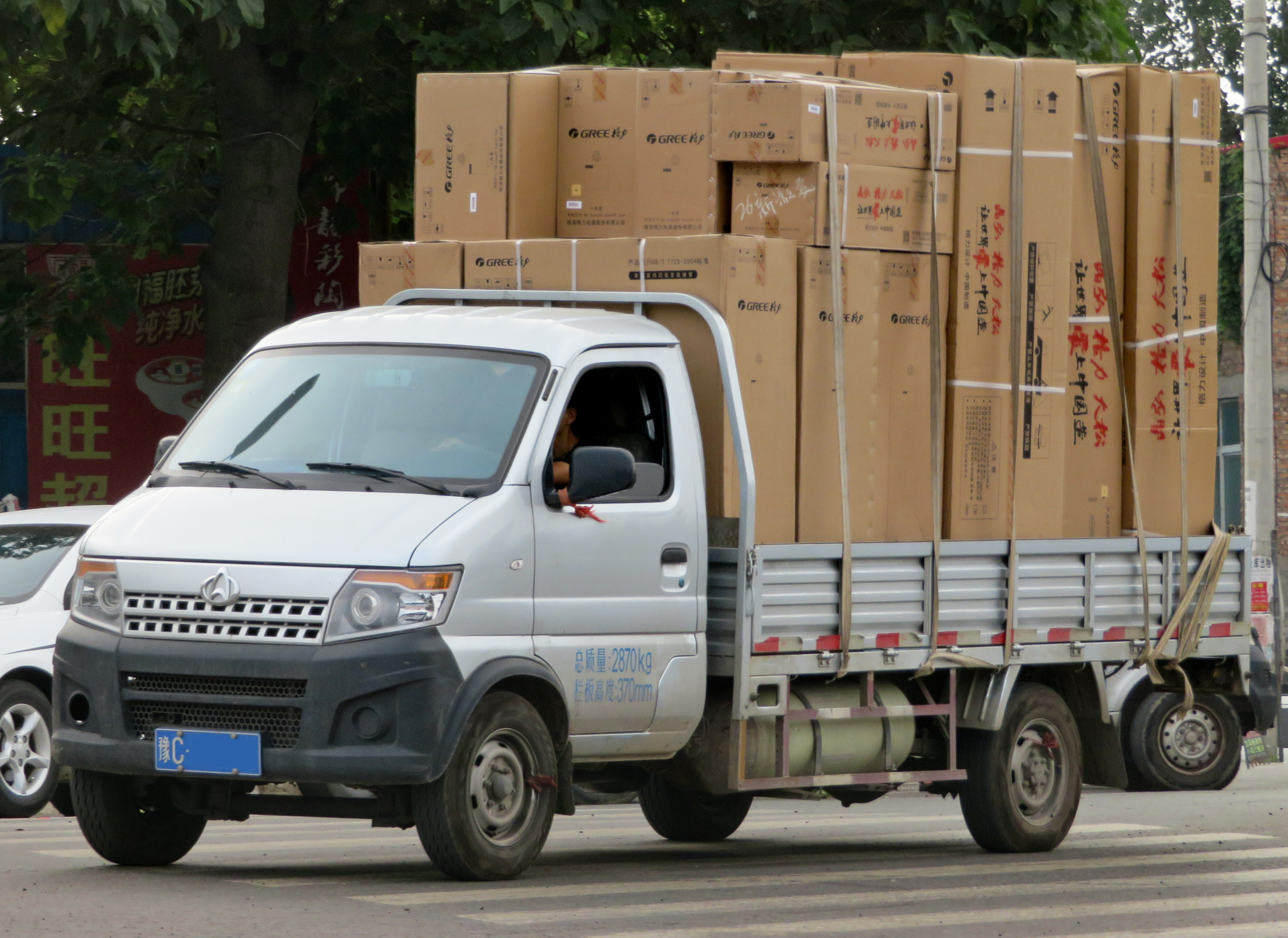
Kaicene Shenqi T20 single cab pickup

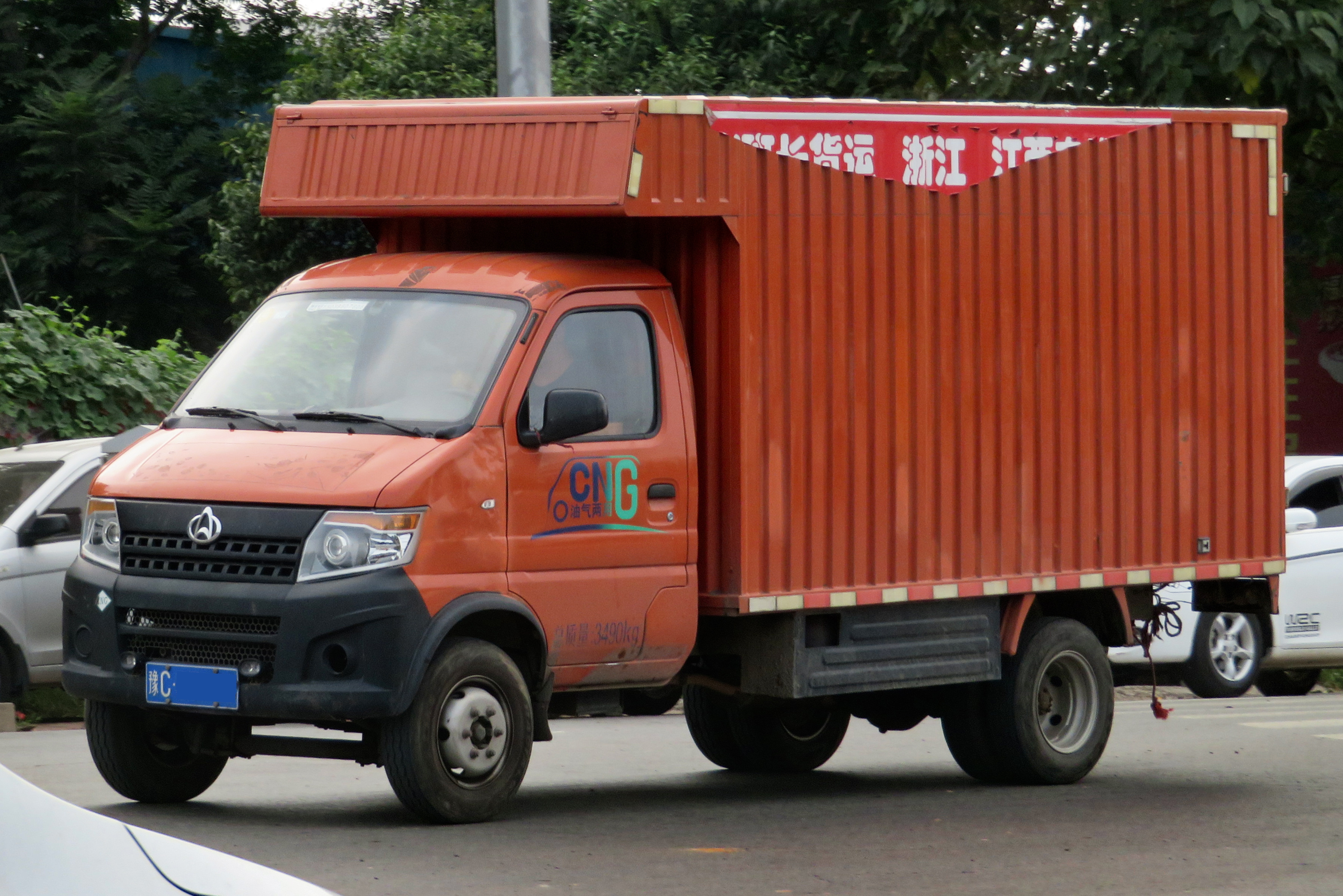
Kaicene Shenqi T20 single cab box van

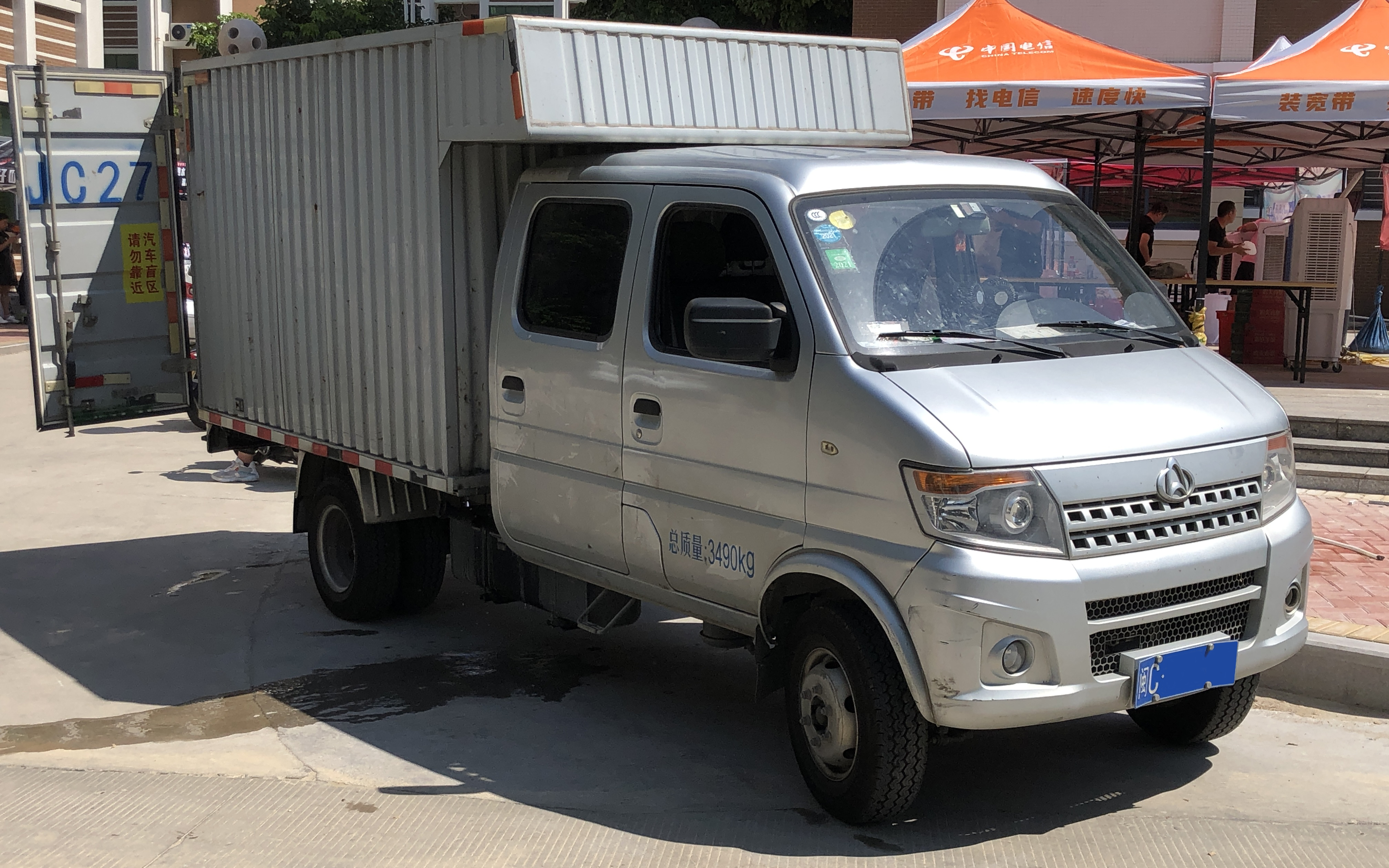
Kaicene Shenqi T20 crew cab

=== Kuayue Xinbao Mini and Kuayue Xunlong ===
A series of pickup variant was sold under the Kuayue brand as it's entry level model called the Kuayue Xinbao Mini.

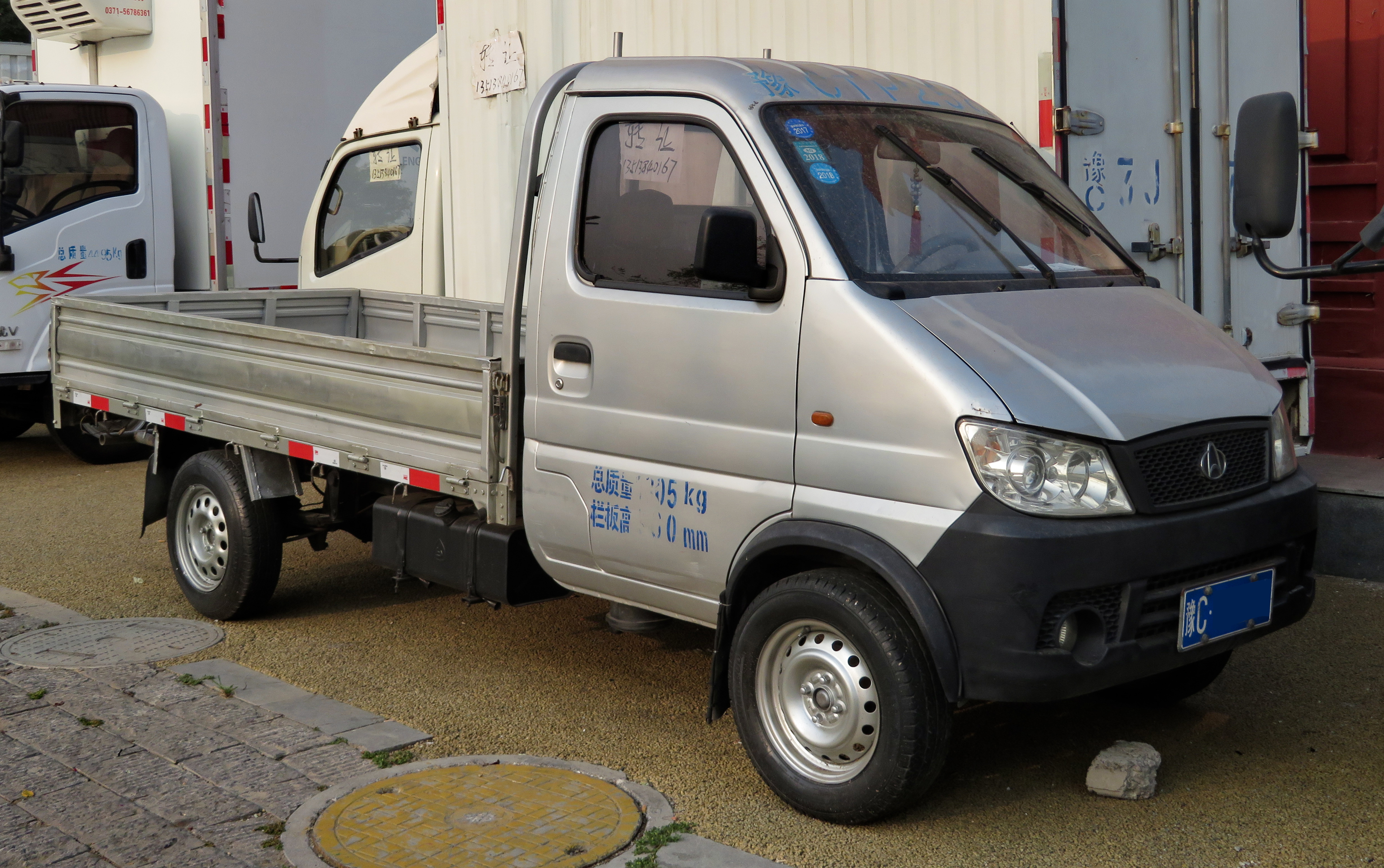
2015 Kuayue Xinbao mini single cab pickup

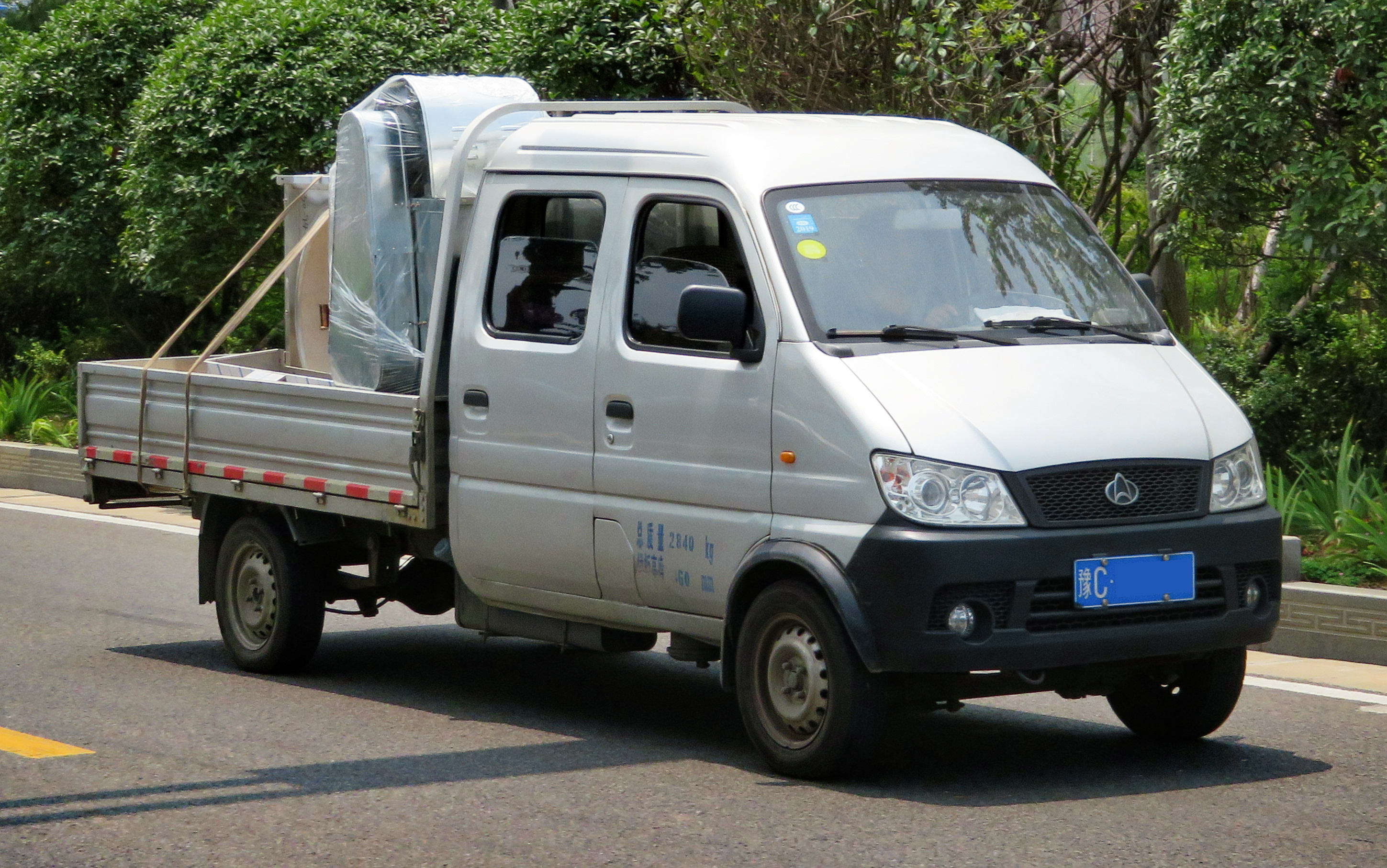
2016 Kuayue Xinbao mini crew cab pickup

2017 Kuayue Xinbao mini crew cab pickup

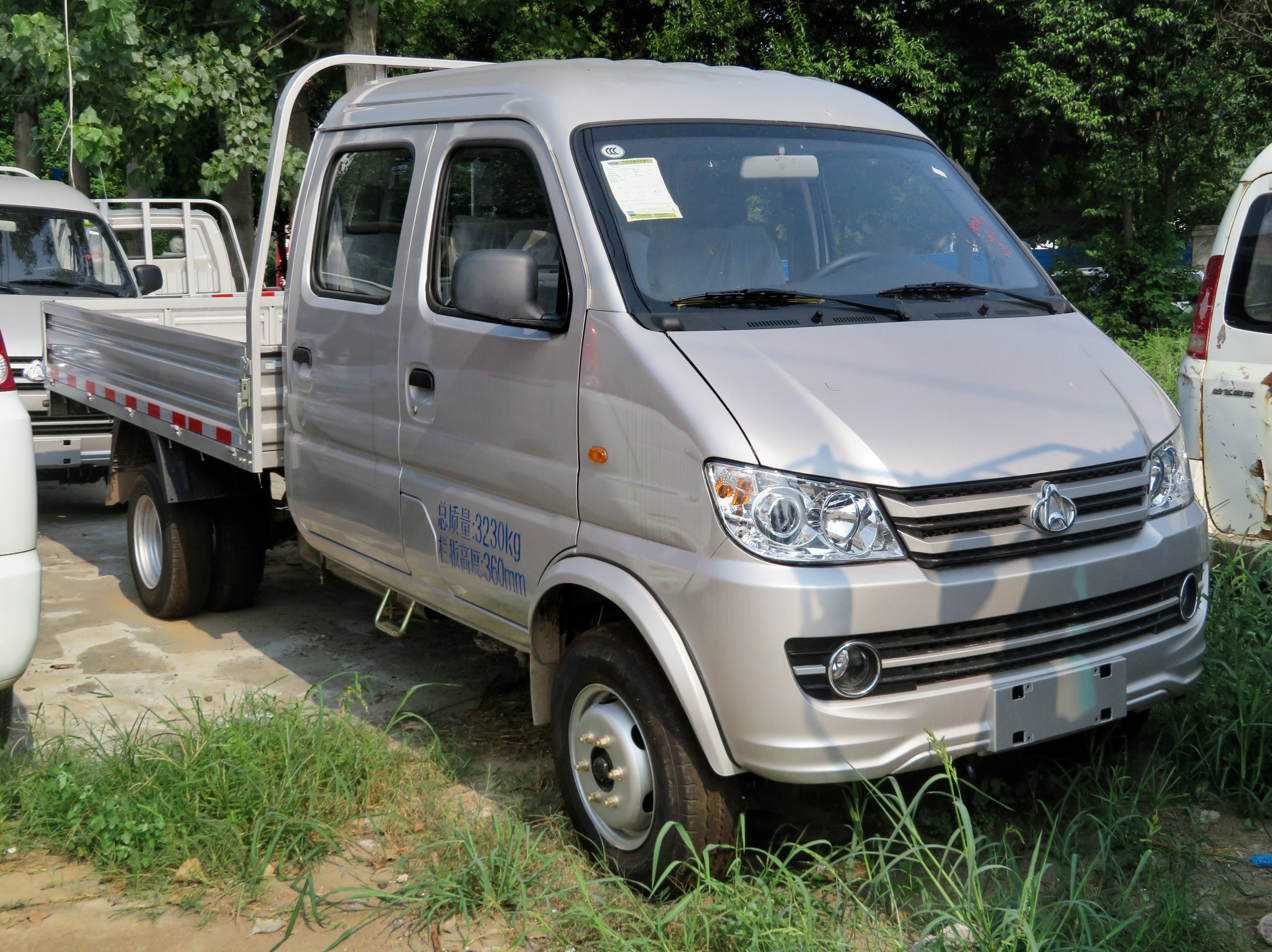
2018 Kuayue Xinbao mini crew cab

2018 Kuayue Xinbao mini single cab box truck

An additional extended van variant is called the Kuayue Xunlong.

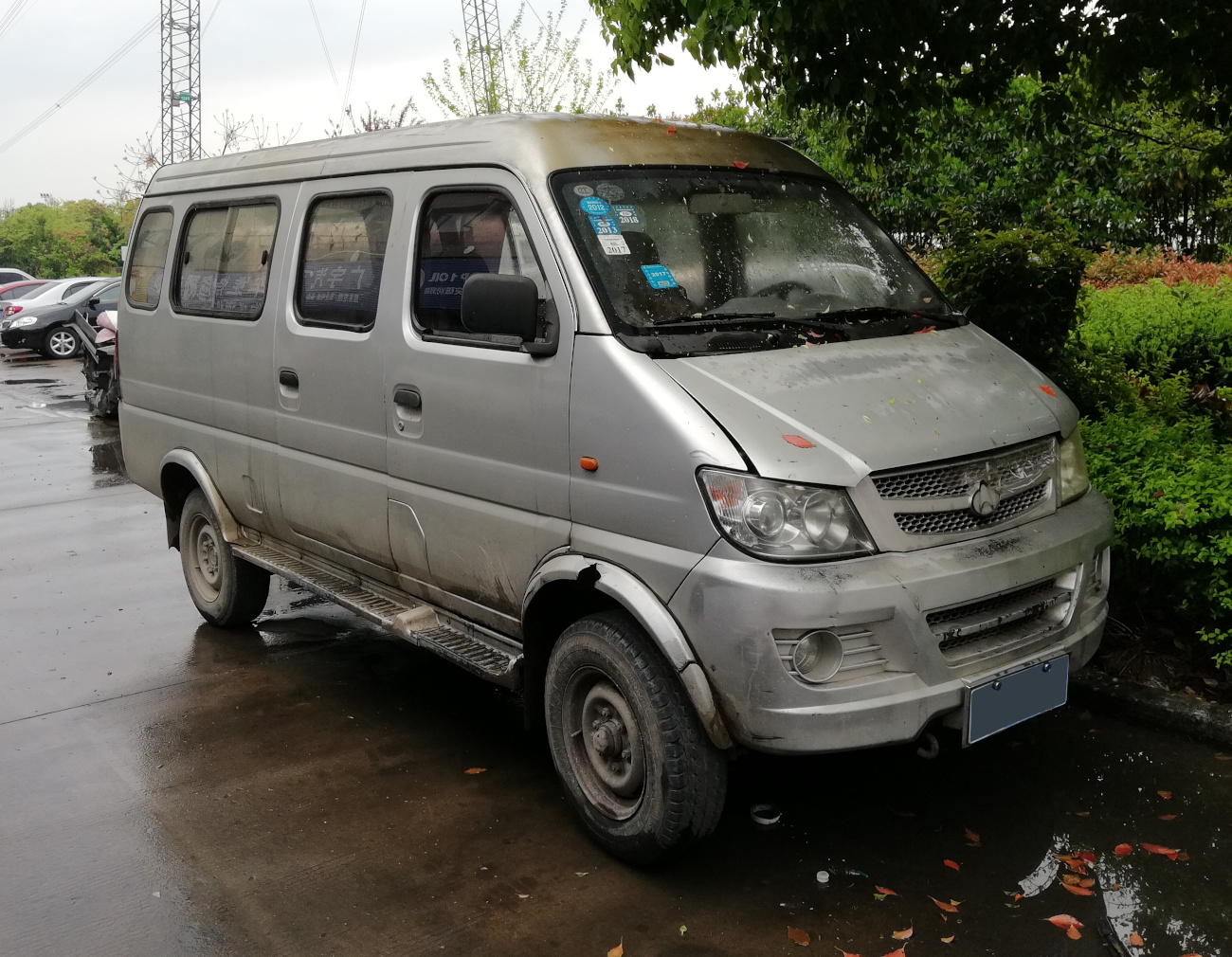
Kuayue Xunlong

Rear

== Chana Star 2 (2007–2012) ==
Chana Star 2
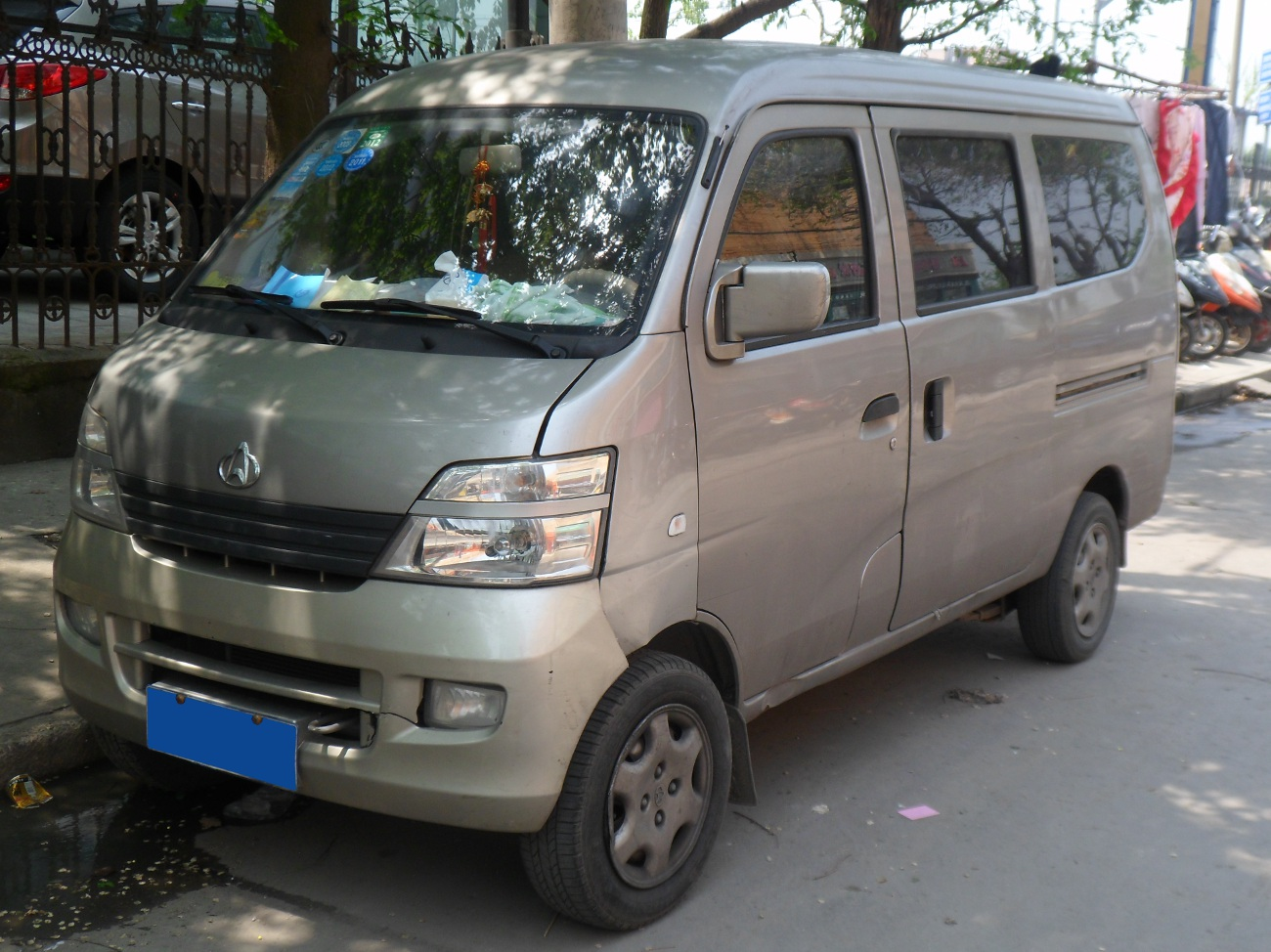

Overview
- Manufacturer: Changan Automobile
- Production: 2007–2012
- Assembly: Chongqing, China

Body and chassis
- Class: Microvan
- Body style: 4-door minivan
- Layout: FMR layout

Powertrain
- Engine: 1.0 L JL466QG/Q9 I4; 1.3 L JL474QH I4
- Transmission: 5-speed manual

Dimensions
- Wheelbase: 2,500 mm (98.4 in)
- Length: 3,860 mm (152.0 in)
- Width: 1,580 mm (62.2 in)
- Height: 1,900 mm (74.8 in)

The Chana Star 2 is the second generation of the Chana Star microvan. The Star 2 was built by the Hebei subsidiary: Changan Automobile. Deliveries of the second generation microvans started in 2007, with a list price of 38,800 Yuan.

The Chana Star 2 features a longer wheelbase than the Chana Star, and also features a more powerful 1.0 liter engine. Power windows and electric sliding doors, front fog lamps, remote key and alloy wheels are all available on higher trim levels. The price of the Chana Star 2 ranges from 31,900 yuan to 46,800 yuan in China.

In 2013, a total of 24,800 units of the Chana Star 2 were sold in China.

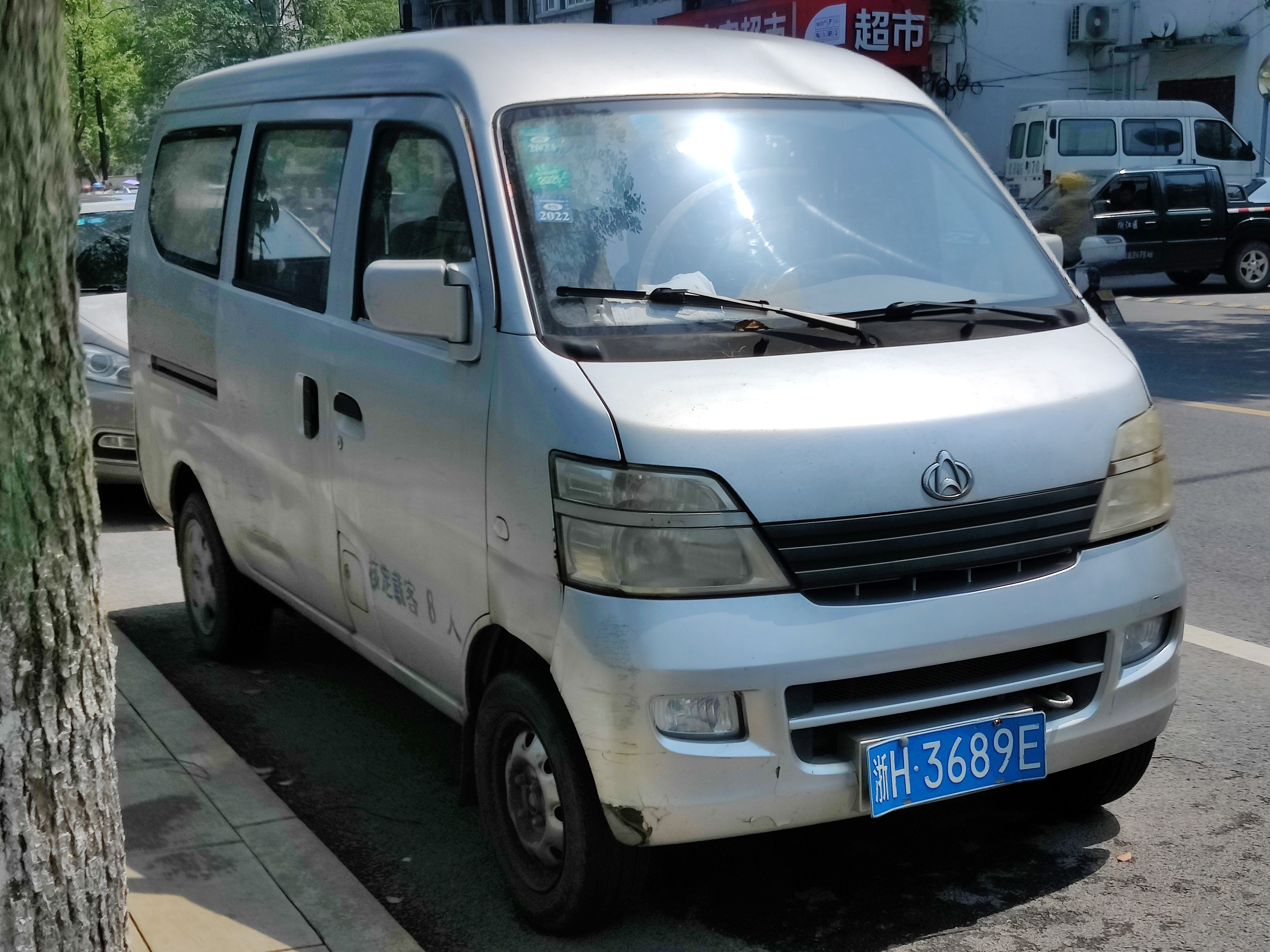
Chana Star 2 pre-facelift

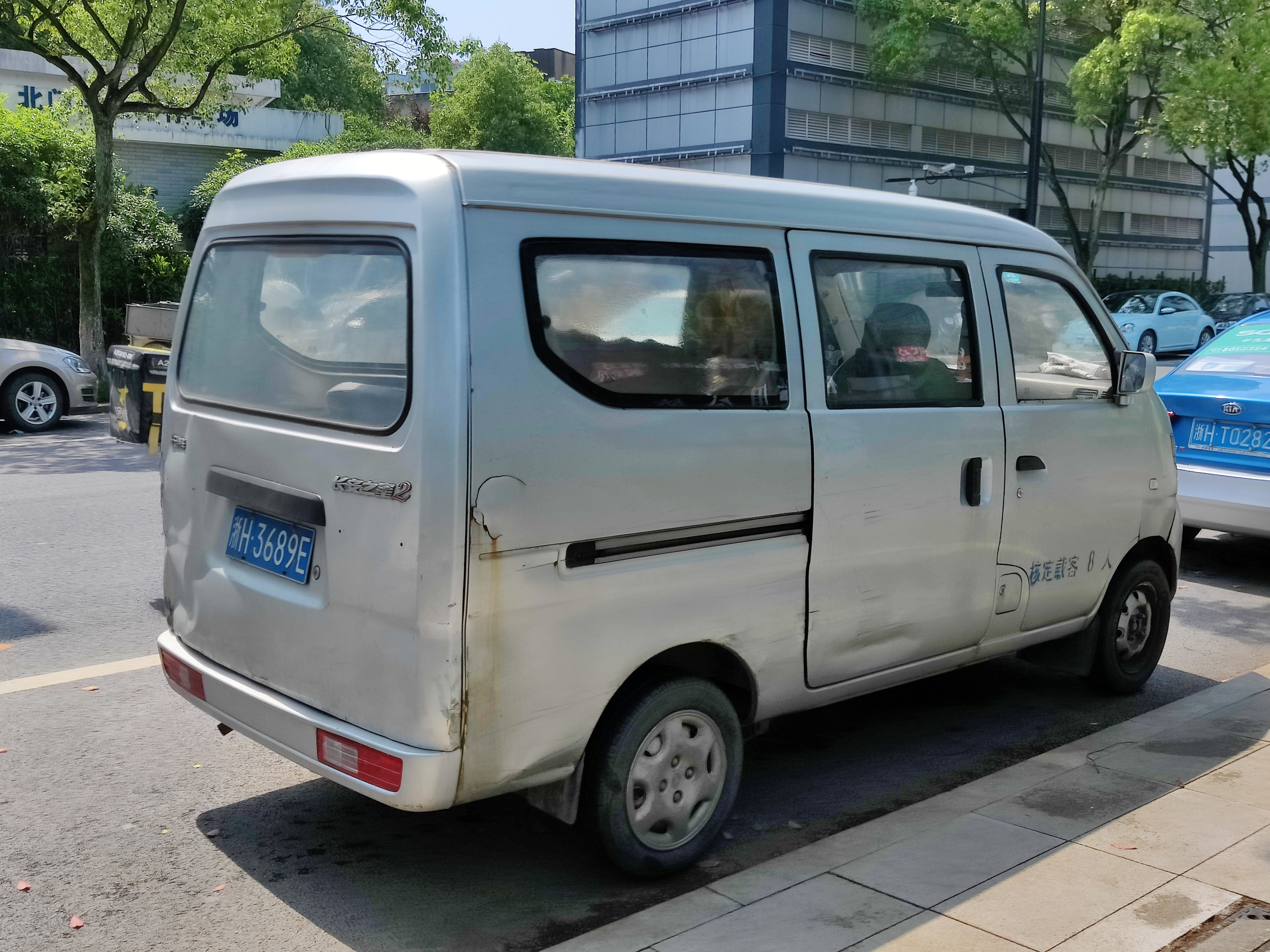
Chana Star 2 pre-facelift
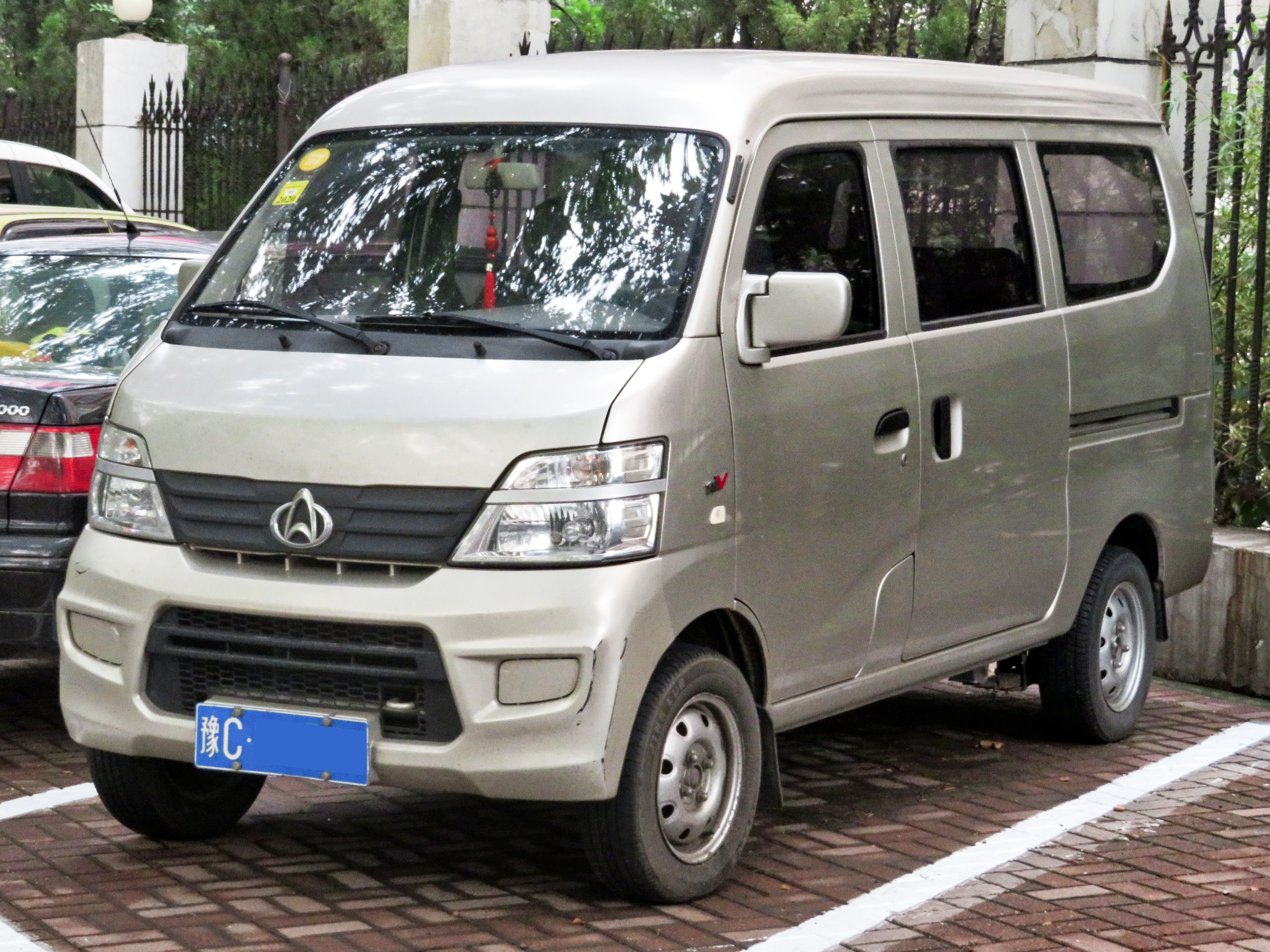
Chana Star 2 facelift

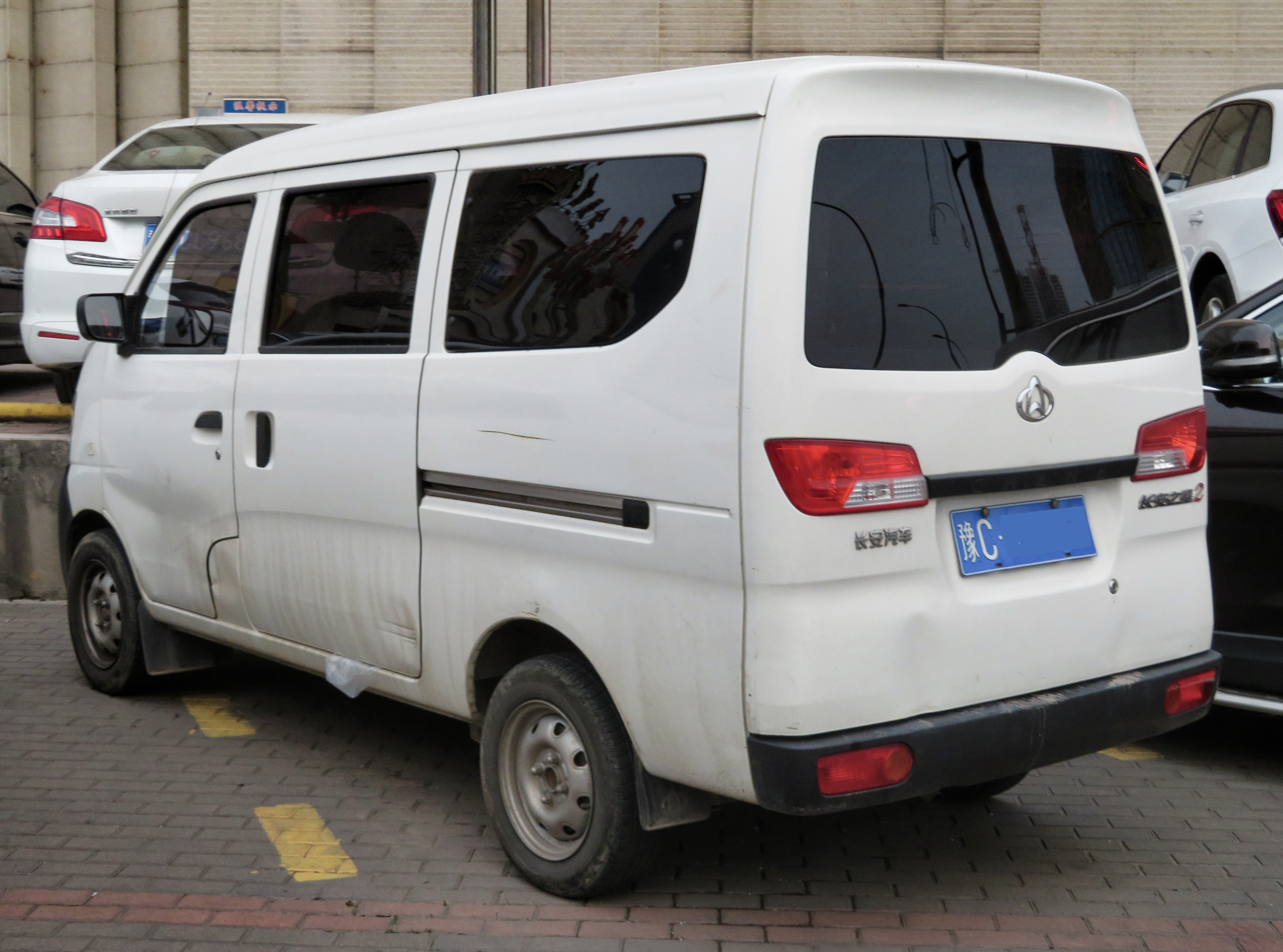
Chana Star 2 facelift

== Chana Star 5 (2012–present) ==
Chana Star 5
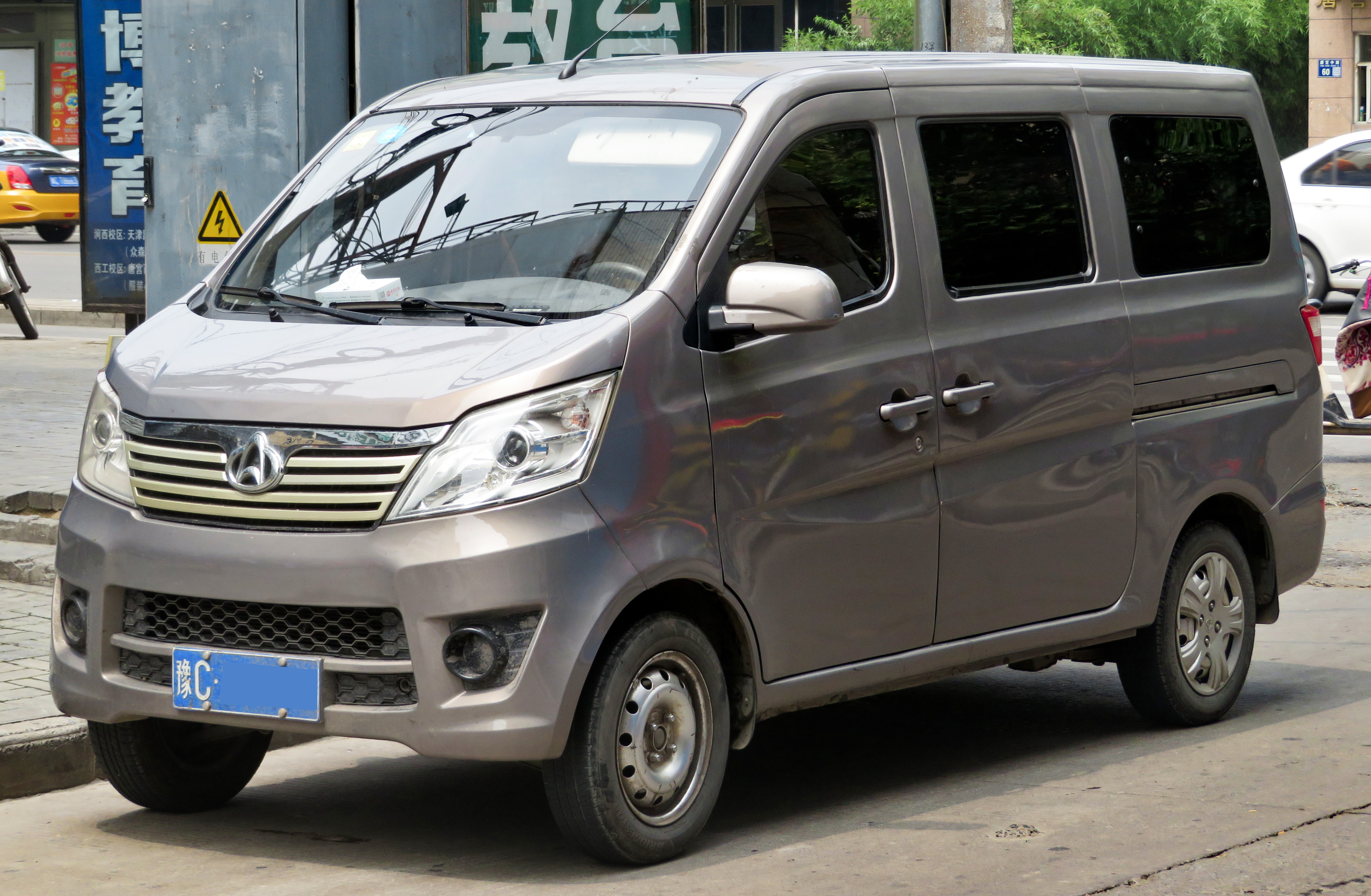

Overview
- Manufacturer: Changan Automobile
- Also called: Kaicene Star 5 Changan Star Xingka S201; Kaicene Shenqi T10 (pickup, China); Esemka Bima 1.2 (pickup, Indonesia); Chana Era Star II (Malaysia); Changan Karvaan (van, Pakistan); Changan M9 (pickup, Pakistan); Changan MD201 (Chile); Daehan Tera-S (pickup, Laos); Daehan Tera Star (pickup, Laos); Teraco Tera 100/S (pickup, Vietnam); Teraco Tera Star/Star Plus (pickup, Vietnam); TIRSAM Mini Truck (Pickup, Algeria)
- Production: 2012–present
- Assembly: Chongqing, China; Boyolali, Indonesia (Esemka); Karachi, Pakistan (Master Motors Limited Changan); Petaling Jaya, Selangor, Malaysia (Berjaya China Motor Sdn Bhd); Batna, Algeria (TIRSAM)

Body and chassis
- Class: Commercial Van
- Body style: 4-door minivan 2-door pickup 4-door pickup
- Layout: FMR layout
- Related: Hafei Zhongyi V5

Powertrain
- Engine: 999 cc JL466Q9 I4; 1243 cc E12 I4
- Transmission: 5-speed manual

Dimensions
- Wheelbase: 2,560 mm (100.8 in)
- Length: 3,980 mm (156.7 in)
- Width: 1,620 mm (63.8 in)
- Height: 1,890 mm (74.4 in)
- Curb weight: 1,130–1,730 kg (2,491–3,814 lb)

In 2012, the Changan M201 replaced the Chana Star 2 microvan, the third-generation of the Chana Star microvan, called the Xin Chana Star in China.

The Chana Star 5 was sold in China as the Xin Chana Star (新长安之星). Prices of the Chana Star 5 range from 25,000 yuan to 50,900 yuan in China.

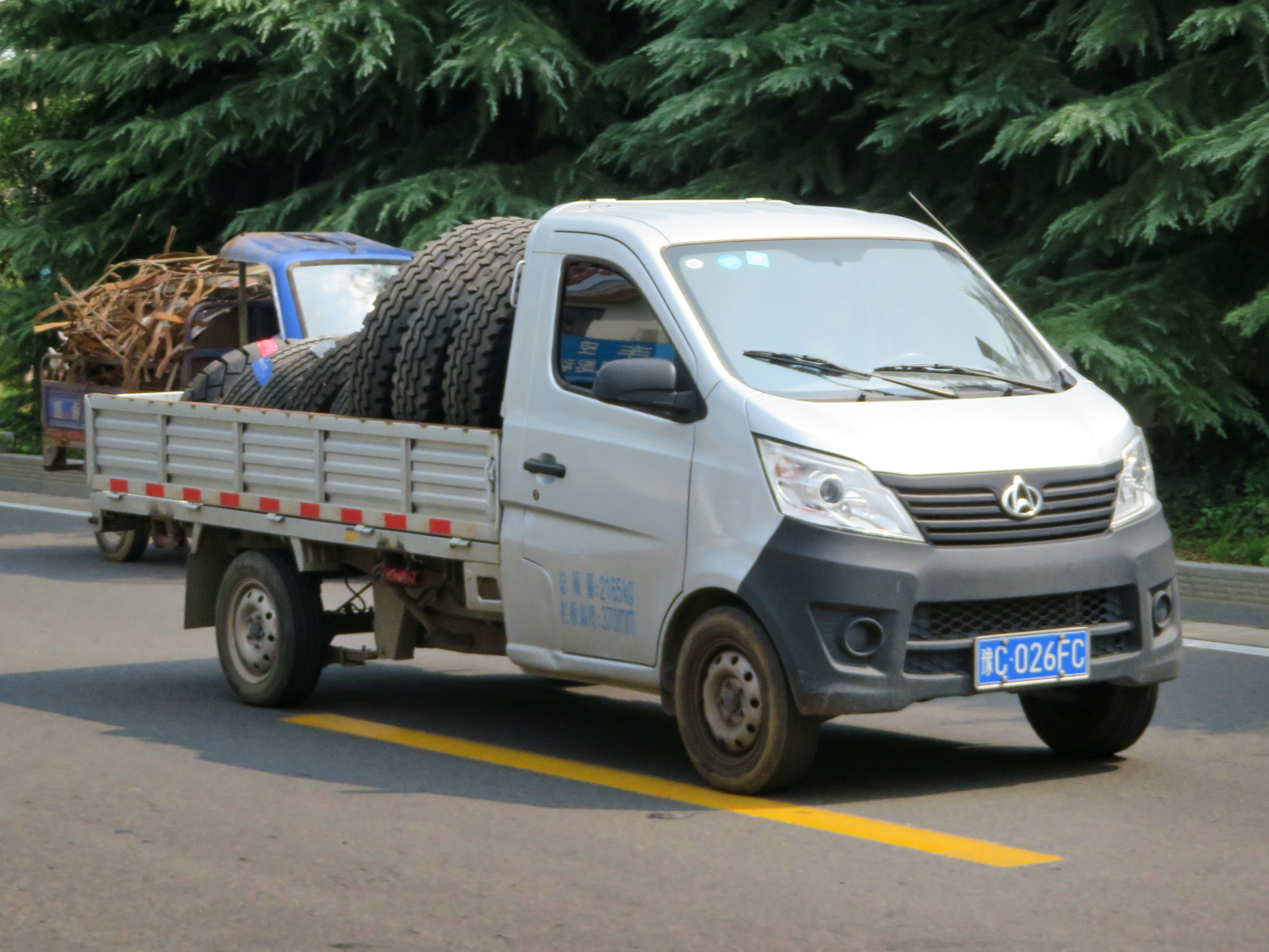
Changan Star Xingka S201 single cab

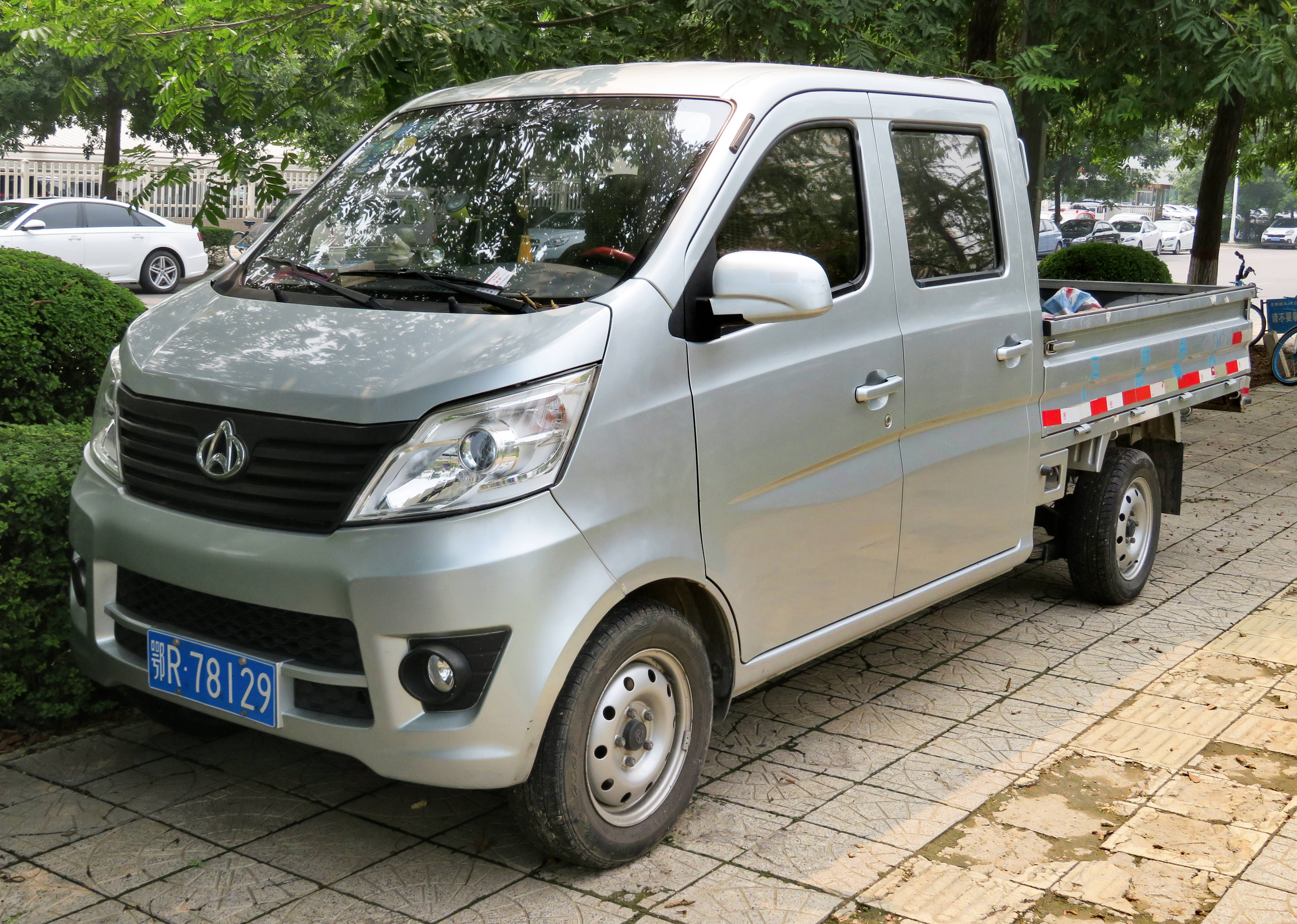
Changan Star Xingka S201 double cab

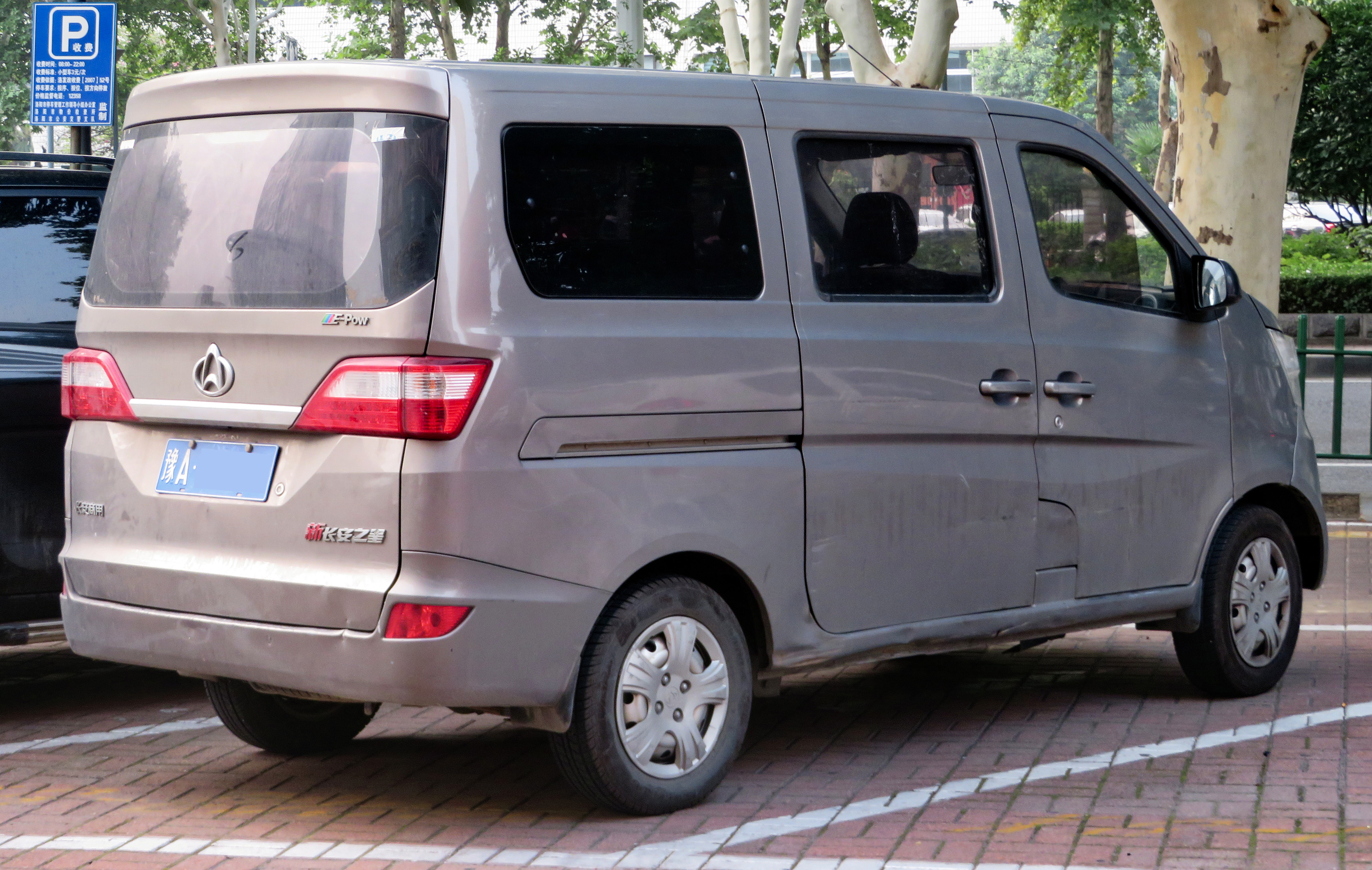
Changan Xin Chana Star rear

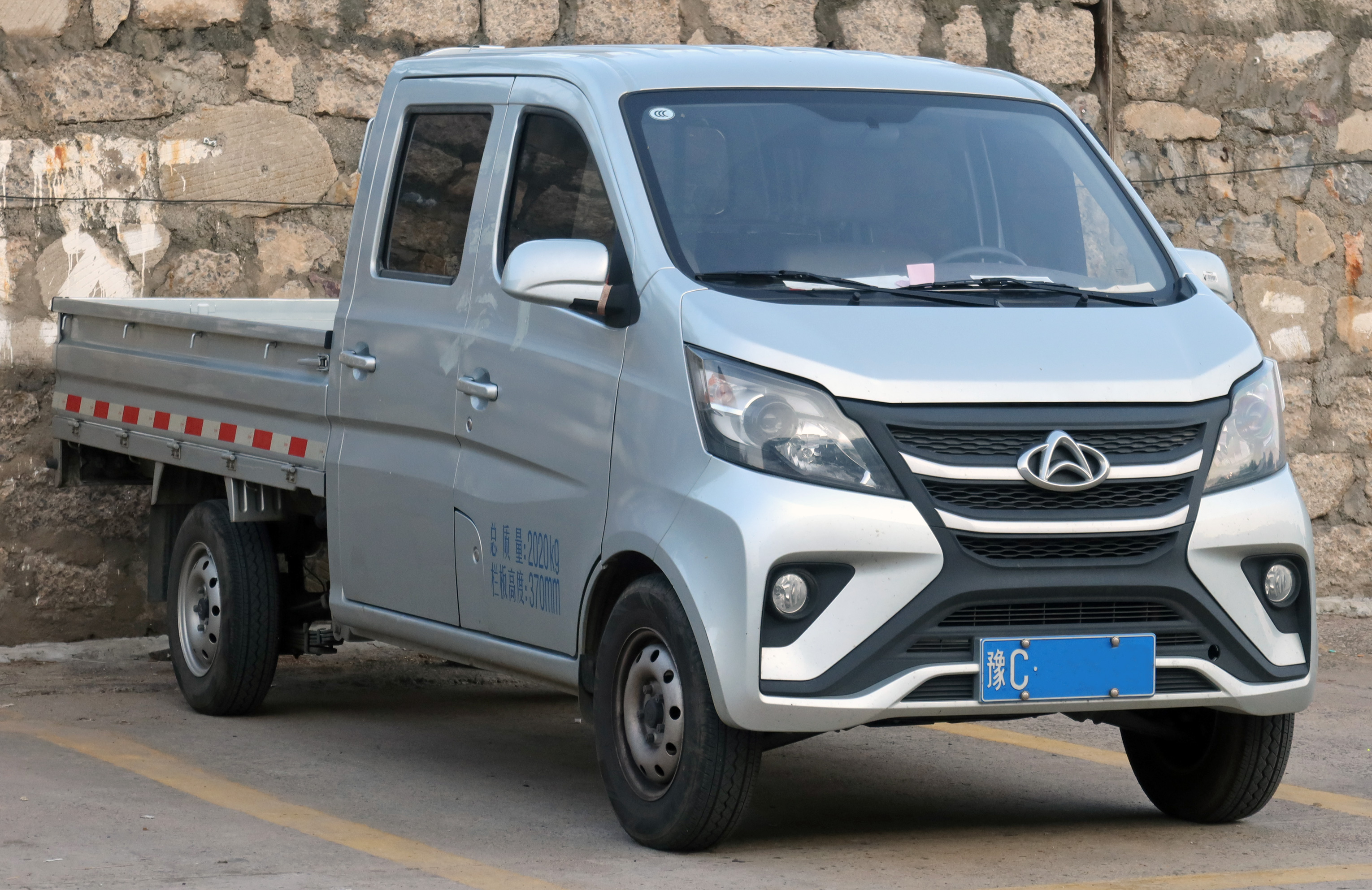
Changan Star Xingka S201 facelift

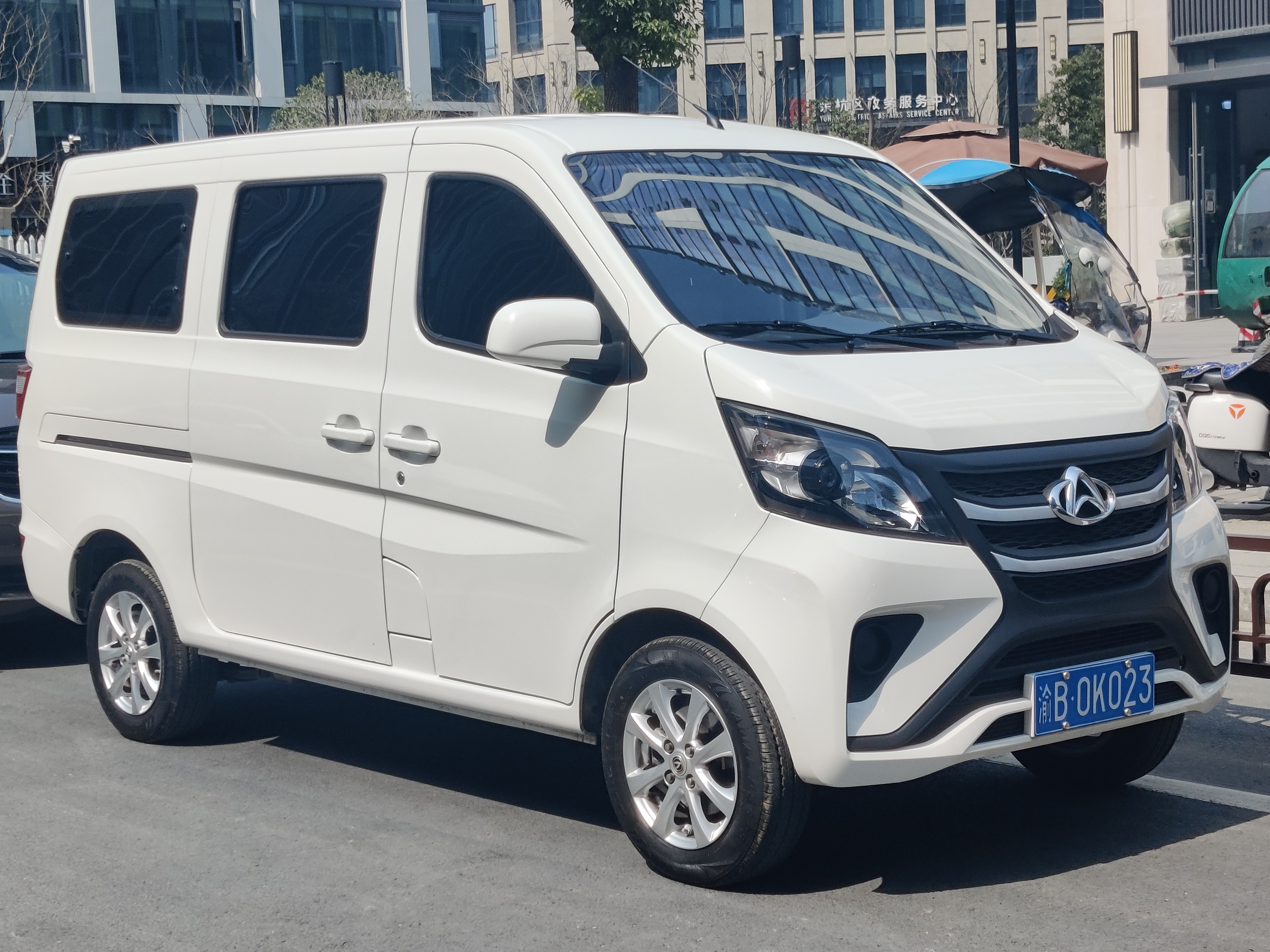
Changan Star 5 facelift front

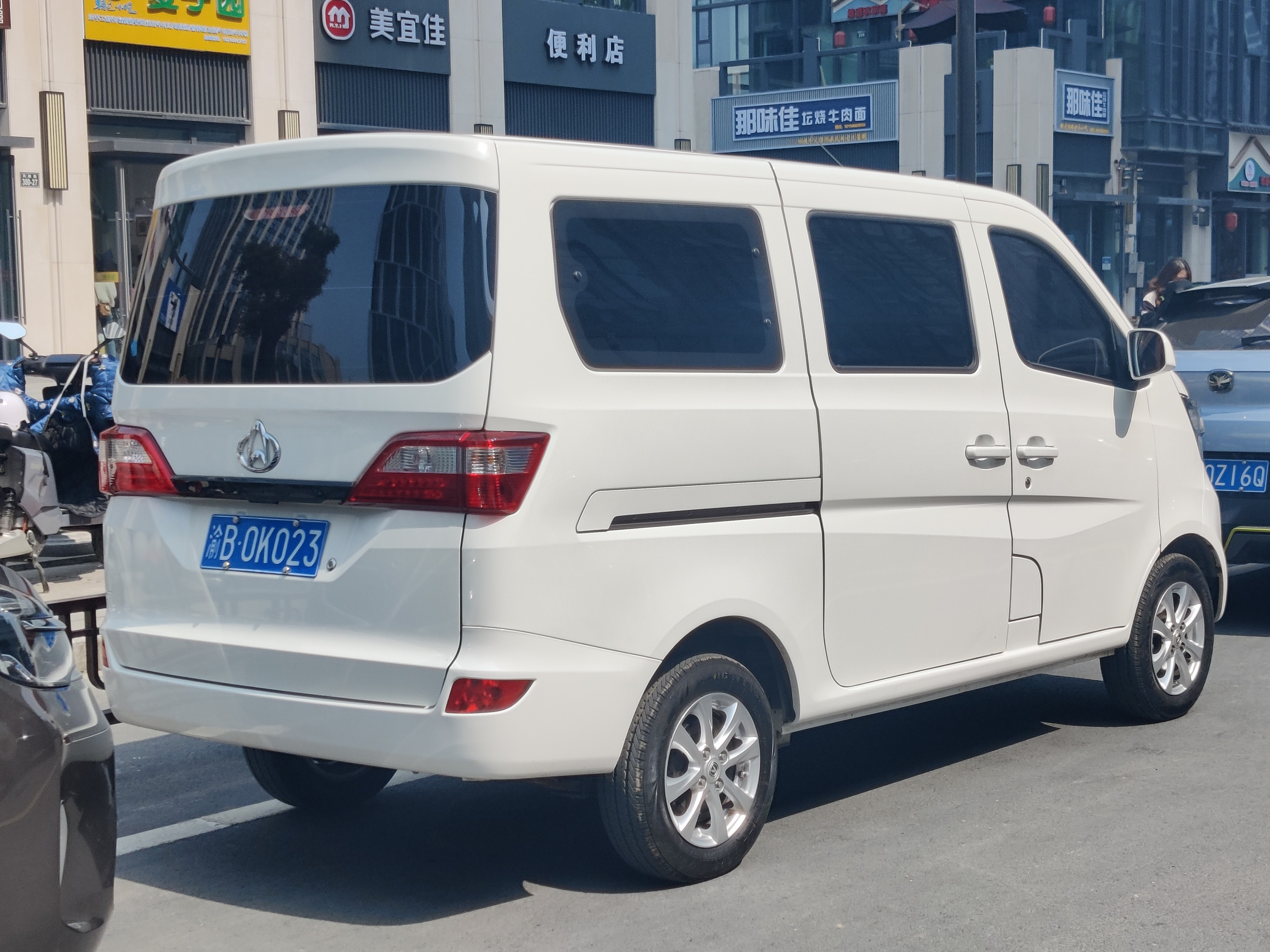
Changan Star 5 facelift rear

=== Safety ===
ASEAN NCAP test results CHANA ERA STAR II (2019)
Test	Points
Overall:	0 /5 stars
Adult occupant:	0
Child occupant:	10.91
Safety assist:	0

== Chana Star 3 (2015–present) ==
Chana Star 3
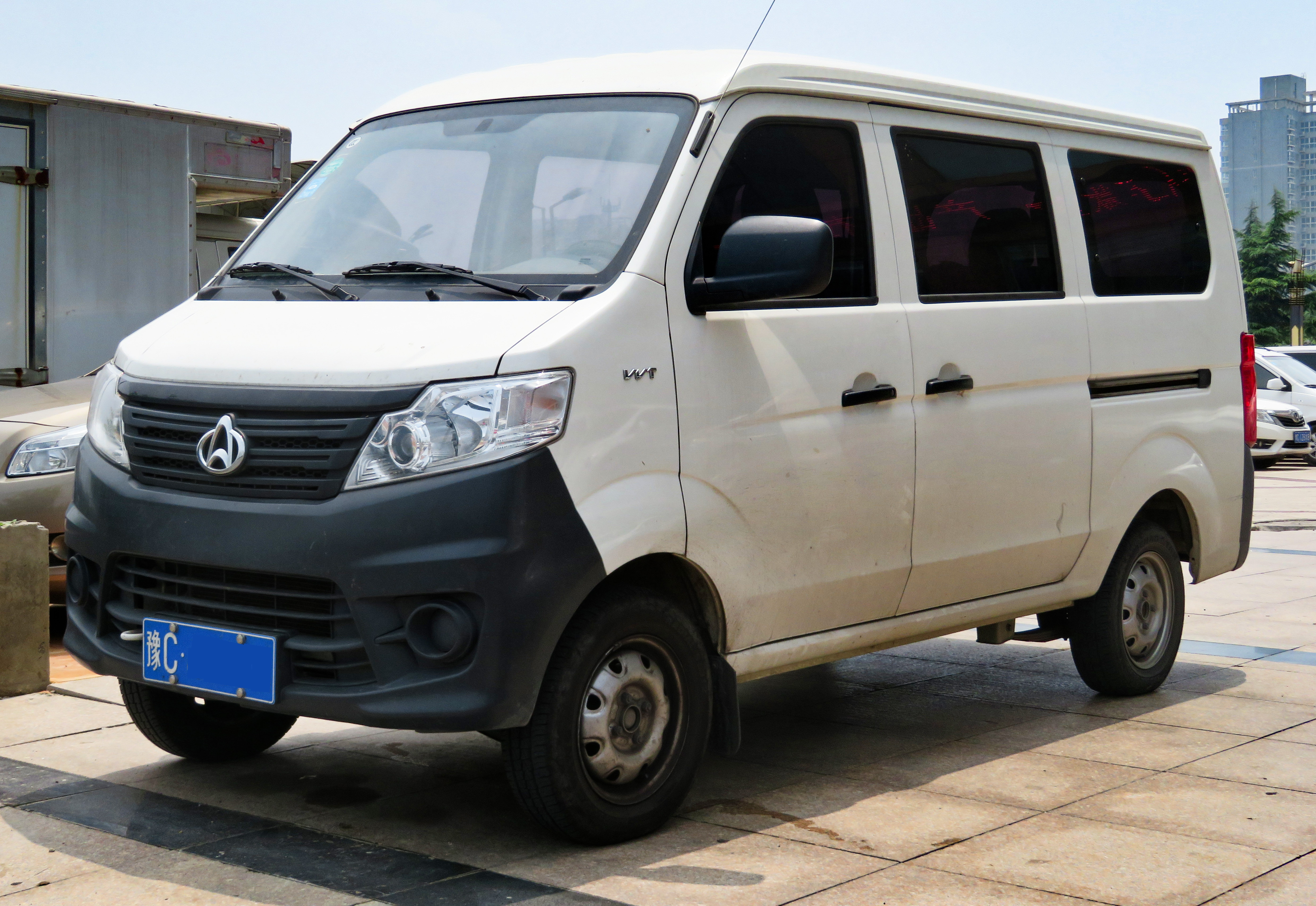

Overview
- Manufacturer: Changan Automobile
- Also called: Kaicene Star 3
- Production: 2015–present
- Assembly: Chongqing, China

Body and chassis
- Class: Microvan
- Body style: 4-door minivan
- Layout: FMR layout

Powertrain
- Engine: 1.0 L C10 I4; 1.2 L EA12V I4
- Transmission: 5-speed manual

Dimensions
- Wheelbase: 2,500 mm (98.4 in)
- Length: 3,930 mm (154.7 in)
- Width: 1,540 mm (60.6 in)
- Height: 1,890 mm (74.4 in)
- Curb weight: 1,095 kg (2,414 lb)

The Star 3 is produced by Changan Automobile in Hebei. Launched in 2015, the Star 3 is the direct successor of the original Chana Star. The Star 3 is powered by a 1.0 or 1.2-litre petrol/gasoline engine. The third generation Chana Star offers up to 7 seats. The price of the Chana Star 3 ranges from 29,900 yuan to 39,900 yuan in China.

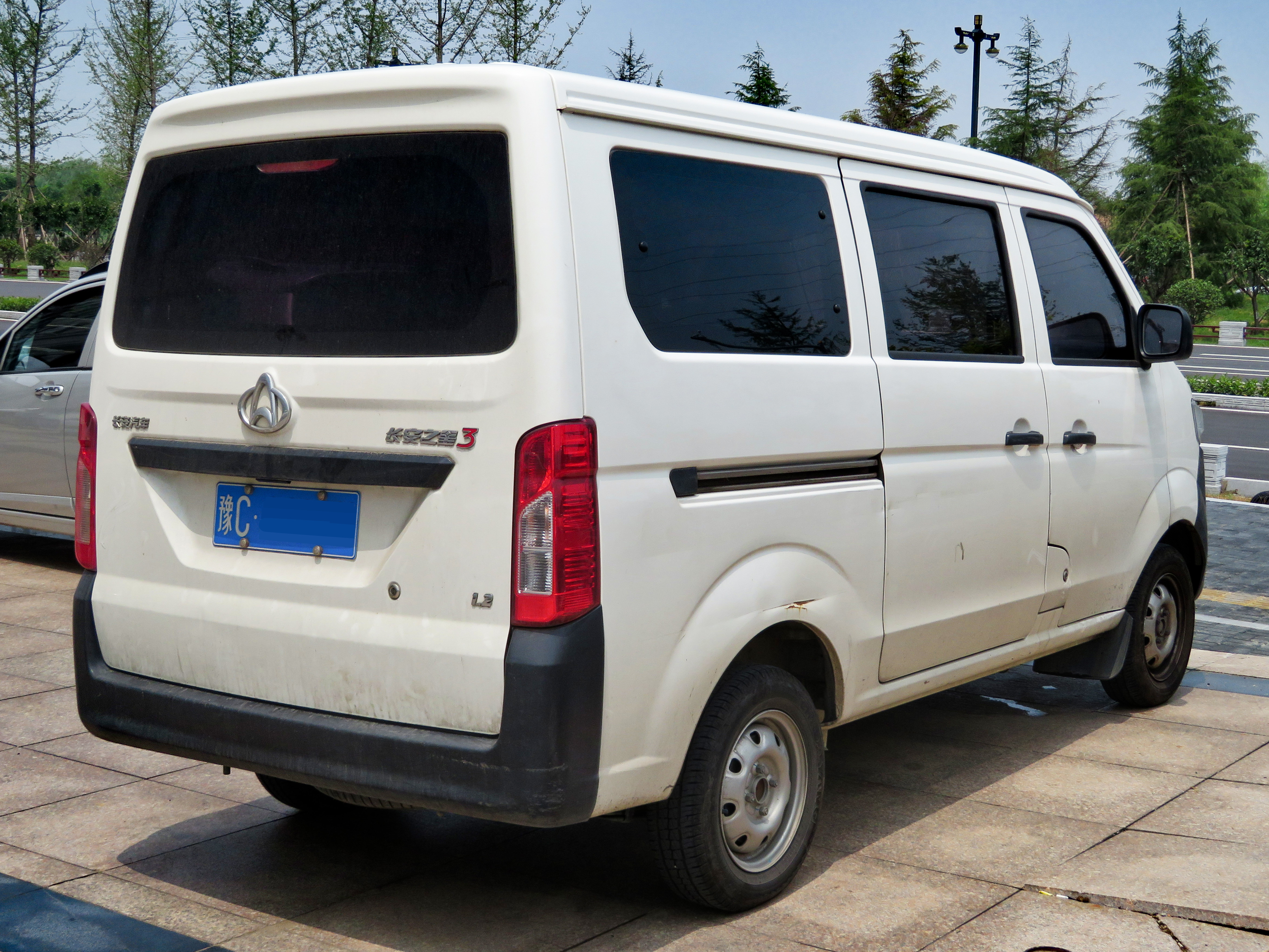
Changan Star 3 (rear)
