= Hafei Lobo =

Hafei Lobo HFJ7100/HFJ7110
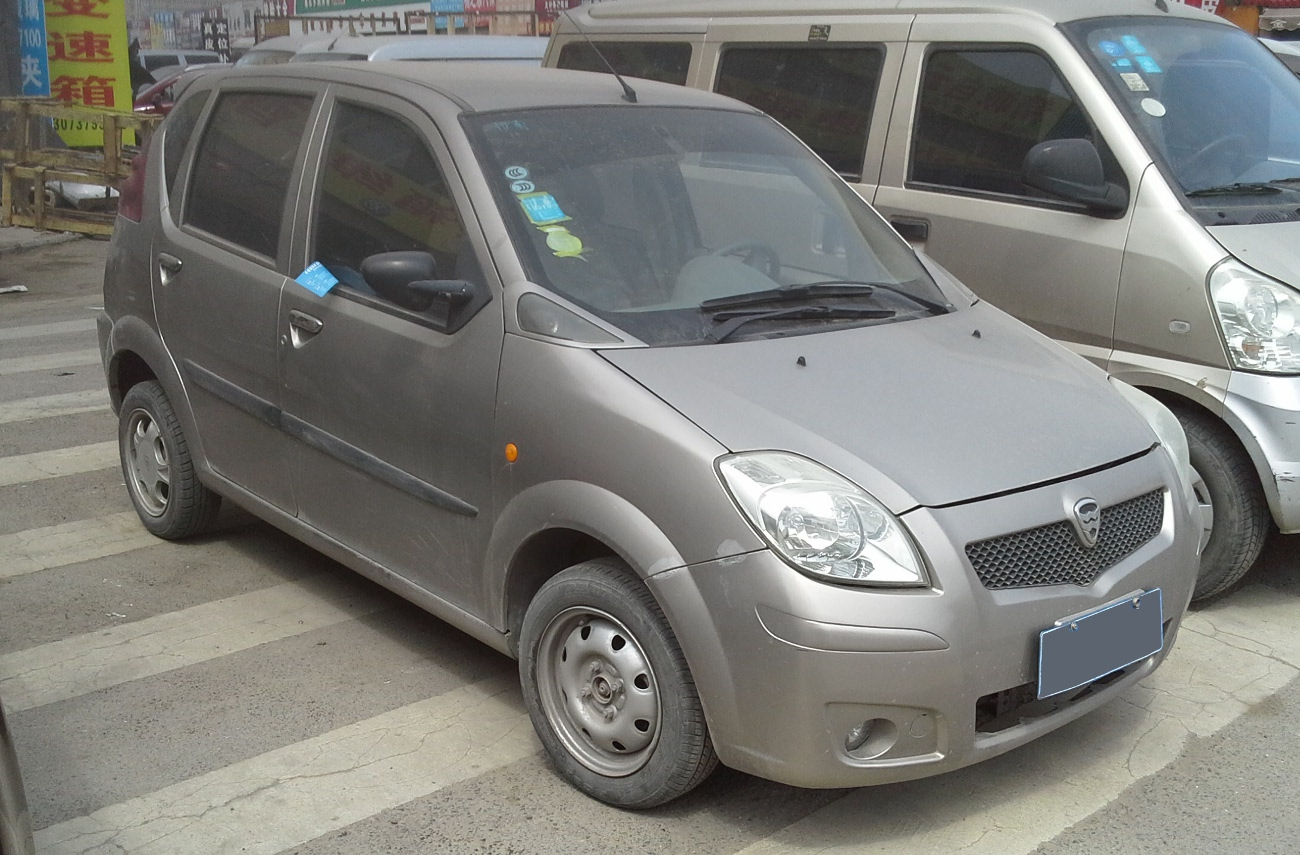
- Hafei Lobo post-facelift

Overview
- Manufacturer: Hafei Motor
- Also called: Hafei Brio (Russia); Hafei Lubao (China); Micro Trend (Sri Lanka); Naza Sutera/Forza (Malaysia)
- Production: 2002–2011; 2006–2011 (Naza)
- Assembly: Pingfang, Harbin, People's Republic of China; Gurun, Malaysia (Naza); Kashan, Iran (Khodrosazi Vesti)
- Designer: Pininfarina

Body and chassis
- Class: City car
- Body style: Hatchback
- Platform: Luobo/Lobo
- Related: Naza Sutera; Micro Trend; Mitsubishi Toppo BJ Wide

Powertrain
- Engine: 1.0 L DA465Q-2 I4; 1.0 L DAK10A I4; 1.1 L DA468Q I4; 1.3 L DA471QL I4
- Transmission: 5 speed manual 5 speed automatic

Dimensions
- Wheelbase: 2,335 mm (91.9 in)
- Length: 3,588 mm (141.3 in)
- Width: 1,563 mm (61.5 in)
- Height: 1,533 mm (60.4 in) /1,574 mm (62.0 in)
- Curb weight: 920 kg (2,028 lb)/ 895 kg (1,973 lb)

Chronology
- Predecessor: Hafei Baili

The Hafei Lobo (路宝) is a city car based on the Lubao (Lobo) design by Pininfarina produced by the Chinese manufacturer Hafei Motor from 2002 to 2011.

== Overview ==
The chassis of the Hafei Lobo is sourced from British company Lotus. The design shares similarities with the 1999 Pininfarina Metrocubo concept.

In Russia, its name is Hafei Brio. In Sri Lanka, the car is marketed as Micro Trend by Micro Cars Limited. In Malaysia, the car is marketed as the Naza Sutera from Naza. In Thailand, Naza Sutera from Malaysia is marketed as Naza Forza.

The Hafei Lobo is available with the following two gasoline-powered engines:

- 1.0 -DA465Q-2- 8V 33.5 kW (45 hp) (Euro II)
- 1.1 -DA468Q- 16V 48 kW (64 hp)

A facelift was introduced for the 2010 model year of the Lobo, and another minor update in 2011 with the actual model being launched in 2012. The facelifted Lobo features a restyled front fascia heavily resembling the second generation Toyota Vitz hatchback, and production ended after the 2011 model year.

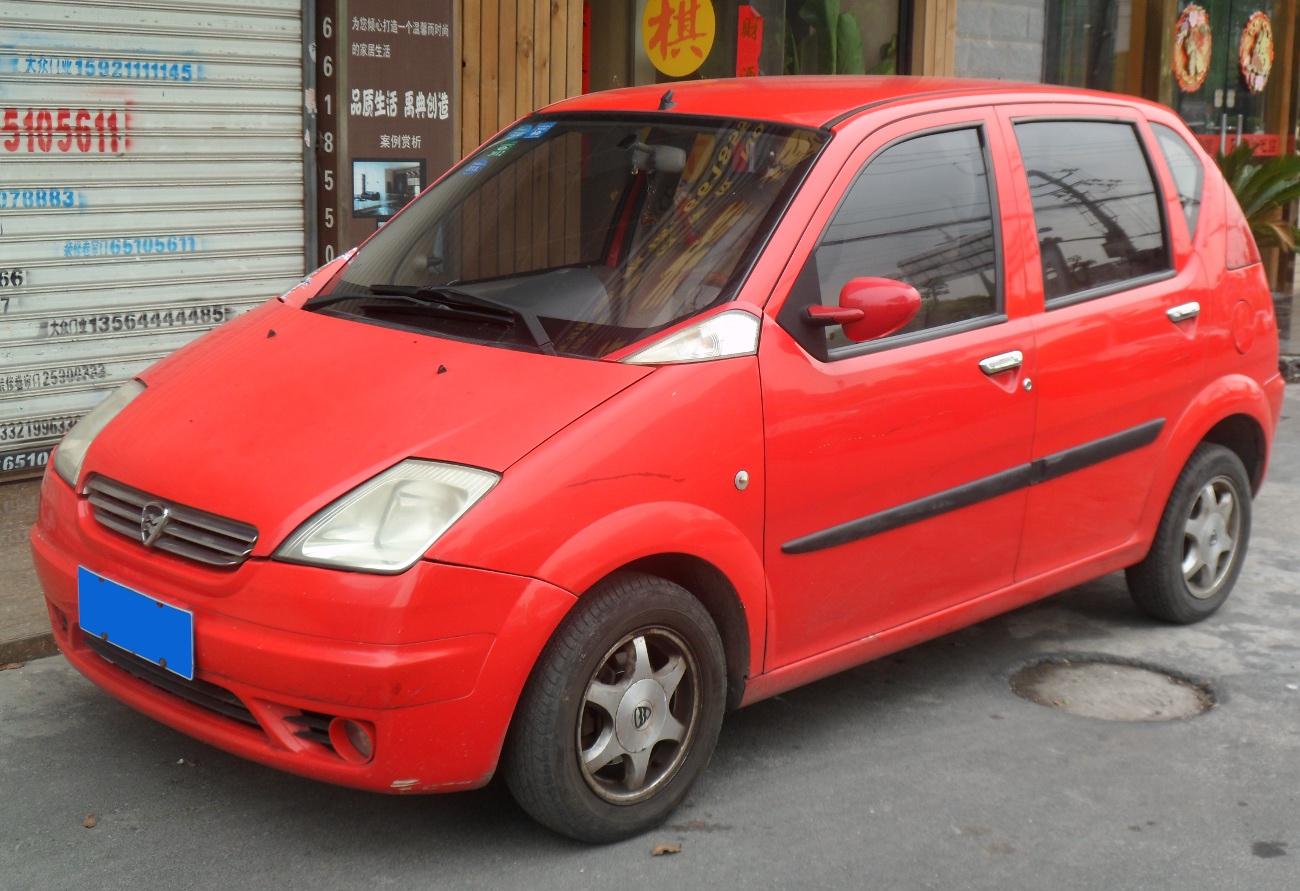
Pre-facelift front view

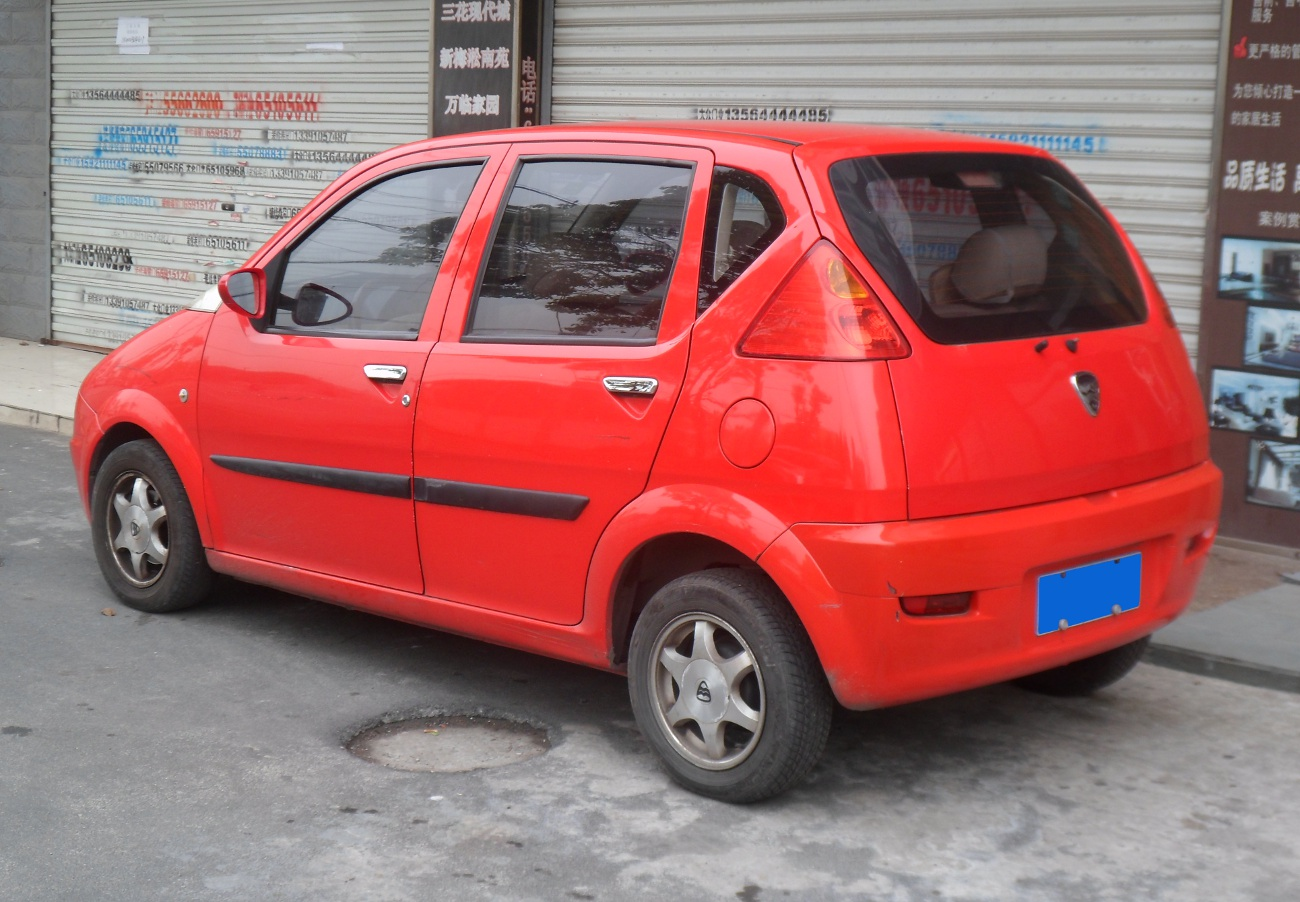
Pre-facelift rear view

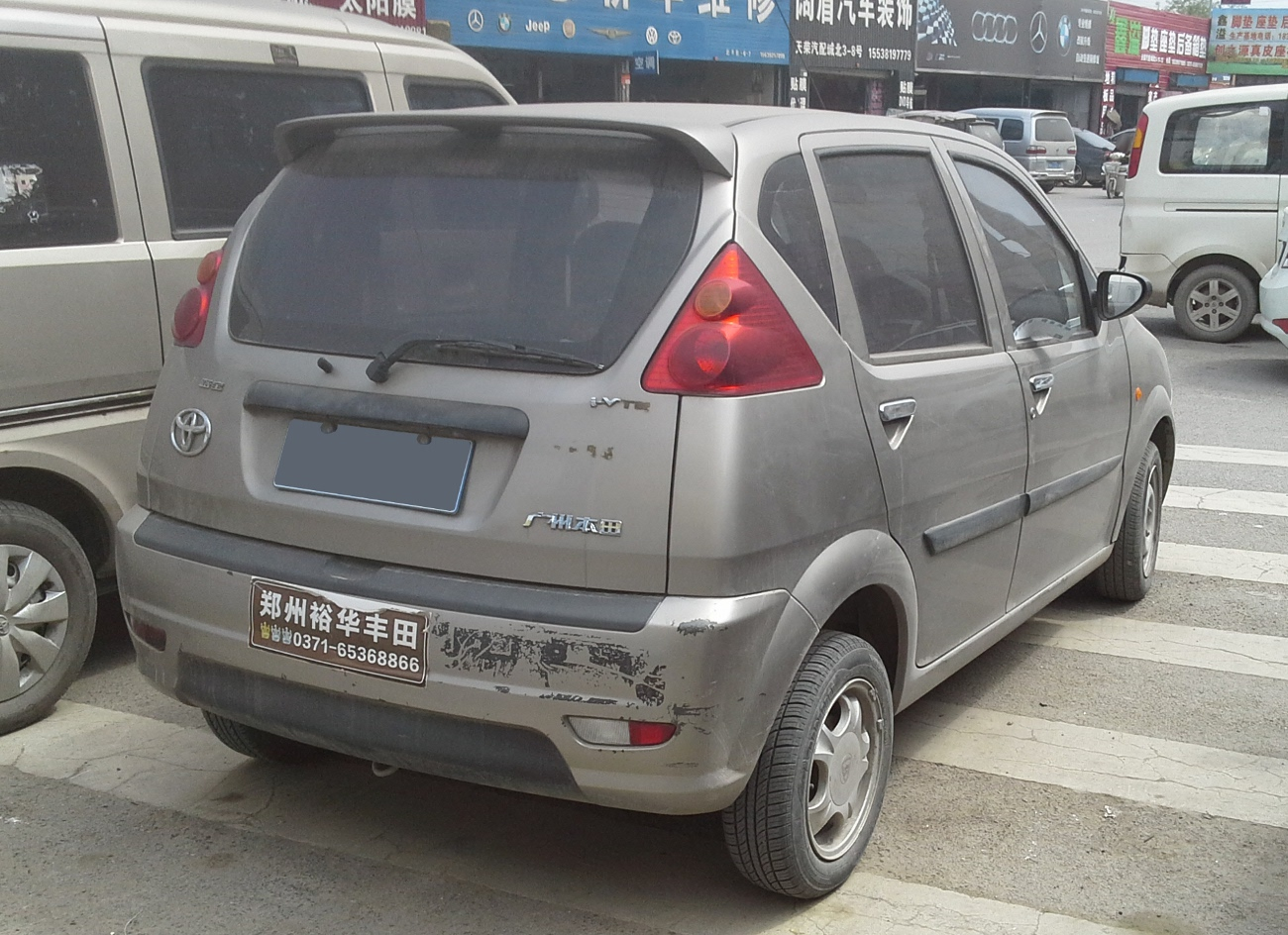
Facelifted rear view
