= Naza Sutera =

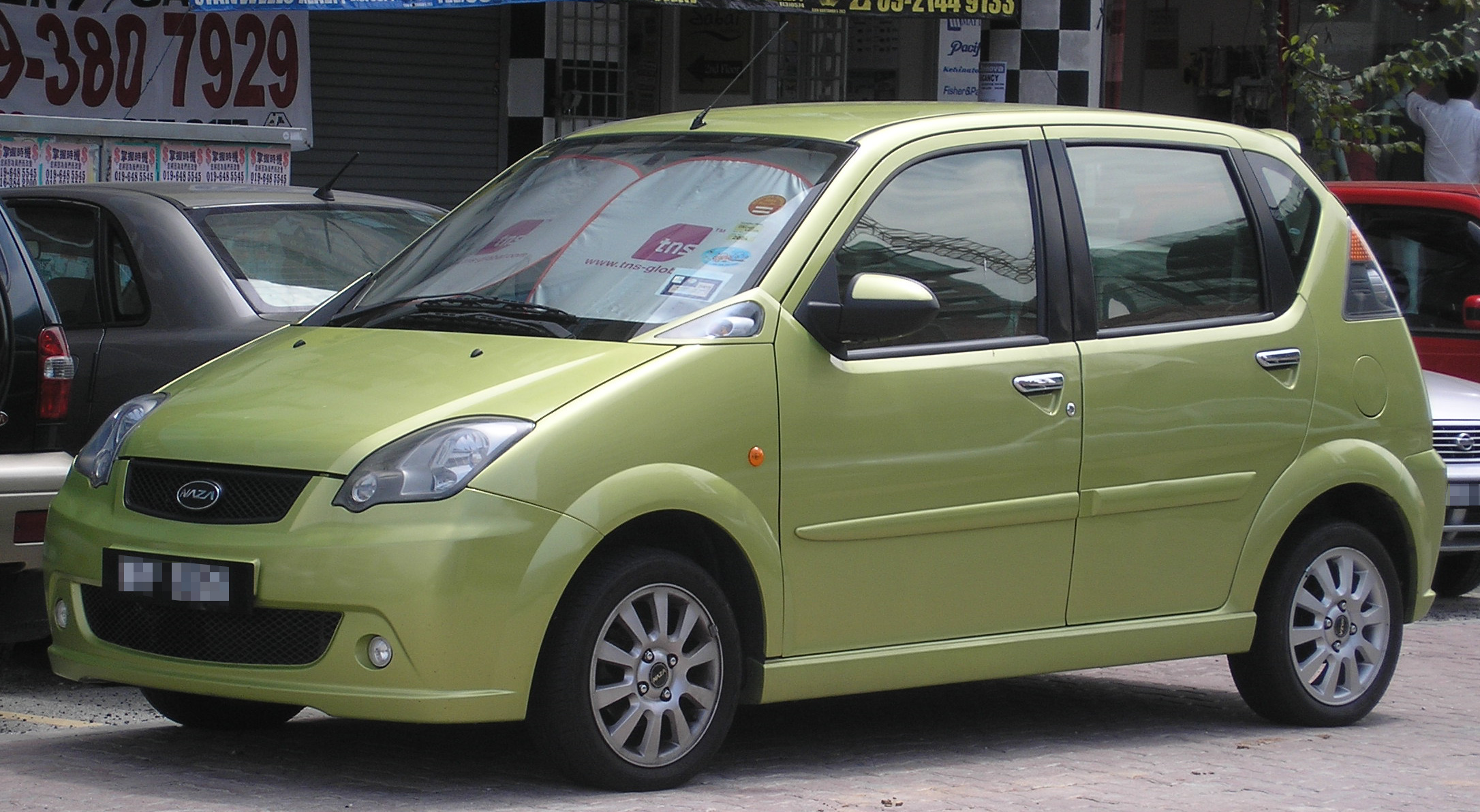

Overview
- Manufacturer: Naza
- Also called: Naza Forza
- Production: 2006–2011
- Assembly: Malaysia: Gurun (NAM)

Body and chassis
- Class: City car
- Body style: 5-door hatchback
- Related: Hafei Lobo; Micro Trend

Powertrain
- Engine: Petrol: 1.1 L HDMC I4
- Transmission: 5-speed manual

The Naza Sutera is a city car from Malaysian manufacturer Naza, and is distributed and sold by the Naza Group's new subsidiary company Naza Corporation. The Malay word "Sutera" translates as silk.

== Overview ==
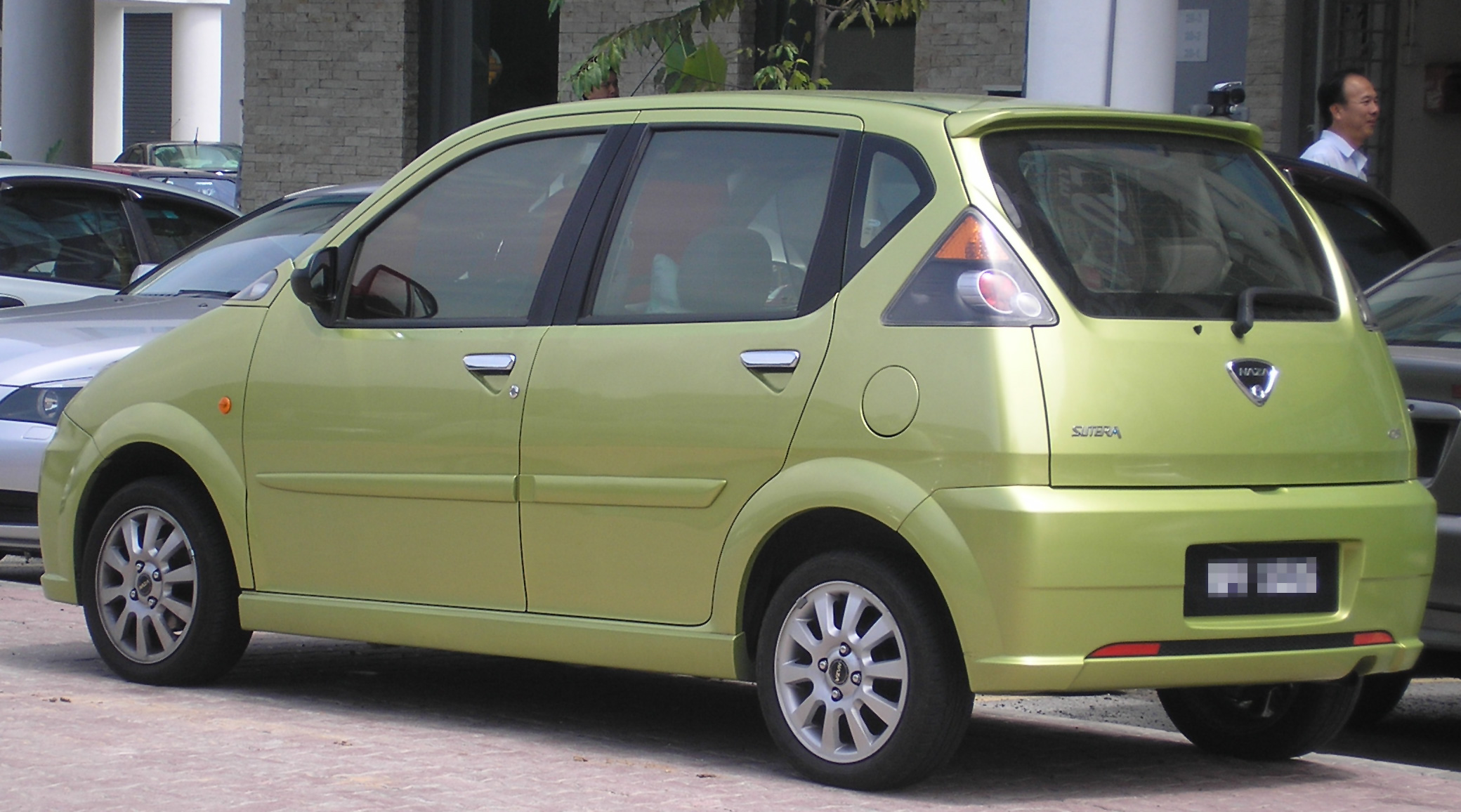
Naza Sutera (rear)

Introduced on 22 April 2006 by Malaysian Prime Minister Abdullah Badawi, the Sutera was based on the Hafei Lobo by Hafei Motor, which was styled & engineered by Pininfarina and features a Lotus-tuned suspension.

Lotus took care of the NVH (noise, vibration, and harshness), as well as ride & handling aspects of the base model. Naza R&D improved upon the base design and engineered a right-hand drive conversion, and also enhanced the front end, updating hood (with power bulge), headlights and bumper. The Minor Model Change (MMC) work was done in collaboration with LG CNS in South Korea. Engine management is by Bosch, while some of the EFI components are from Siemens VDO.

The 1.1 L straight-4 engine is an all-aluminium DOHC 16-Valve design from Harbin Dong-An Engine Manufacturing Company, a joint venture between Harbin Aviation, MCIC Holdings (Malaysian) & Mitsubishi Motors which has an output of about 65 PS (48 kW). Transmission is a 5-speed manual type, and an automatic is being explored.

It has a high level of equipment, including dual airbags, door intrusion bars, MP3 CD tuner & 6 speakers, 60:40 folding rear seats and height-adjustable ELR seatbelts.

Several distributors/dealers have been appointed in Malta, Cyprus, United Kingdom, Pakistan and Nepal. Exports have commenced.

On 17 December 2007, Naza Corporation released the Naza Forza which is an updated version of the original Sutera with up to 600 changes to the original car. Externally the new car is differentiated by the new front headlamps, new tail lamps and re-designed rear bumper. While there are also improvements made to the interior, key changes have been made under the bonnet to improve on the Sutera's refinement.

== Sales ==
Year	Malaysia (Note: Figures based on registration)
2006	6,110
2007	2,786
2008	651
2009	15
2010	3
2011	5
