= Geely LC =

City car

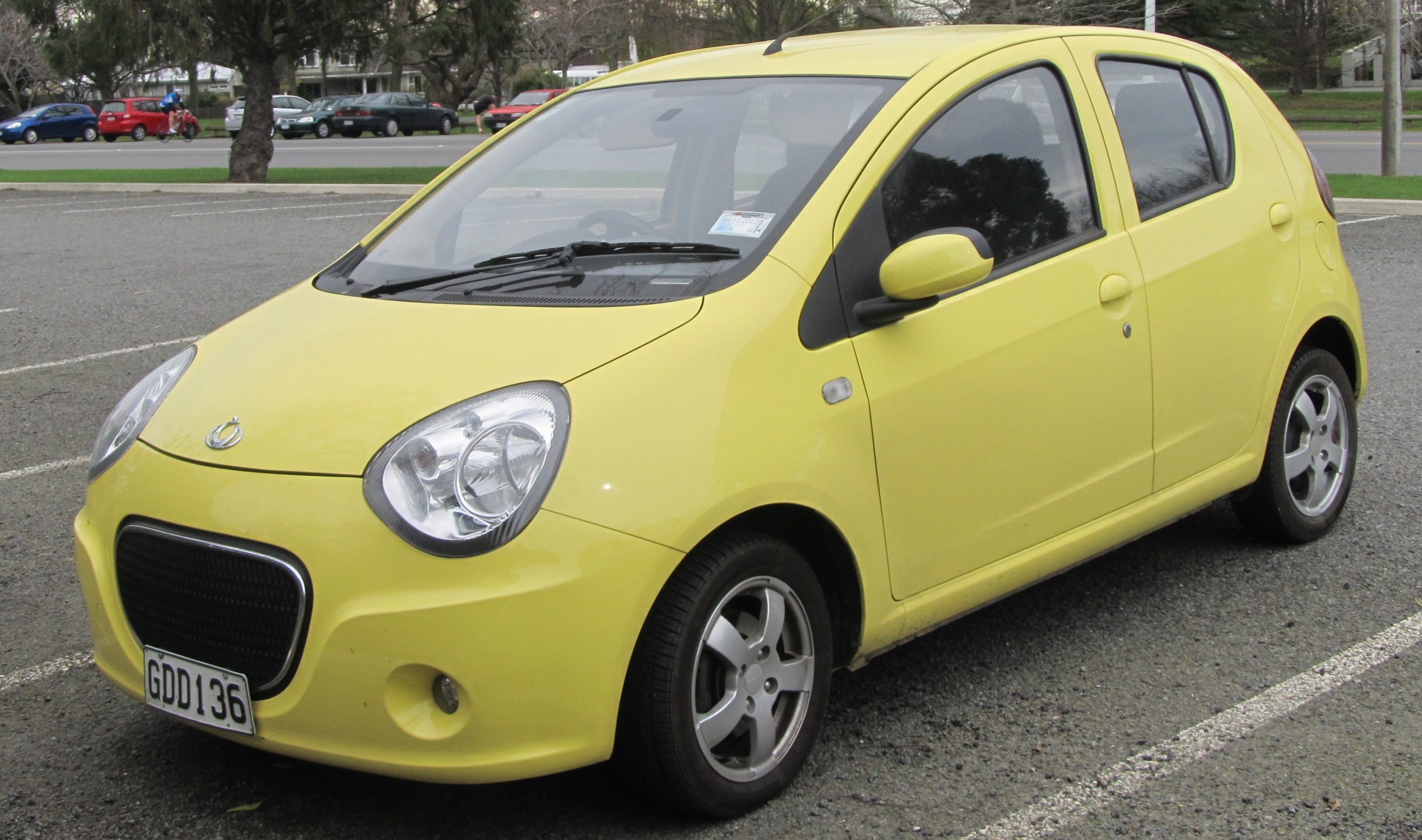
- 2011 Geely LC (New Zealand)

Overview
- Manufacturer: Geely Auto
- Also called: Gleagle Panda; Geely Panda; Gleagle GX2; Geely-Gleagle Panda; Tobe M'Car (Taiwan); Tobe W'Car (Taiwan); Yulu EV2; Kandi Panda EV; Micro Panda (Sri Lanka); Geely GC2 (Brazil and Uruguay)
- Production: 2008–2016
- Assembly: China: Ningbo, Zhejiang; Taiwan: Miaoli (Yulon)

Body and chassis
- Class: City car
- Body style: 5-door hatchback
- Related: Tobe M'car

Powertrain
- Engine: 1.0 L JL3G10A I3 (petrol); 1.3 L MR479Q I4 (petrol); 1.5 L MR479A I4 (petrol)
- Electric motor: 15–30 kW (20.4–40.8 PS; 20.1–40.2 hp) induction motor
- Transmission: 5-speed manual 4-speed automatic
- Battery: 22 kWh Lithium-iron phosphate (LiFePO4)

Dimensions
- Wheelbase: 2,340 mm (92.1 in)
- Length: 3,598 mm (141.7 in)
- Width: 1,630 mm (64.2 in)
- Height: 1,465 mm (57.7 in)
- Curb weight: 937–985 kg (2,066–2,172 lb)

Chronology
- Successor: Geely Yuanjing X1 (Geely Panda), Geely Panda Mini EV

The Geely LC, sold in its home market as the Geely Panda or the Gleagle Panda, is a city car produced by the Chinese manufacturer Geely Auto from November 2008 to 2016. In 2010 the LC scored 45.3 in C-NCAP crash tests, making it China's first locally researched and developed compact car to be awarded a 5-star rating, and it is subsequently the safest Chinese hatchback as of 2011. The LC was able to achieve the above despite a development process that relied more on computer simulations than actual crash tests. In 2017, the Panda was replaced by a facelifted version of the car known as the Geely Yuanjing X1.

== Online sale ==
As of 22 December 2010, popular Chinese e-commerce retailer Taobao Mall sells the LC online although buyers must put down a 288 yuan deposit and visit a local dealership for a test drive before purchase. The LCs on offer are not delivered to your door.

First day online sales totalled near 500.

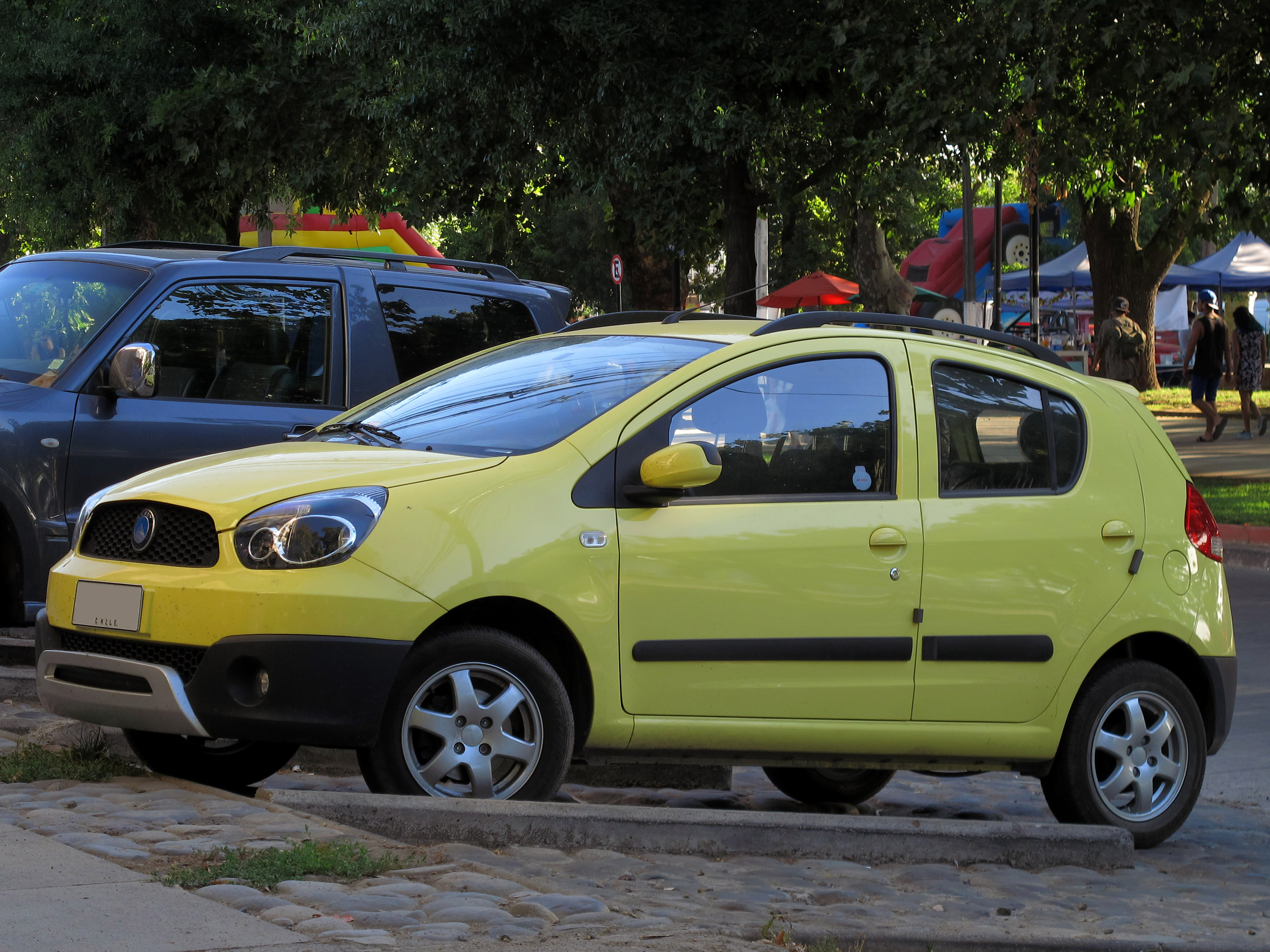
Geely LC Cross

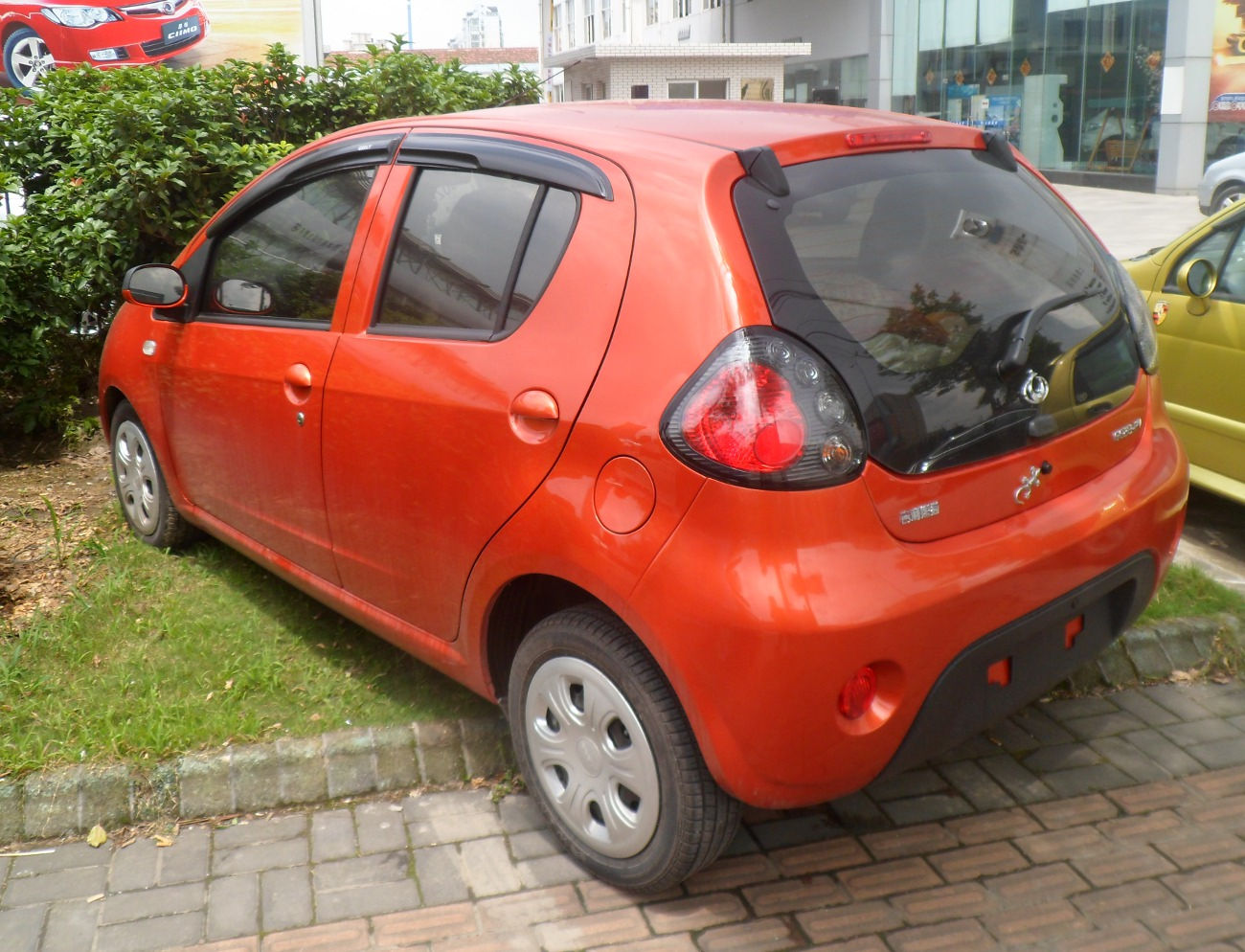
The Gleagle Panda's panda-paw tail-lamps can be clearly seen in this view

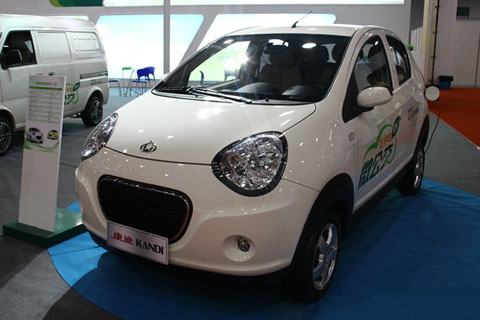
Geely-Kandi Panda EV charging at an autoshow

== Styling ==
The LC's styling has been recognized for its exceptional exterior, which manufacturer Geely says is "bionic" and resembles a panda but that some criticize for resembling the Toyota Aygo, instead. Geely outsourced the design of the LC's exterior to another Chinese firm, CH-Auto.

== Geely LC 1.5 ==
Engine specifications – 1.5L

Specification	Description
Cylinders	4
Displacement	1,498 cm3
Power	70 kW (95 PS; 94 hp) at 5,500 rpm
Torque	128 N⋅m (13.1 kg⋅m; 94.4 lb⋅ft) at 3,400 rpm
Fuel	Petrol
Top speed	180 km/h (112 mph)
Tyre size	165/60 R14

== Overseas sale ==
While the car is sold in overseas markets, its name and the brand name under which it is sold may change.

=== Brunei ===
The LC was only sold in Brunei since 2013 (1 year sold), only with a 5-speed manual transmission and 4 colours available.

=== Indonesia ===
The LC is sold in Indonesia as a Geely Panda.

=== New Zealand ===
The LC is sold in New Zealand as a Geely LC Hatch.

=== Sri Lanka ===
A local company, Micro Cars, offers the LC in Sri Lanka. It is domestically assembled from complete knock down kits.

=== Egypt ===
Under the name Geely Pandino, the LC is sold in Egypt.

=== Taiwan ===
A rebadged, redesigned LC called the Tobe M'Car is sold in Taiwan by Yulon Motors, which may also assemble it. The M'car uses the same body and interior as the LC but features improved performance and locally designed components.

The vehicle also provides the basis when the Dongfeng Yulon joint launched their new energy vehicle brand Yulu (裕路) in China. The Yulu EV2 electric city car is largely based on the Tobe M'Car, which is a rebadged Geely Panda, with only the front and rear ends being redesigned.

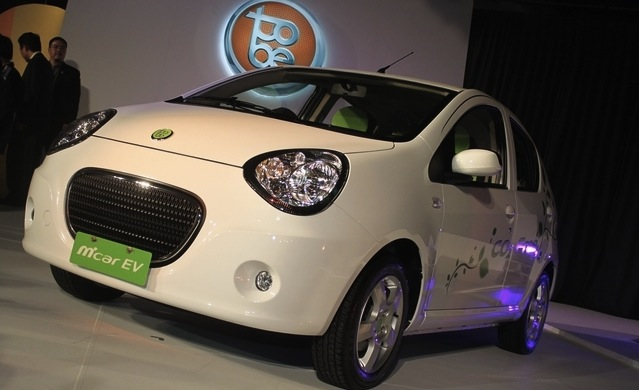
Tobe M'Car EV front view

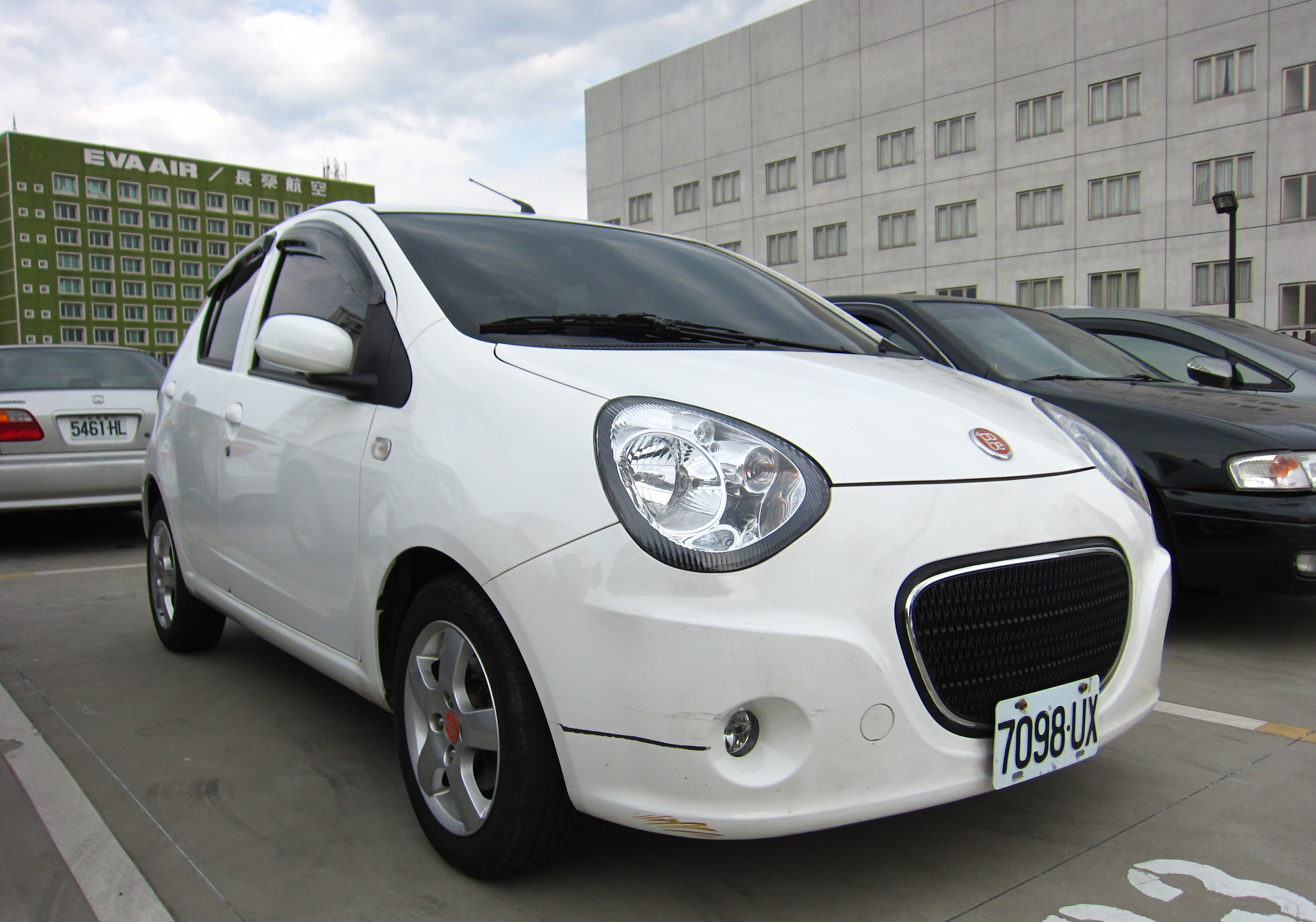
Tobe M'Car front view

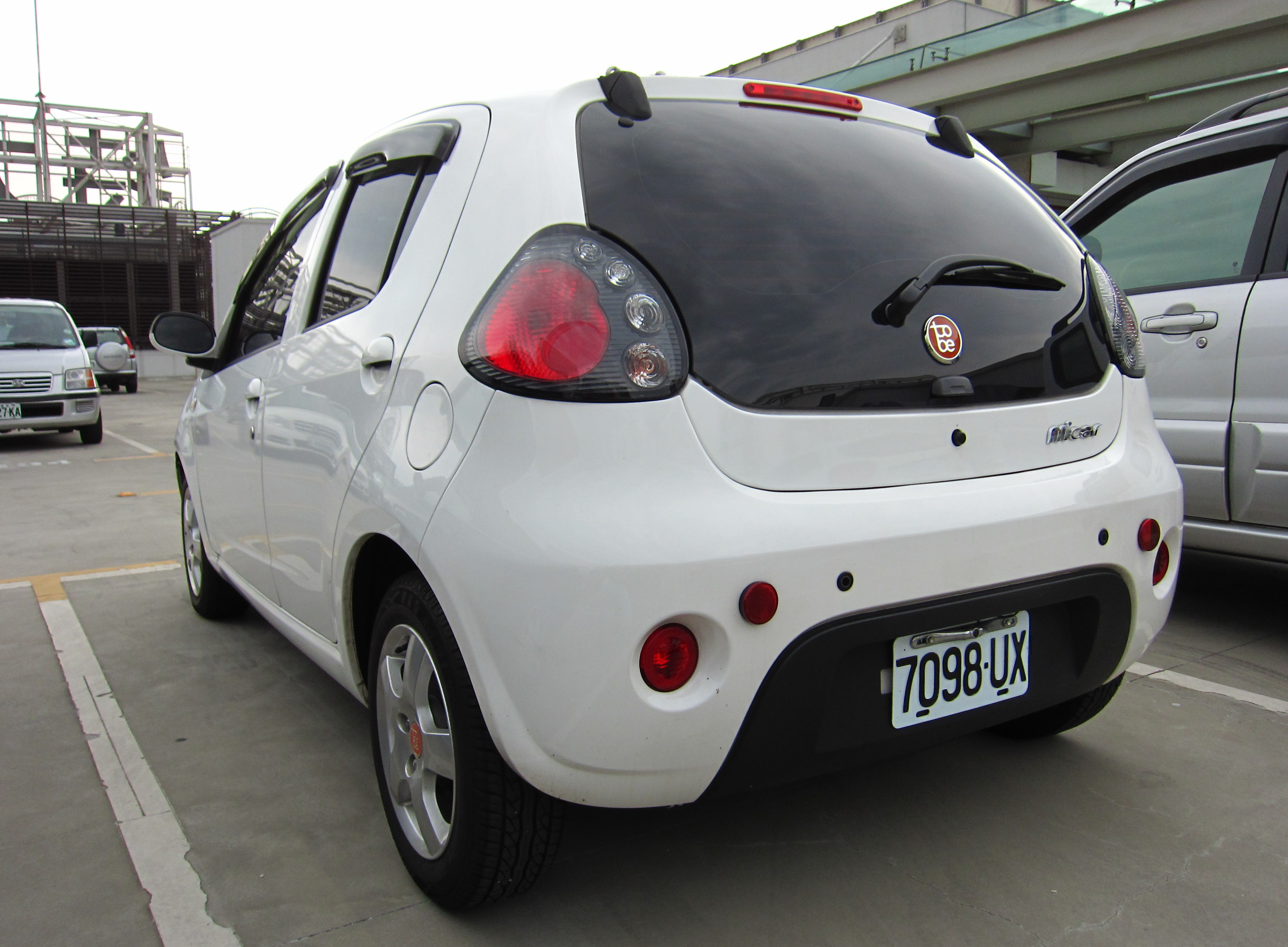
Tobe M'Car rear

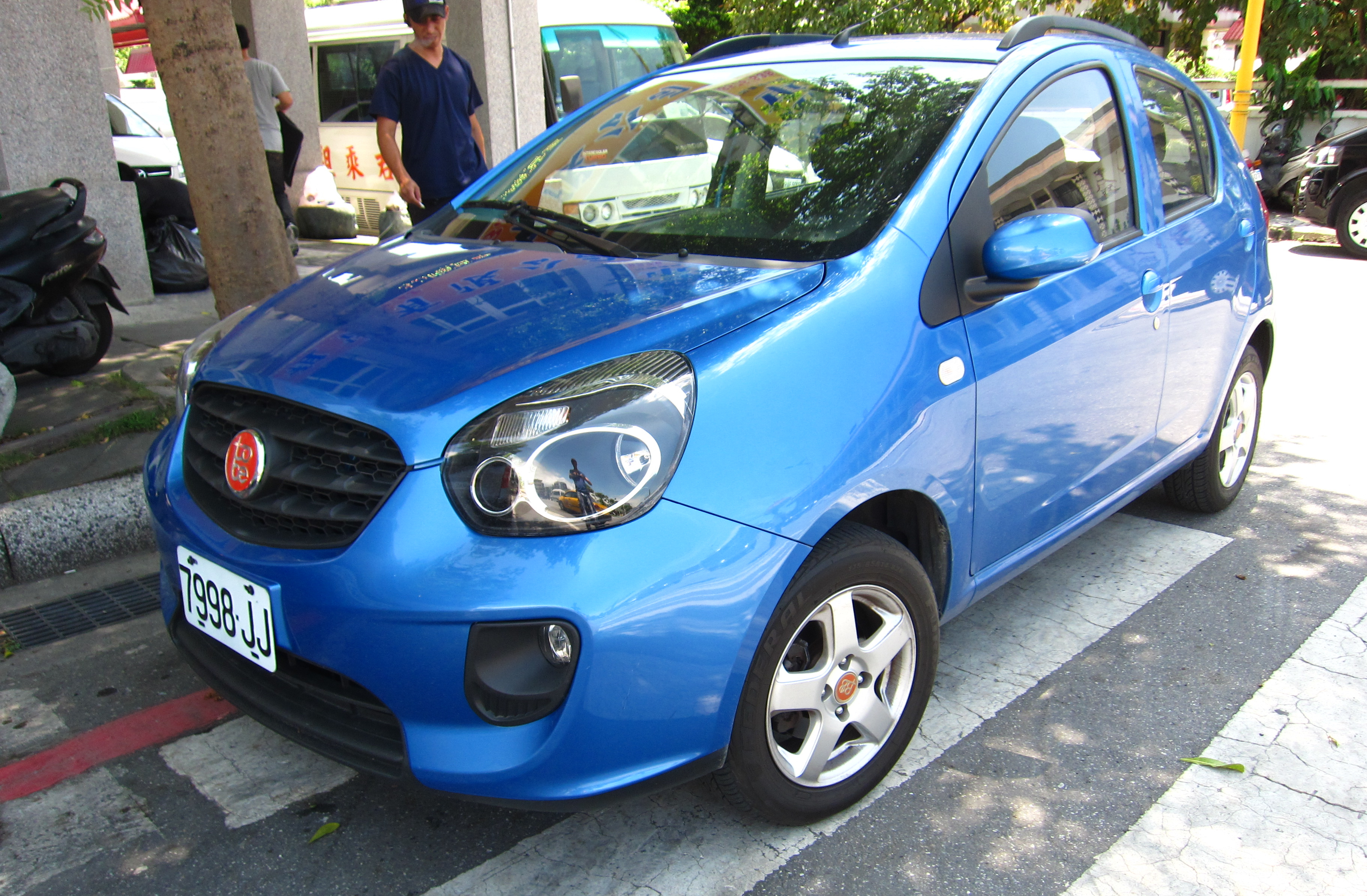
Tobe W'Car front view

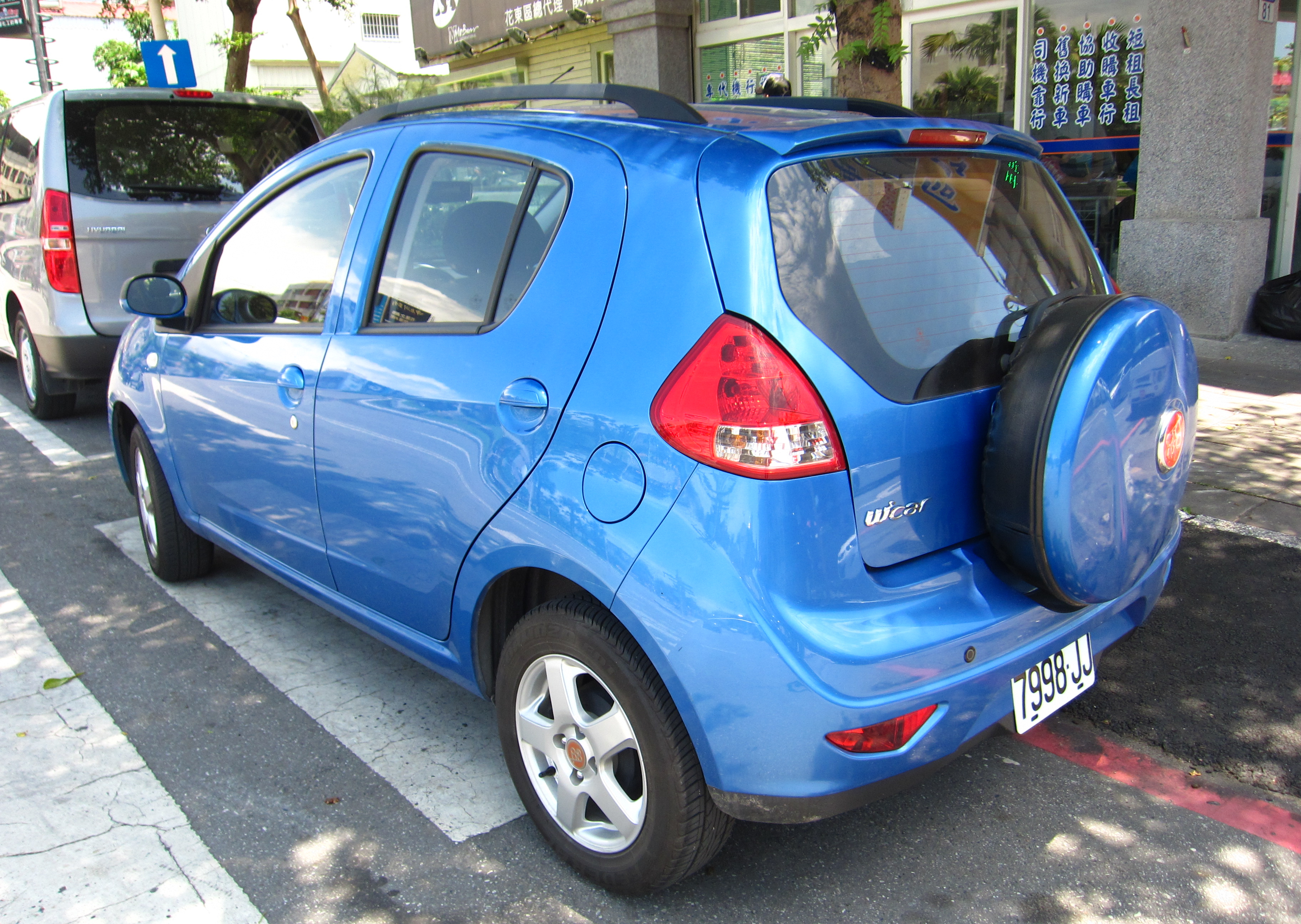
Tobe W'Car rear

=== Cuba ===
In Cuba, the LC is commonly used as a rental vehicle but also sold to private owners as a Geely Panda.

=== Argentina ===
The LC was sold in Argentina from 2016 to 2018.

== Yulu EV2 ==
The Yulu (裕路) EV2 is an electric microcar based on the rebadged and restyled body of the Geely LC. The Yulu EV2 was launched on October 18, 2017, and is the result of the Yulon-Geely tie-up in Taiwan. The Yulu EV2 is closely related to the Tobe-M'car and was produced by Dongfeng Yulon exclusively for the Mainland China market. The Yulu EV2 is equipped with a 21.9 kWh battery capable of delivering an NEDC range of 150 kilometres (93 miles). The Yulu EV2 has a maximum power output of 36 hp (36 PS; 27 kW) and 140 N⋅m (14.3 kg⋅m; 103 lb⋅ft) of torque. The top speed is 100 km/h (62 mph). Production ceased in 2018.

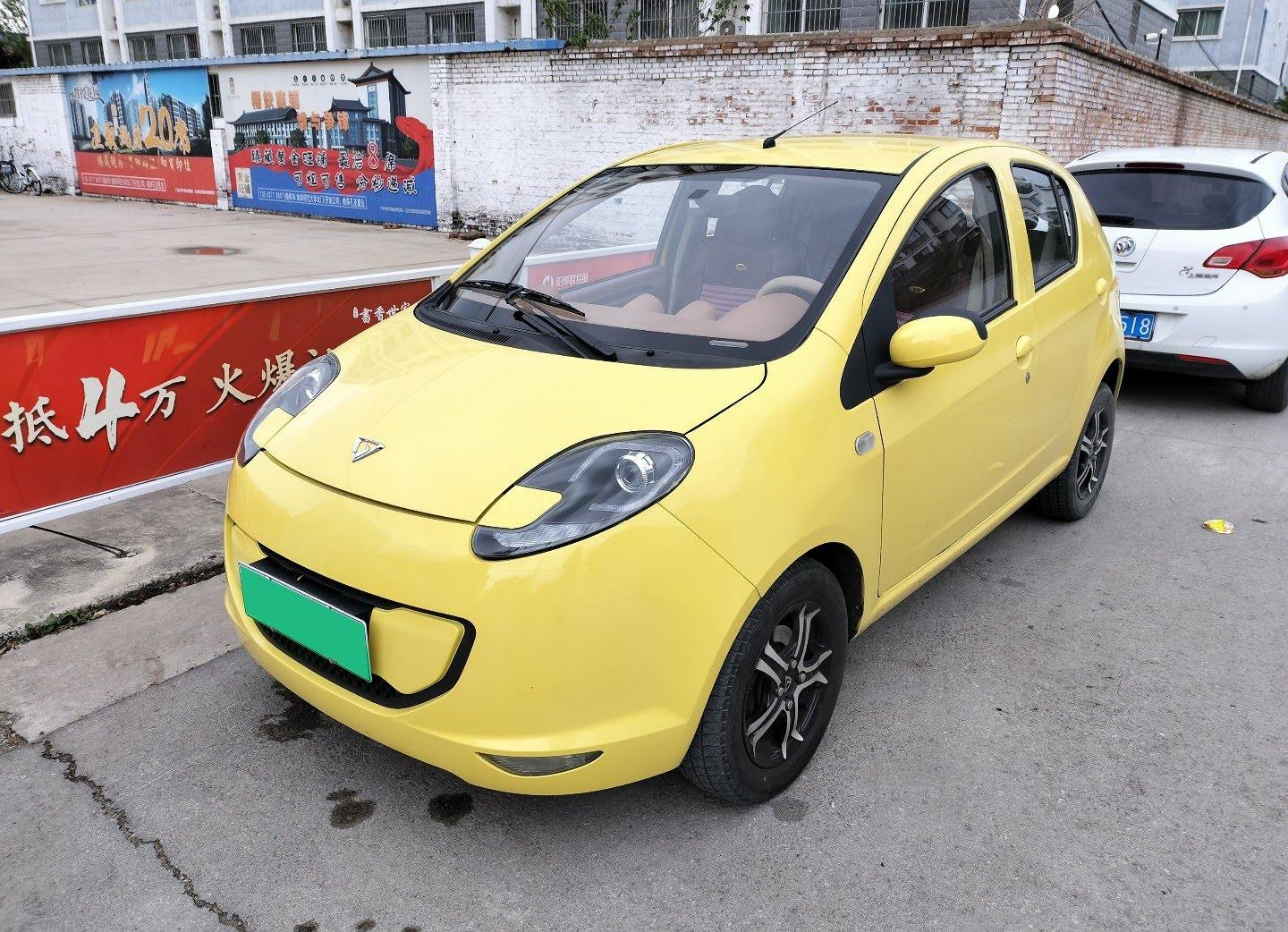
Yulu EV2 front view

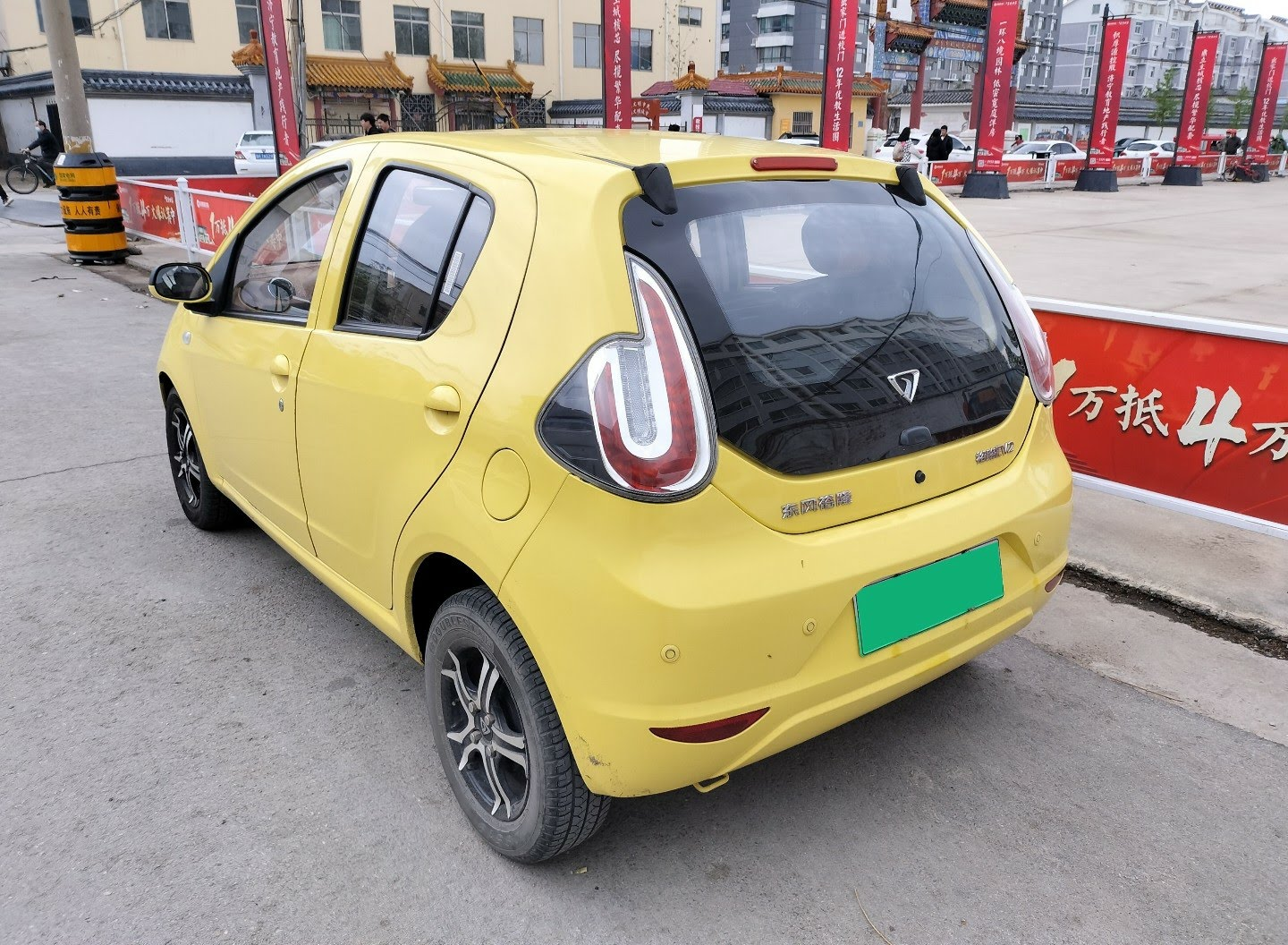
Yulu EV2 rear view
