= Micro Trend =

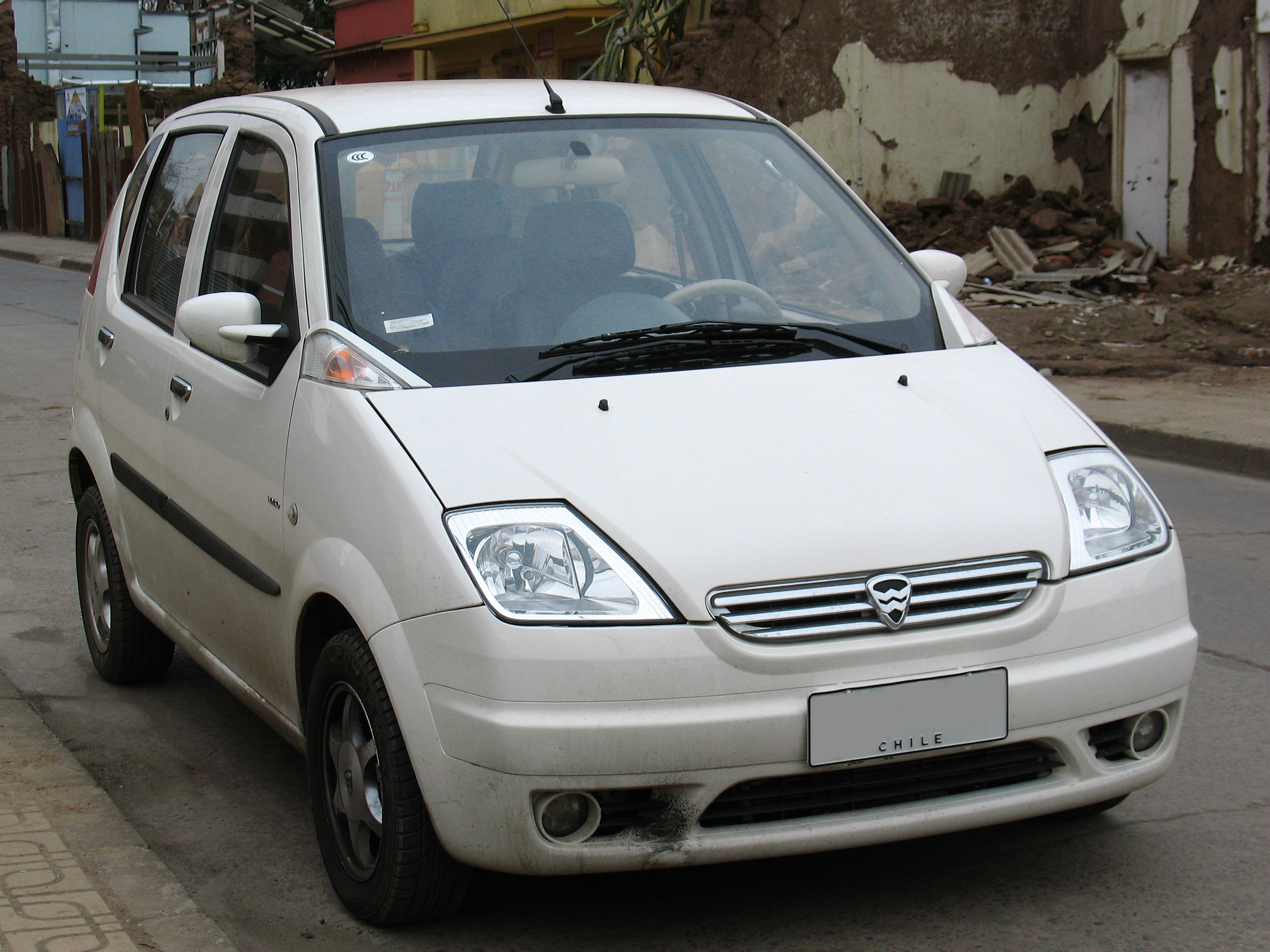

Overview
- Manufacturer: Micro Cars Ltd. Sri Lanka
- Also called: Hafei Lobo
- Production: 2003-present
- Model years: 2003-present
- Assembly: Kelaniya, Sri Lanka.
- Designer: Pininfarina

Body and chassis
- Class: City car
- Body style: 5-door hatchback
- Layout: FF layout
- Related: Naza Sutera

Powertrain
- Engine: 1.0 L I4 (petrol); 1.4 L I4 (petrol)
- Transmission: 5-speed manual 5-speed automated manual

The Micro Trend is a city car produced by Micro Cars Ltd. Sri Lanka. It was designed by the Italian company Pininfarina and the Chinese company Hafei Motors. It was first introduced in January 2003 and sales began by April 2003.

== Overview ==
Engine	In-line Twin cam 16 valves, 4-cylinder (1075cc/1375cc) Multi-point fuel injection (MPFI) Petrol engine.
Transmission	5 speed manual transmission, Front wheel drive (Optional) 5 speed Automatic transmission (AMT)
Suspension	Front: Independent MacPherson strut Rear: Trailing arm with coil spring
Steering	Rack & Pinion with power assist steering.
Brakes	Servo (Power assist), front-Discs, Rear-Drum Optional ABS (Anti-lock Braking System) with Electronic Brake-force distribution.
Dimensions (mm)	3618 (L) x 1563 (W) x 1533 (H)
Fuel Tank	40 Liters extended to 60 Liters
Curb Weight	895 kg
Body/Seating	5 door (Hatch Back) / 5 adults
Safety	Monococque steel body; Energy-absorbing collapsible steering column; Side Intrusion beam; Optional SRS Air bags.; Optional ABS with Electronic Break-force distribution.
Interior	Beige in colour with Walnut finishing; Center placed cup holder; Lockable lower dash glove compartments
Head up display	Tachometer (Rev. Counter); Speedometer; Trip Meter; Temperature & Fuel level gauges; Standard vehicle system check indicators
Features	Air conditioning with Economy mode; Digital Radio/CD player; Central Locking; Front Power windows; Rear defroster; Rear window wiper with washer; Front bumper fog lamps and rear bumper fog lamps; Full crystal lights (Front/Rear)
Optional Features	13" Alloy wheels; Anti-lock braking system (ABS); SRS Airbag
Warranty	Two years or 40,000 km, which ever occurs first
