= Geely Panda Mini EV =

Battery electric city car

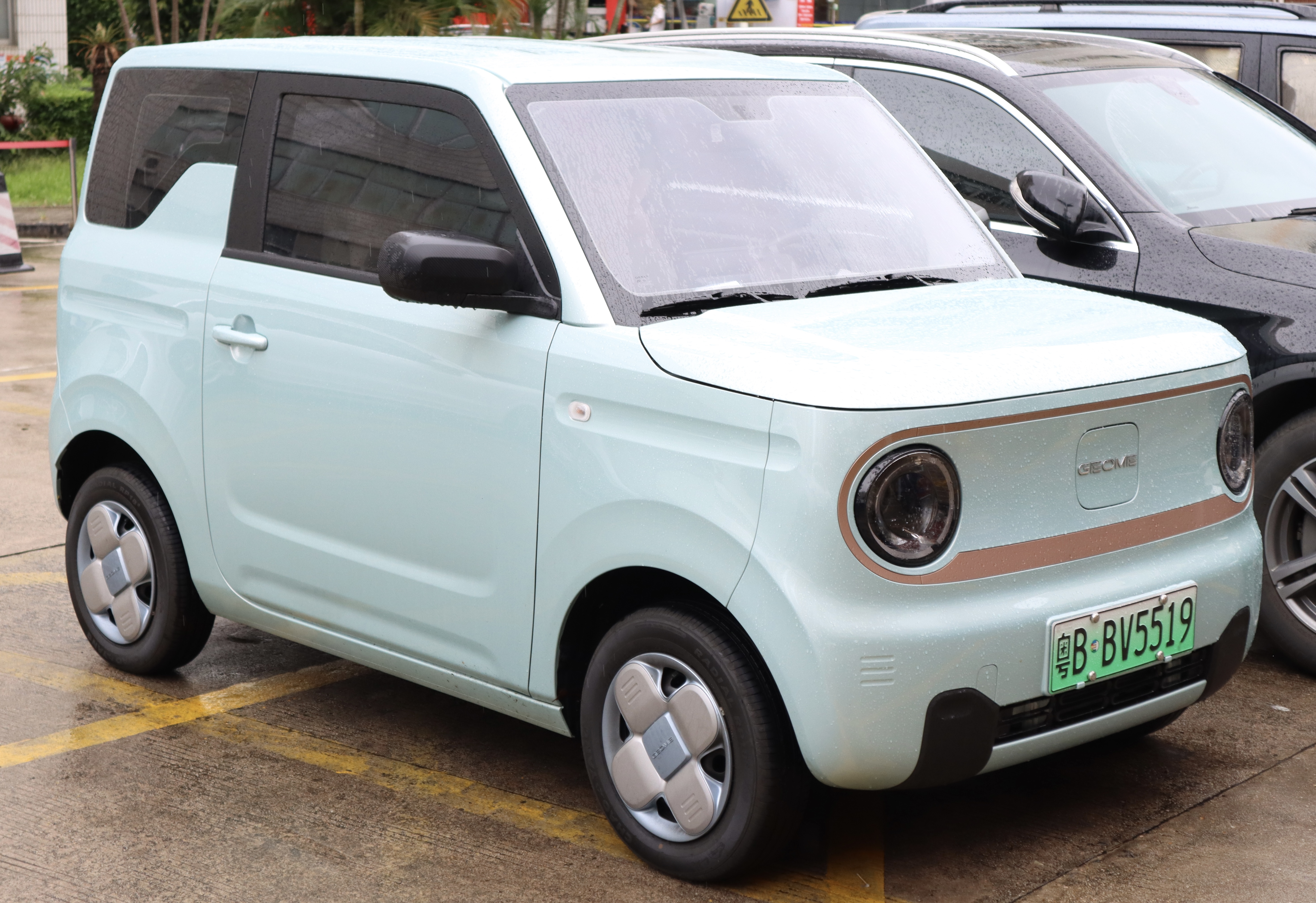
- 2022 Geometry Panda Mini EV

Overview
- Manufacturer: Geely
- Also called: Geometry Panda Mini EV; Geometry M2; Livan Blue Balloon (Smurf)
- Production: 2022–present
- Assembly: China

Body and chassis
- Class: City car
- Body style: 3-door hatchback
- Layout: Rear-motor, rear-wheel-drive

Powertrain
- Electric motor: TZ160X30C permanent magnet synchronous
- Power output: 20–30 kW (27–40 hp; 27–41 PS)
- Transmission: Single-speed gear reduction
- Battery: 9.61 kWh LFP; 17 kWh LFP Gotion
- Electric range: 120–210 km (75–130 mi) (CLTC)
- Plug-in charging: DC: 22 kW

Dimensions
- Wheelbase: 2,015 mm (79.3 in)
- Length: 3,065 mm (120.7 in); 3,100 mm (122.0 in) (Livan Blue Balloon)
- Width: 1,522 mm (59.9 in); 1,558 mm (61.3 in) (Livan Blue Balloon)
- Height: 1,600 mm (63.0 in); 1,610 mm (63.4 in) (Livan Blue Balloon)
- Curb weight: 715–815 kg (1,576–1,797 lb)

Chronology
- Predecessor: Geely Panda

The Geely Panda Mini EV (Chinese: 吉利熊貓MINI EV; pinyin: Jílì Xióngmāo MINI EV) is a battery electric city car that has been manufactured by Geely Auto since 2022. It was sold under the Geometry marque, but badged as "Geome" instead. It made its official debut at a shopping mall in the city of Hangzhou in December 2022.

== Overview ==
Spotted in a series of photos from China's Ministry of Industry and Information Technology, the Panda has a square shape, similar to the Wuling Hongguang Mini EV. It sports a pair of simple circular headlights while it lacks a front grille.

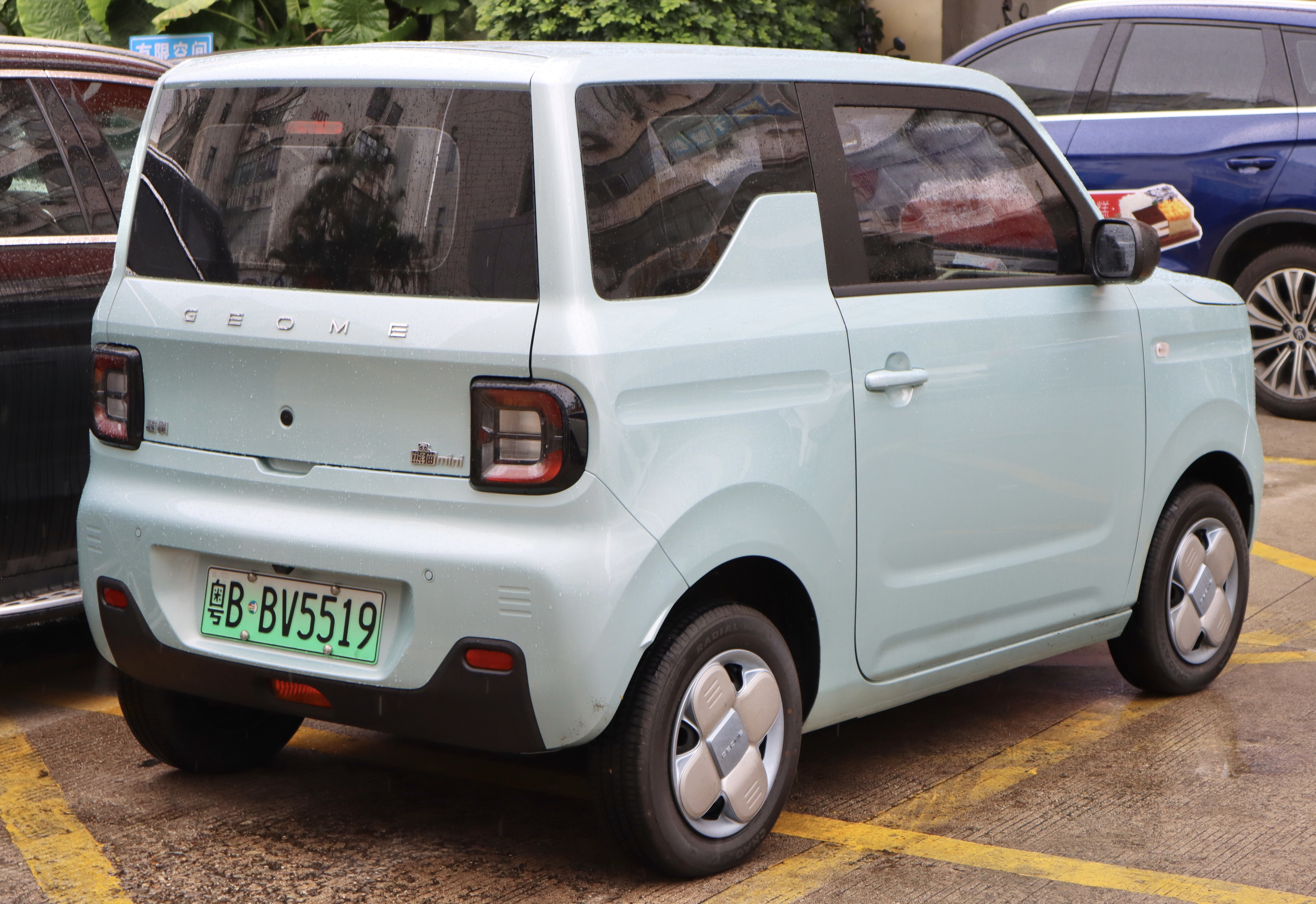
Rear view

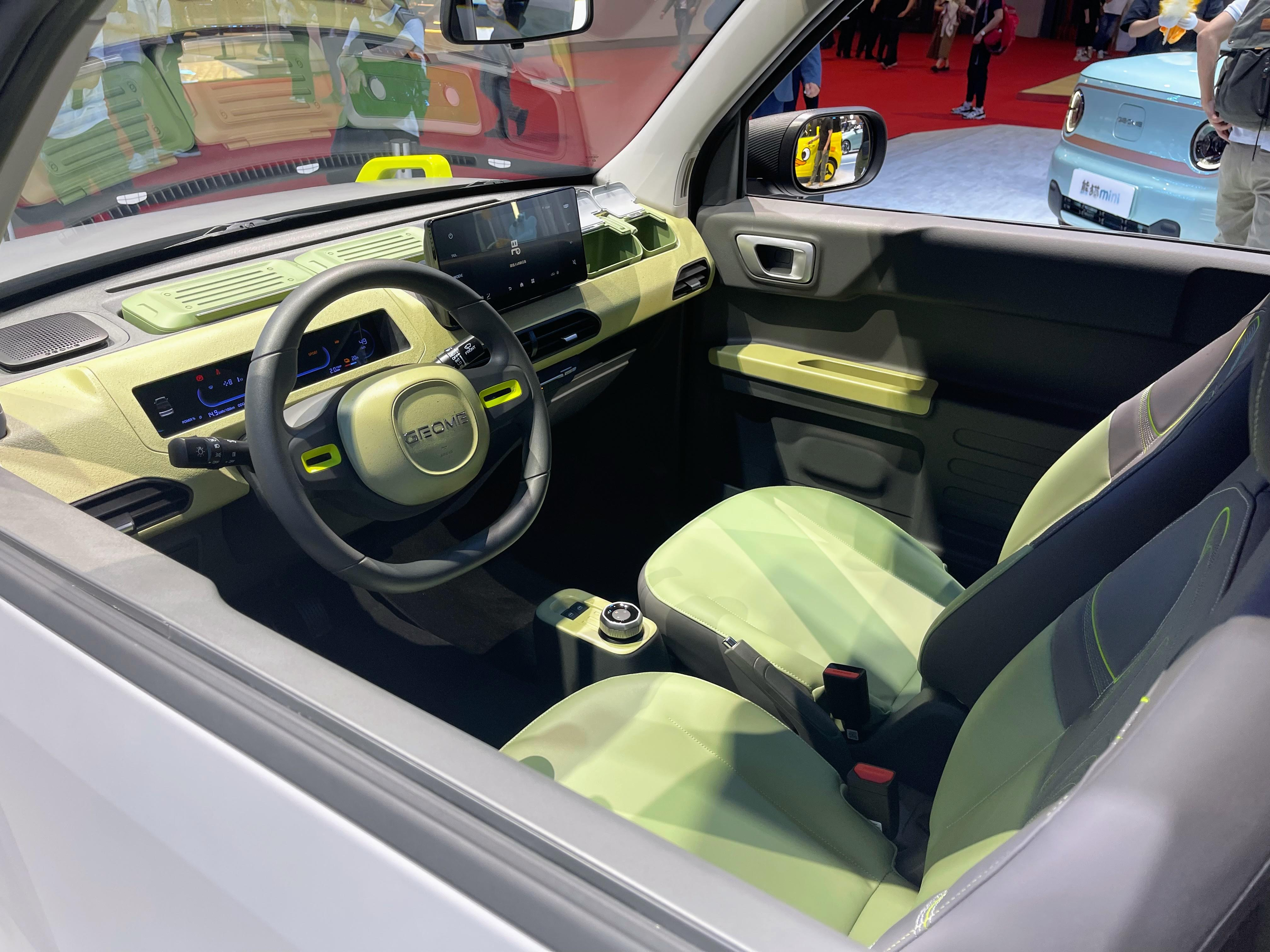
Interior

=== 2025 facelift ===
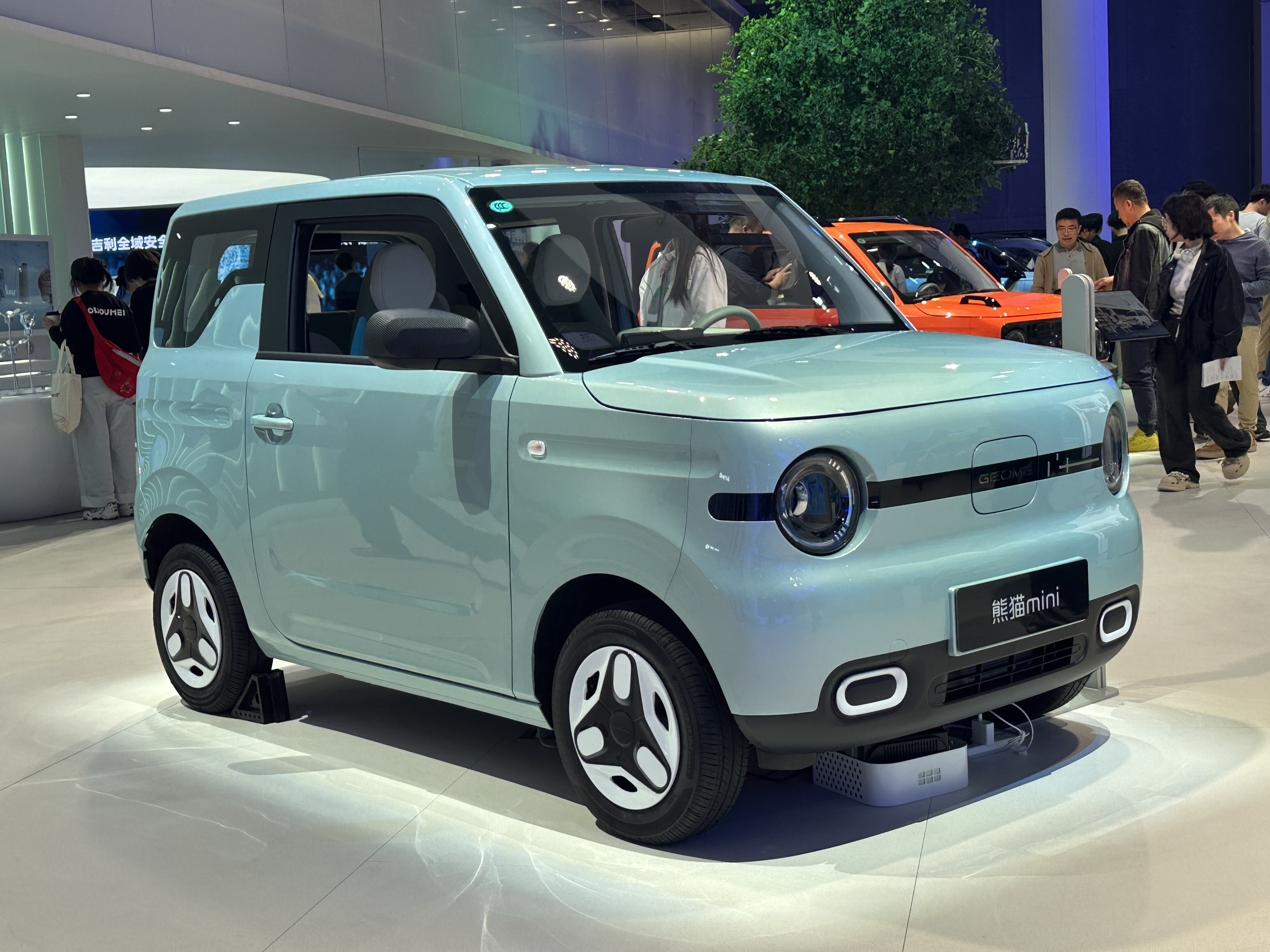
Geely Panda Mini EV 2025 (facelift)

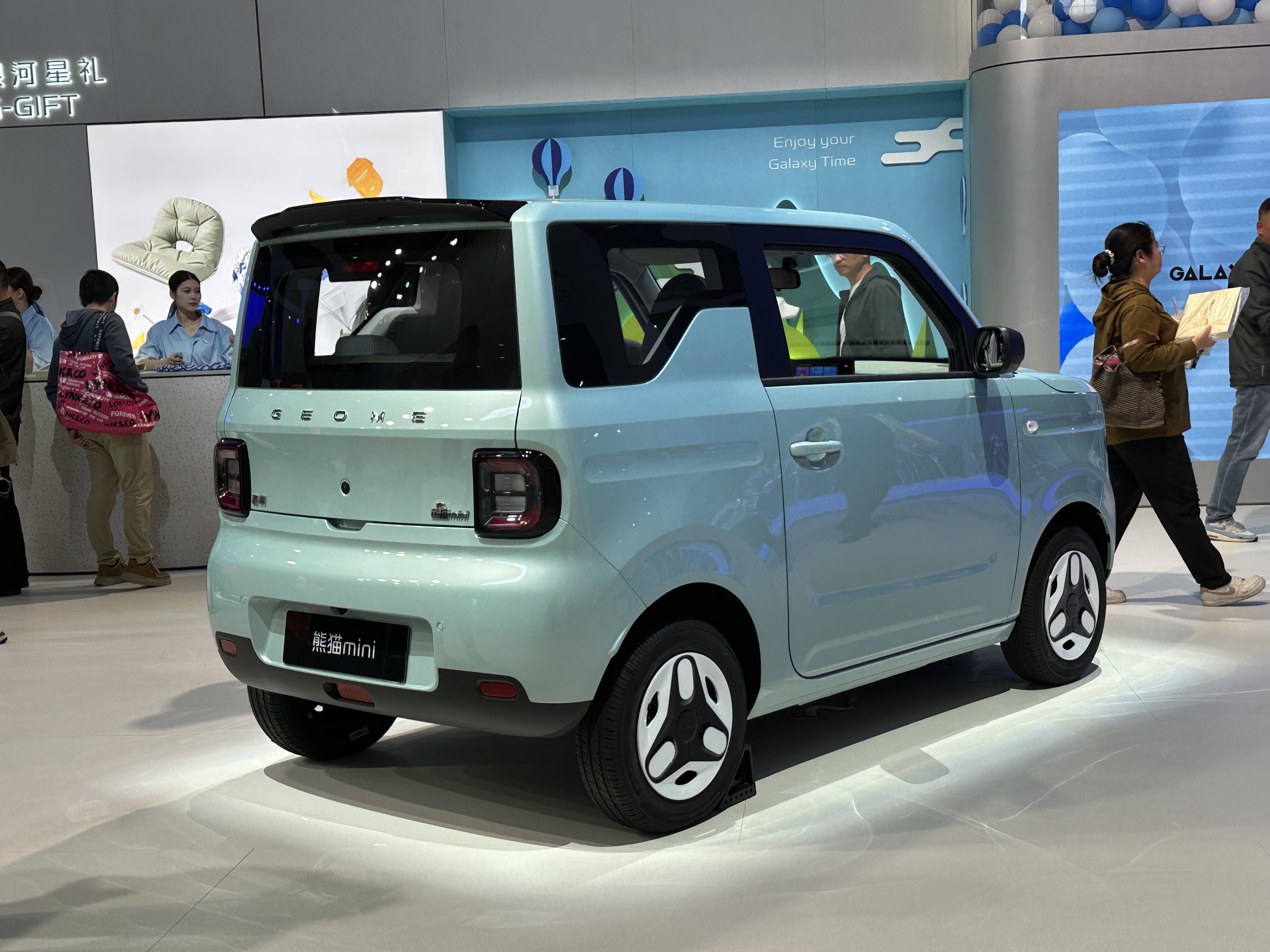
Rear view

== Livan Blue Balloon ==
The Livan Blue Balloon (Chinese: 睿蓝蓝气球) was presented in August 2025. It launched in China on 13 September 2025.

== Specifications ==
The production version of the Panda Mini EV was launched in February 2023. The Panda Mini EV is equipped with lithium iron phosphate (LFP) batteries supplied by Gotion Hi-Tech. The short-range version of the Panda Mini EV has a CLTC range of 120 km (75 mi), while the long-range version has a CLTC range of 200 km (120 mi) with a maximum driving speed of 100 km/h (62 mph). The long-range version is fitted with a 30 kW (40 hp) front motor and supports 22 kW DC fast charging capable of charging the battery from 30% to 80% within 30 minutes.

== Sales ==
Year	China	
Year	Panda Mini	Livan Smurf
2023	109,640	—
2024	131,599	—
2025	156,078	1,401
