= Geely Yuanjing X1 =

Mini crossover SUV

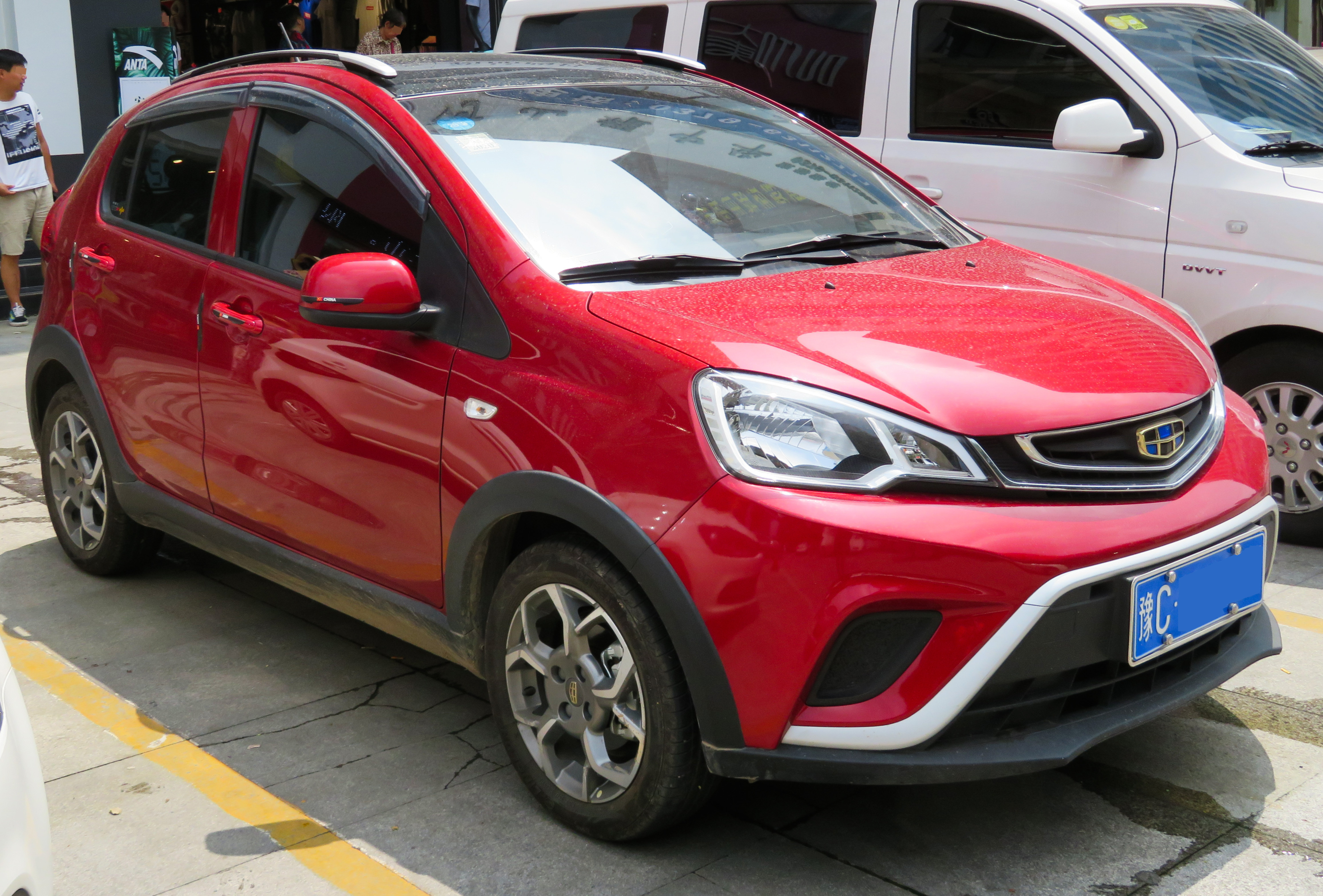

Overview
- Manufacturer: Geely Auto
- Model code: V01
- Production: 2017–2021
- Designer: Brett Patterson; Chun Ye; Xiaowen Li; Huanhuan Wang

Body and chassis
- Class: Mini CUV
- Body style: 5-door hatchback
- Layout: Front-engine, front-wheel-drive
- Related: Geely Panda

Powertrain
- Engine: 1.0 L I4 (gasoline); 1.3 L I4 (gasoline)
- Transmission: 5-speed manual; 4-speed automatic

Dimensions
- Wheelbase: 2,353 mm (92.6 in)
- Length: 3,778 mm (148.7 in)
- Width: 1,663 mm (65.5 in)
- Height: 1,519 mm (59.8 in)

Chronology
- Predecessor: Geely Panda/GX2

The Geely Yuanjing X1 is a mini CUV produced by the Chinese manufacturer Geely Auto, positioned below the Geely Yuanjing X3. In 2020, Geely discontinued the model.

== Background ==
As crossovers and SUVs gained popularity among Chinese consumers, many Chinese car manufacturers introduced SUV models to the market. Leveraging its expertise in car manufacturing, Geely launched seven new crossovers and SUVs—Vision SUV, Vision X1, Vision X3, Boyue, Vision S1, Emgrand GS, and the Emgrand GSe.

The Vision X1 helped Geely segment its market more precisely, completing the "Vision" family alongside the "Bo" and "Emgrand" families. Together, these three families advanced Geely's strategy of being "Young" and "Comprehensive".

== History ==
The Geely Vision X1, previously known as the Emgrand V01, was introduced in early 2017. The Geely Yuanjing X1 was officially launched in the Chinese market in May 2017, with prices ranging from 39,900 yuan to 57,900 yuan. The Yuanjing X1 is built on the platform of the Geely Panda, which was sold between 2009 and 2017.

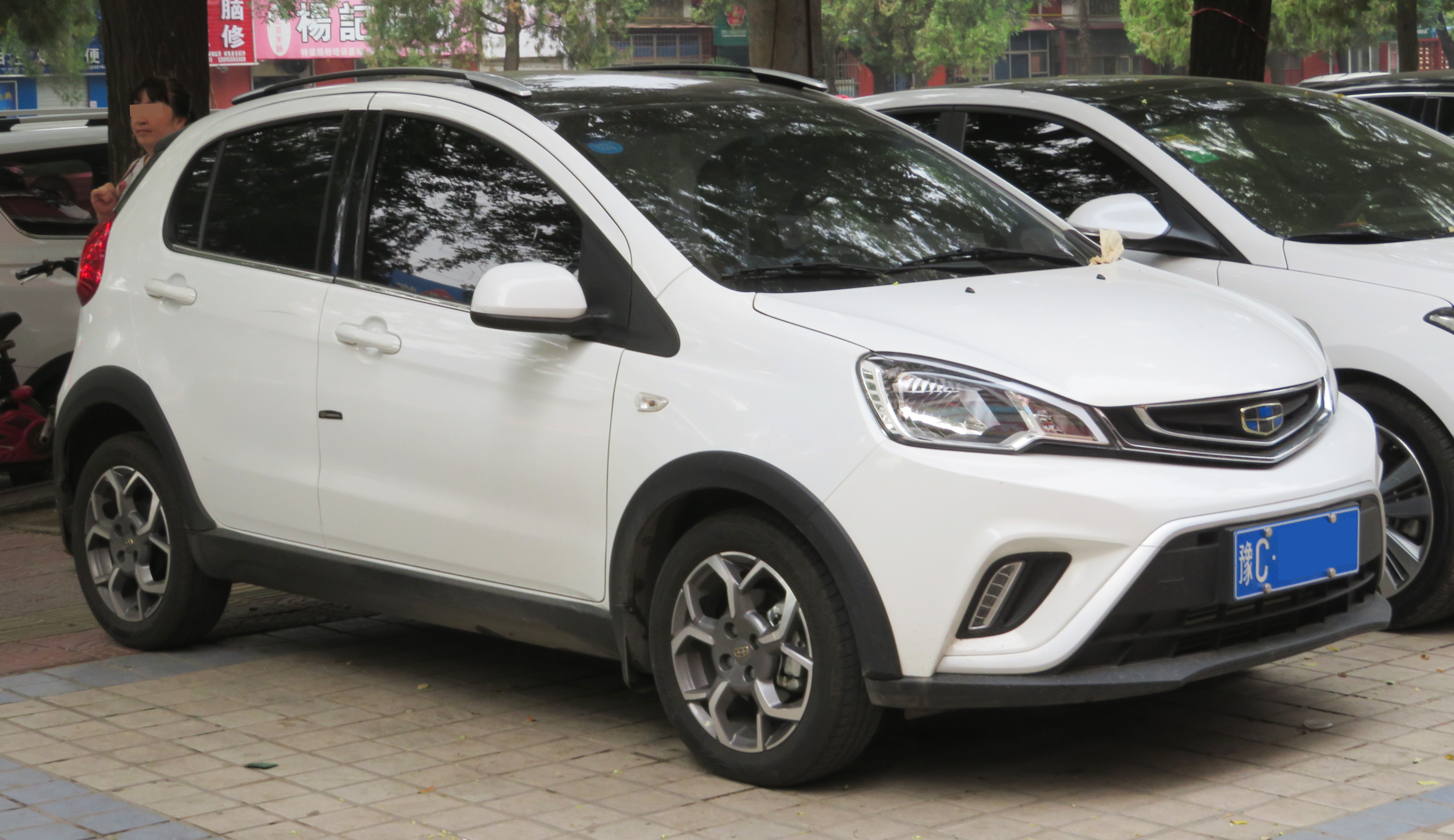
Geely Yuanjing X1 Front

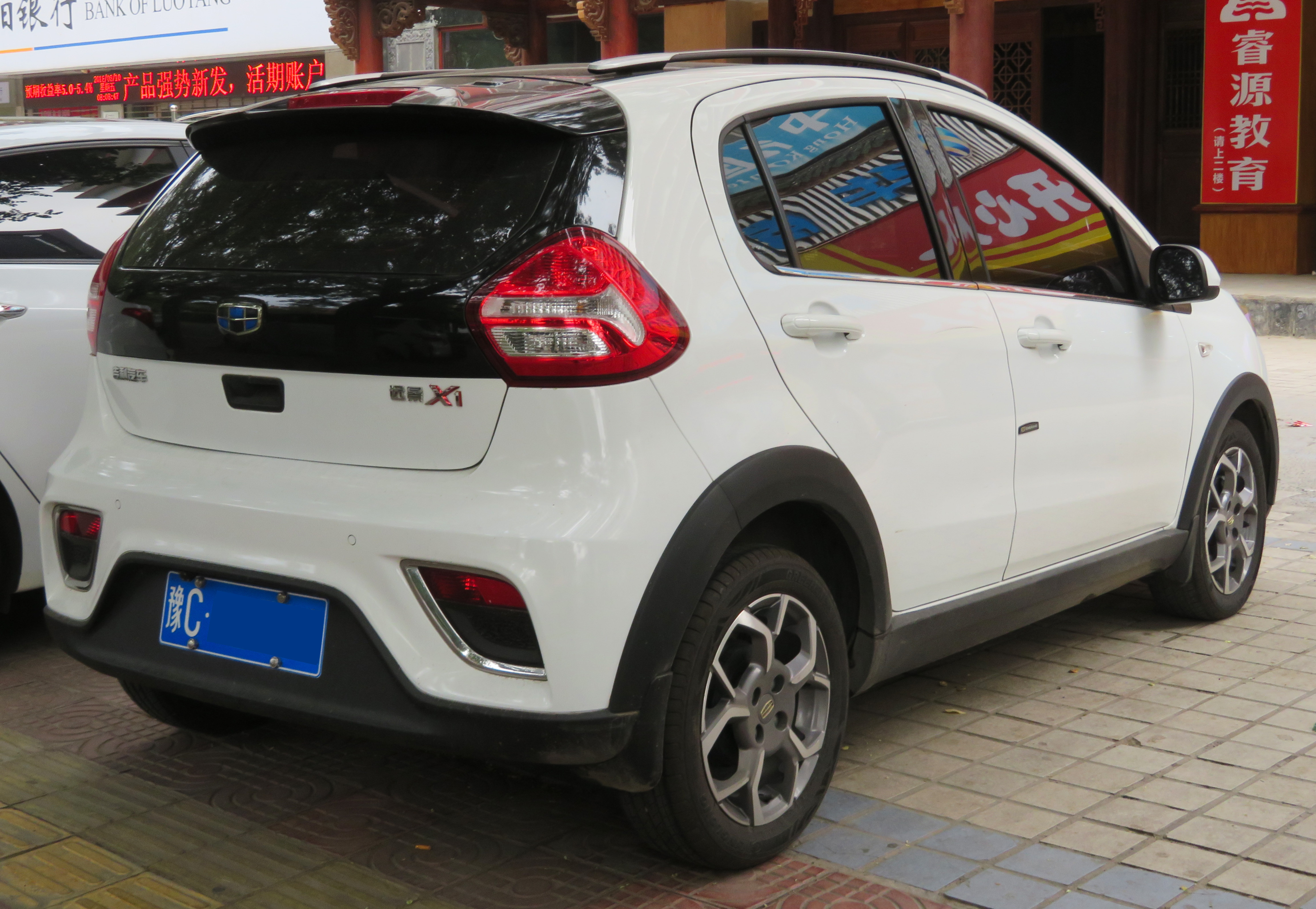
Geely Yuanjing X1 Rear

== Design ==
The Vision X1 continues the supermini CUV design of the Geely GX2, appealing to the post-90s generation. The interior has a more stylish look, with a dashboard inspired by surfboards. Its 11.6-inch touchscreen features Geely's X-FUN system, supporting voice control, GPS, and Wi-Fi. To activate the system, the user must say "你好远景" (Hello, Vision). The multifunction steering wheel enables the activation of ACC mode, switching of driving modes, and handling of Bluetooth calls. The panoramic sunroof is a unique feature, as no other supermini CUV offers one; however, the sunroof is non-opening. The Vision X1 is equipped with LingLong Green-Max 175/60 R15 tires. The front axle features disc brakes, while the rear axle has drum brakes.
