= Hafei Baili =

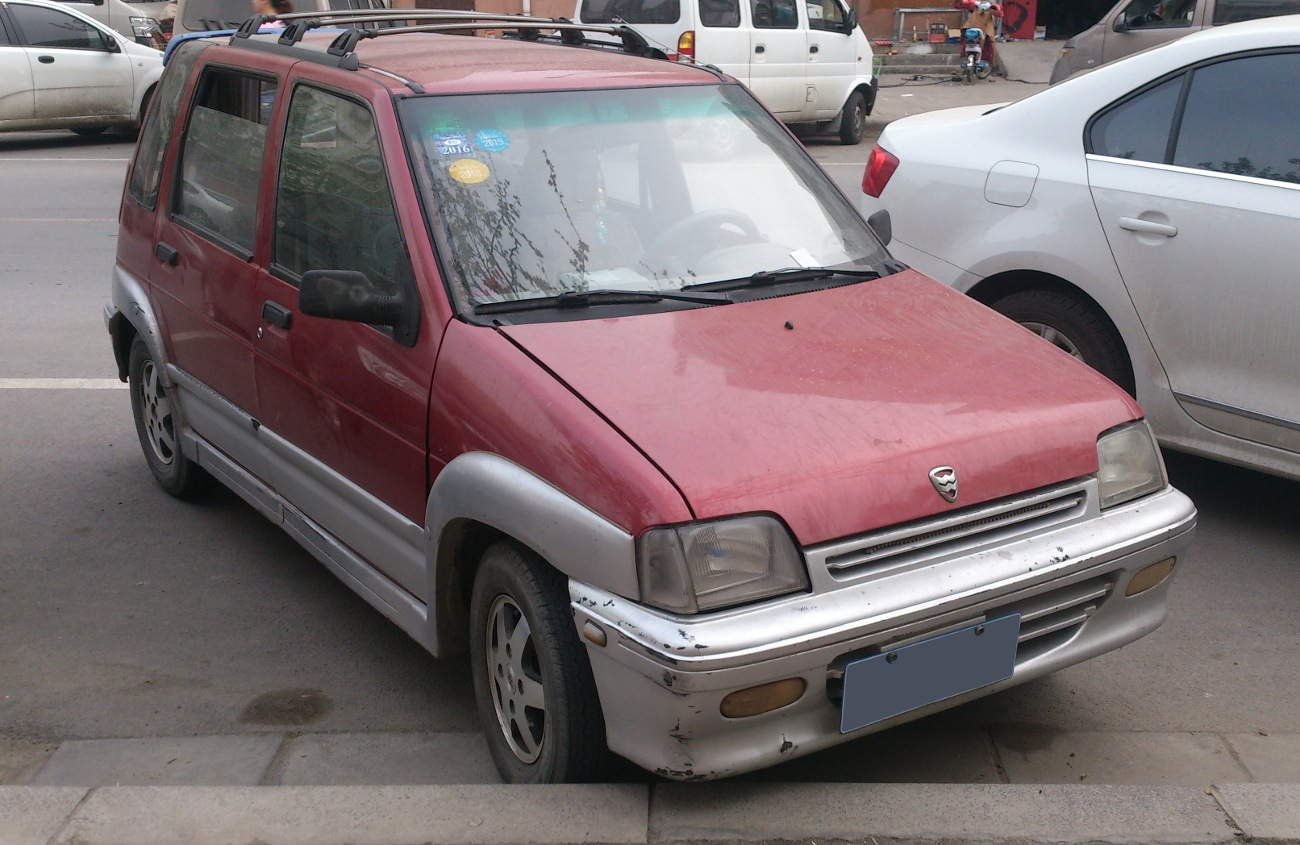

Overview
- Manufacturer: Hafei; Anhui Anchi
- Also called: HFJ7090; Anchi Baili
- Production: 1997–2004
- Model years: 1997–2004
- Assembly: Pingfang, Harbin, People's Republic of China

Body and chassis
- Class: City car
- Body style: 5-door hatchback
- Layout: Front-engine, front-wheel-drive

Powertrain
- Engine: 0.9 L I3 (petrol)
- Transmission: 5-speed manual

Dimensions
- Wheelbase: 2,335 mm (91.9 in)
- Length: 3,390 mm (133.5 in)
- Width: 1,485 mm (58.5 in)
- Height: 1,395 mm (54.9 in)
- Kerb weight: 680 kg (1,499 lb)

Chronology
- Successor: Hafei Lobo

The Hafei Baili (百利) is a city car produced by Chinese automaker Hafei from 1997 to 2004.

== Overview ==
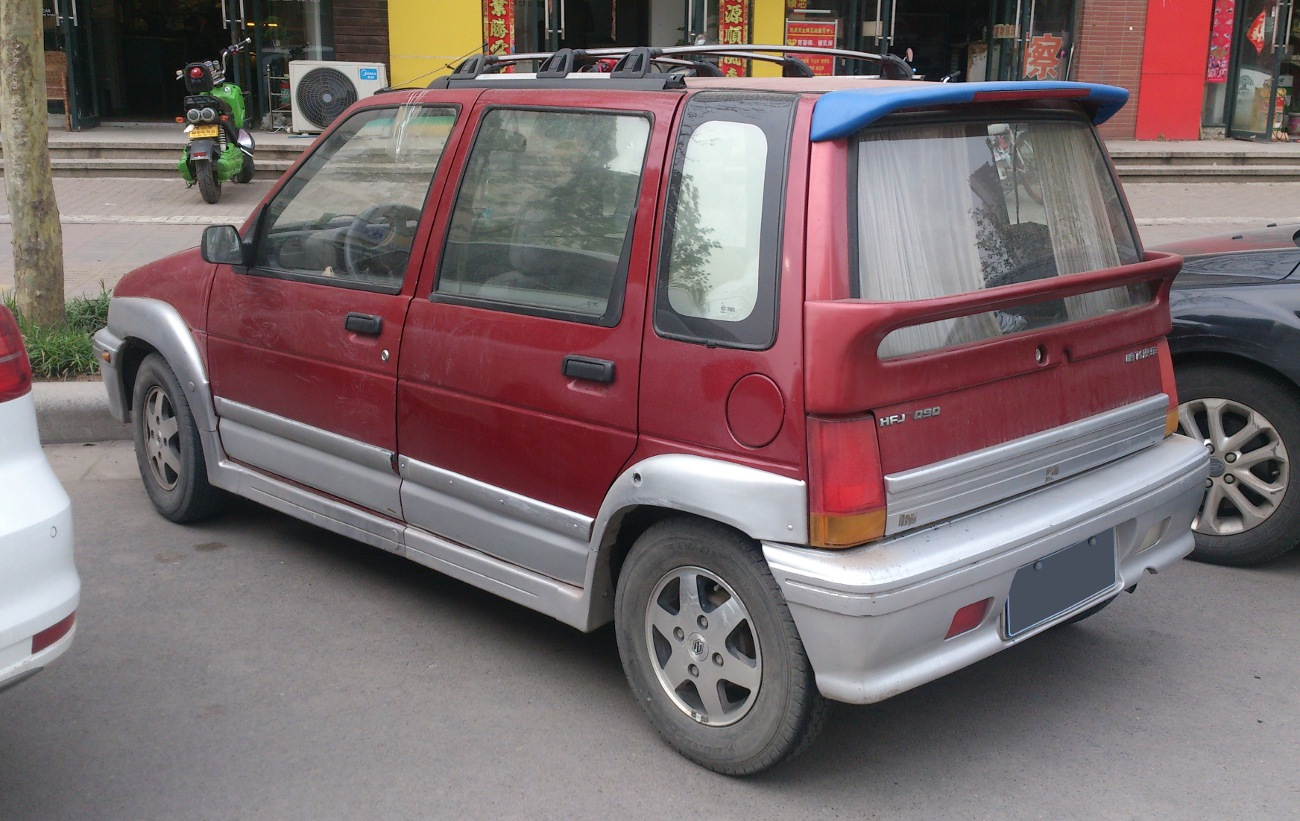
Hafei Baili rear quarter

The Hafei Baili was inspired largely from the Daewoo Tico. The car was equipped with an inline-three water-cooled 0.870 liter engine, producing 30kW and 64Nm of torque.

The Baili model was also made by a subsidiary of Hafei Motor, Anhui Anchi. The model produced by Anhui Anchi was essentially a rebadge and was called the Anchi Baili. The price of the Hafei Baili in 2004 starts from 30,800 yuan.
