= Micro Cars =

Automobile company

Micro Cars Ltd.
- Type: Public
- Industry: Automotive
- Founded: 1995; 31 years ago
- Headquarters: Kelaniya, Colombo, Sri Lanka
- Area served: Sri Lanka, South Asia
- Key people: Dr. Lawrence Perera (Founder and Chairman)
- Products: Automobile
- Website: www.microcars.lk

Micro Cars is an automobile company based in Peliyagoda, Sri Lanka, founded in 1995. It was established by automobile engineer, Dr. Lawrence Perera. Micro Cars is a fully owned subsidiary of Micro Holdings.

== History ==
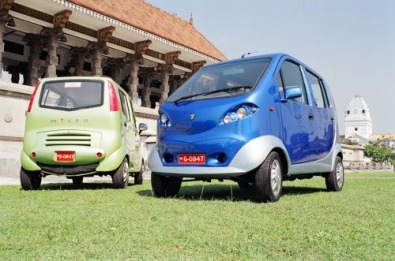
Mirco Privilege, first product of Micro Cars

Micro Cars was established by TAK engineer, Dr. Lawrence Perara. Micro's first introduction was "Micro Privilege" which had 1,000 cc (1.0 L; 61 cu in) gasoline engine with inline 4 cylinders. After that, it produced the Micro MPV Junior van and the Micro Trend hatchback, which were more advanced than the first introduction The "Micro" is designed, developed, and prototyped to be manufactured locally with at least 60% of local content. The prototype was prepared in 1999 with the running chassis making its debut run in December. The body was modelled in styling clay and then transferred to composite for final analysis in June 2000.

The first Micro was made in mid-2001. The Board of Investment provided state support for the car project. Its first car was legally registered only in 2003 after a lengthy battle with the motor car registration department of the country. Micro Cars export products to Nepal, Pakistan, and Bangladesh. Micro Cars, which is a fully owned subsidiary of Micro Holdings, is engaged in imports and assembly of the vehicle brands Geely, Hafei and Great Wall Motors of China.

== Products ==
=== Micro Panda/Panda Cross. ===
The Panda is assembled in Sri Lanka by Micro Cars from complete knock down kits. It is a small city car sold with a choice of 1.0 or 1.3 L (0.22 or 0.29 imp gal; 0.26 or 0.34 US gal) petrol engines. A 1.3 Cross version is also sold. Both come with 5 speed manual transmission and Micro Panda has a top speed of 150 km/h and Panda cross with 160 km/h. Micro Panda can generate 70 horsepower at 5500 rpm while Panda cross can generate 85 horsepower at 5500 rpm. The Chinese model Geely LC has a five-star safety rating from C-NCAP.

=== Micro MX7 Mark II ===
The MX7 Mark II is a rebadged version of the Geely MK (also known as King Kong), it is a traditional saloon car powered by a 1.5 L (0.33 imp gal; 0.40 US gal) petrol engine producing 93 horsepower at 6000 rpm. The car comes with 5-speed manual transmission, had a top speed of 165 km/h can accelerate from 0 – 100 km/h in 18 seconds.

=== Micro EC7 ===
The EC7 is a four-door saloon, powered by 1 1.8 L (0.40 imp gal; 0.48 US gal) petrol engine producing 139PS.

=== Micro Impreza ===
The Impreza is a fastback saloon powered by 2 2.0 L (0.44 imp gal; 0.53 US gal) petrol engine producing 148 hp.

=== Micro Duo Deck bus ===
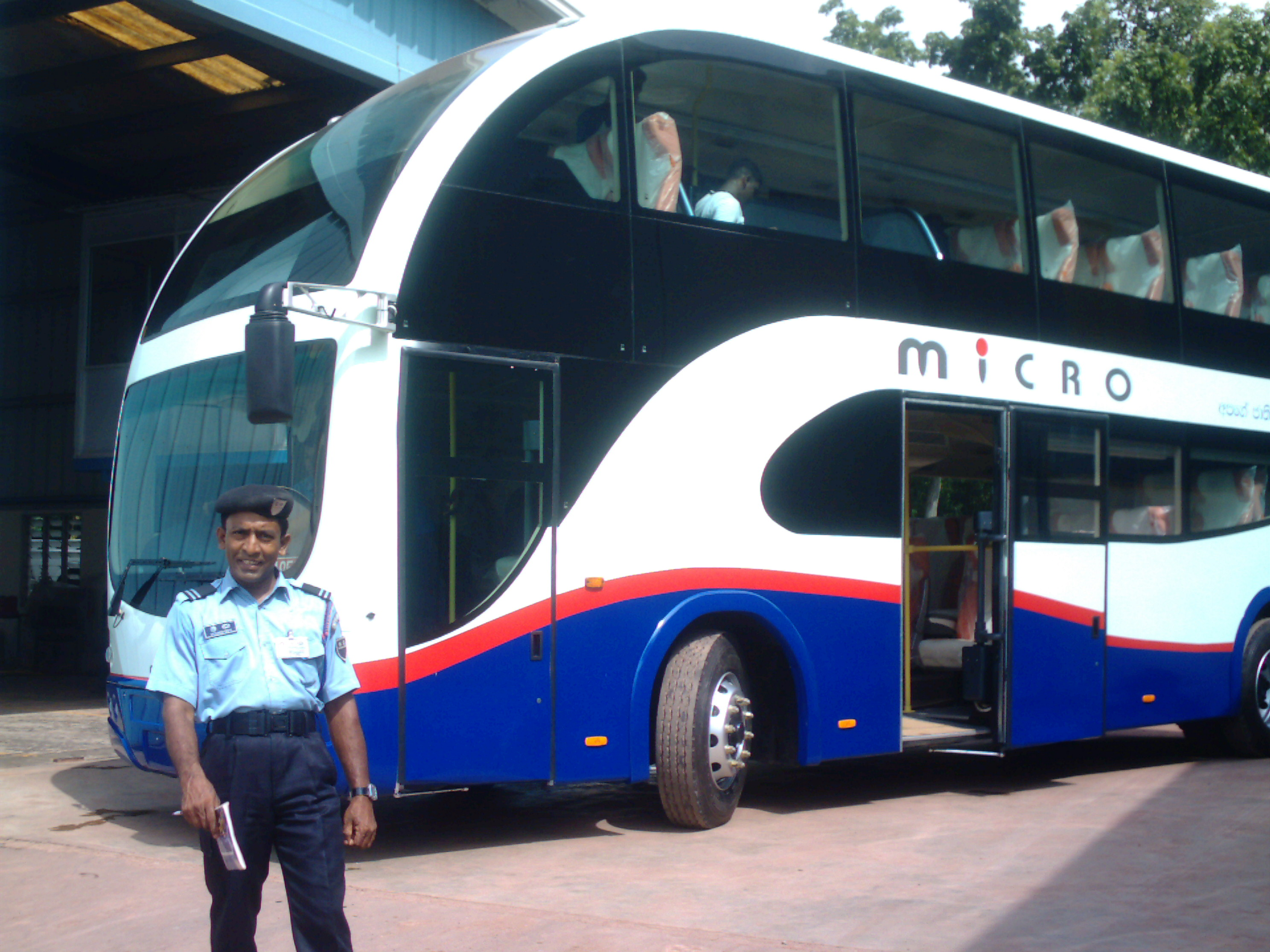

The Micro Duo Deck is a double-decker bus designed and manufactured by Micro Cars Ltd following a deal with Chinese suppliers in 2006. The bus features a low floor arrangement, ABS brakes, full air-conditioning and automatic doors. The bus has seating for 102 persons and 26 standing. The engine and chassis are imported with Chinese parts and assembled in Sri Lanka.

=== Discontinued models ===
Micro Privilege

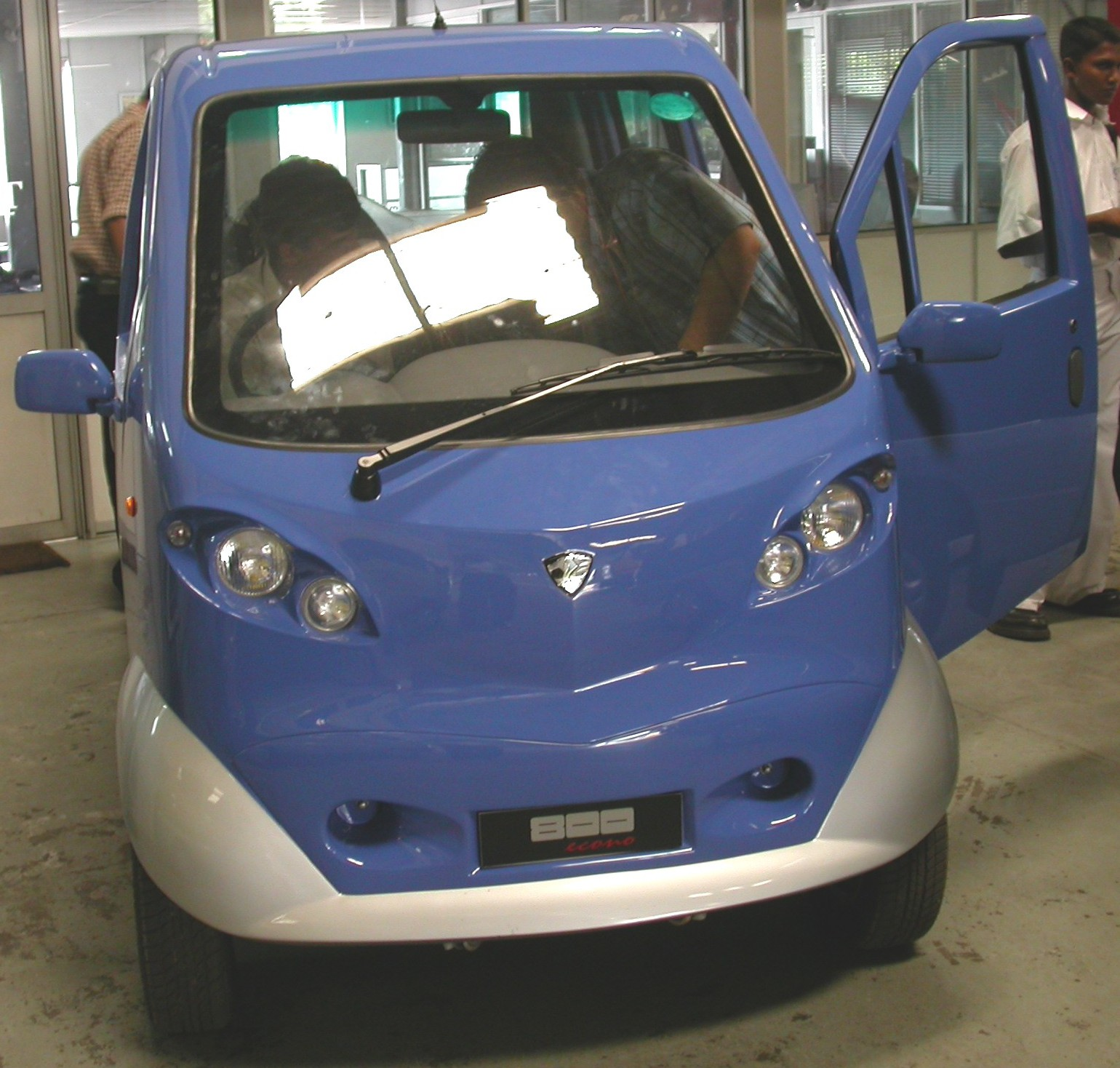

The Privilege was the first car produced by Micro. This car is powered by 1,000 cc (0.22 imp gal; 0.26 US gal) Inline 4-cylinder EFI gasoline engine. The transmission system is a 5-speed manual. It includes other common options which can be found in other normal cars, such as crystal head lamps, factory-fitted air conditioners, 13" wheel rim, radio CD/cassette player, electric windows, and remote central locking.

Micro Trend

The Micro Trend is a city car designed by Italy's Pininfarina and Hafei Motors. It was first introduced in January 2003 and sales began in April 2003. However, in 2010 they introduced a new version of the Micro Trend, with the first batch of New Trend cars on sale by early March 2011.

Micro MX7 Mark II

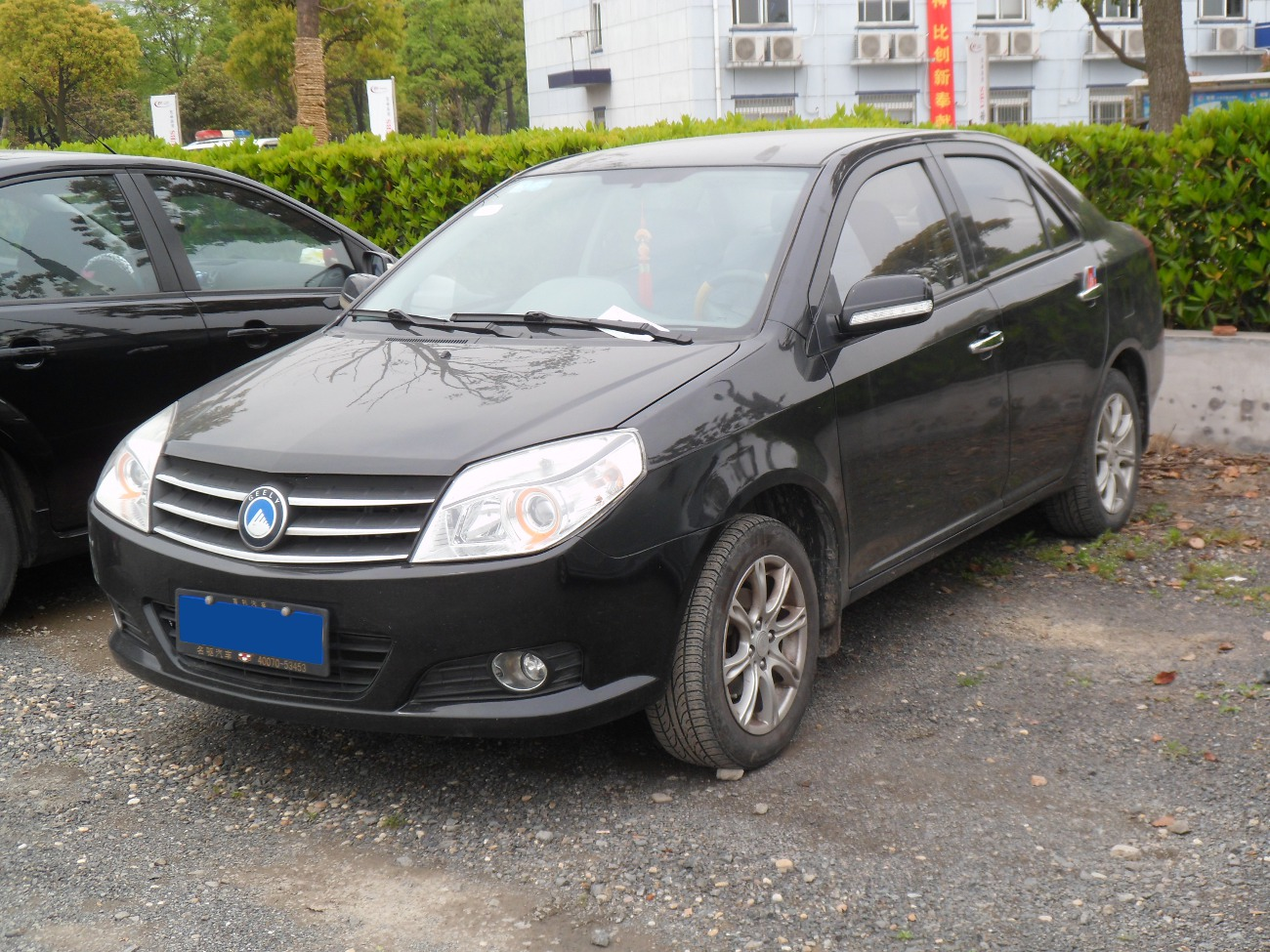
Micro MX7

The Micro MX7 is a traditional saloon car designed by Pininfarina and powered by a Mitsubishi 1.6 L (0.35 imp gal; 0.42 US gal) petrol engine producing 100 hp (75 kW).

Micro MPV

Micro MPV is the Company's first minivan made at the start of the company.
