= Hafei Zhongyi =

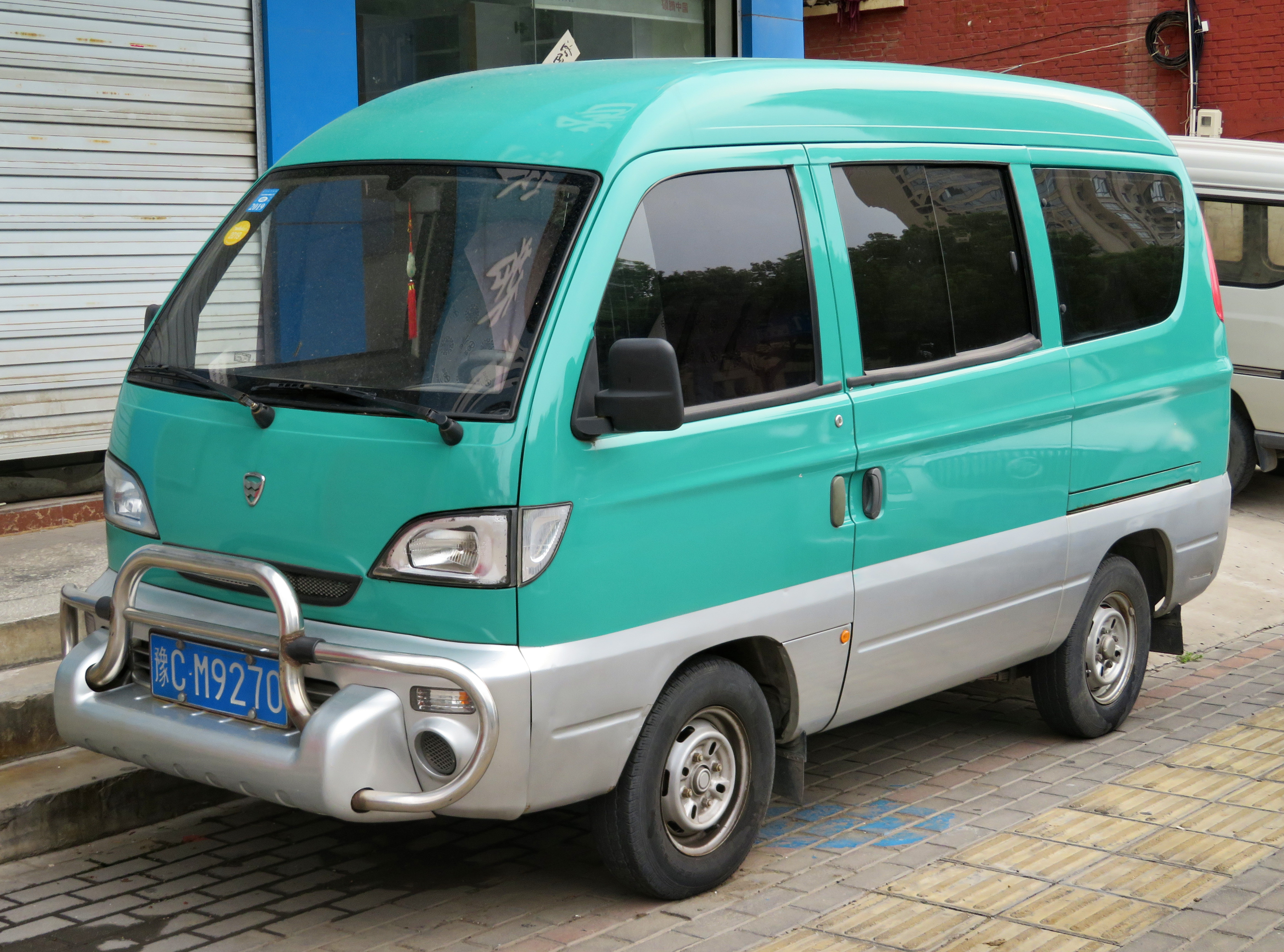

Overview
- Manufacturer: Hafei Motor
- Also called: Hafei Songhuajiang-Zhongyi; Hafei Xinzhongyi; Hafei Carga; Effa VAN; Effa Furgão; Micro MPV Junior
- Production: 1999–2015
- Designer: Pininfarina

Body and chassis
- Class: Microvan
- Body style: Cab-forward van Cab-forward pickup
- Related: Hafei Ruiyi; CMC Varica

Powertrain
- Engine: 1.0 L DAM10R I4; 1.3 L DAM13R I4
- Transmission: 5 speed manual

Chronology
- Predecessor: Hafei Songhuajiang
- Successor: Hafei Zhongyi V5

The Hafei Zhongyi (Chinese: 哈飞中意; pinyin: Hāfēi Zhòngyì) is a cabover microvan produced by the Chinese manufacturer Hafei Motor and developed in partnership with Pininfarina.

== Overview ==
The Zhongyi is sold in Brazil and Uruguay under the brand Effa Motors.

It was presented in 1999 Beijing Motor Show.

In December 2007, Zhongyi was launched in Chile together with the Ruiyi and Lobo. Microvans were extremely popular in Chile during the late 1970s and 1980s, and are widely known as pan de molde (sliced bread).

The Zhongyi was sold as a utility van in the United States by MAG International Inc. under the name "C-MAG".

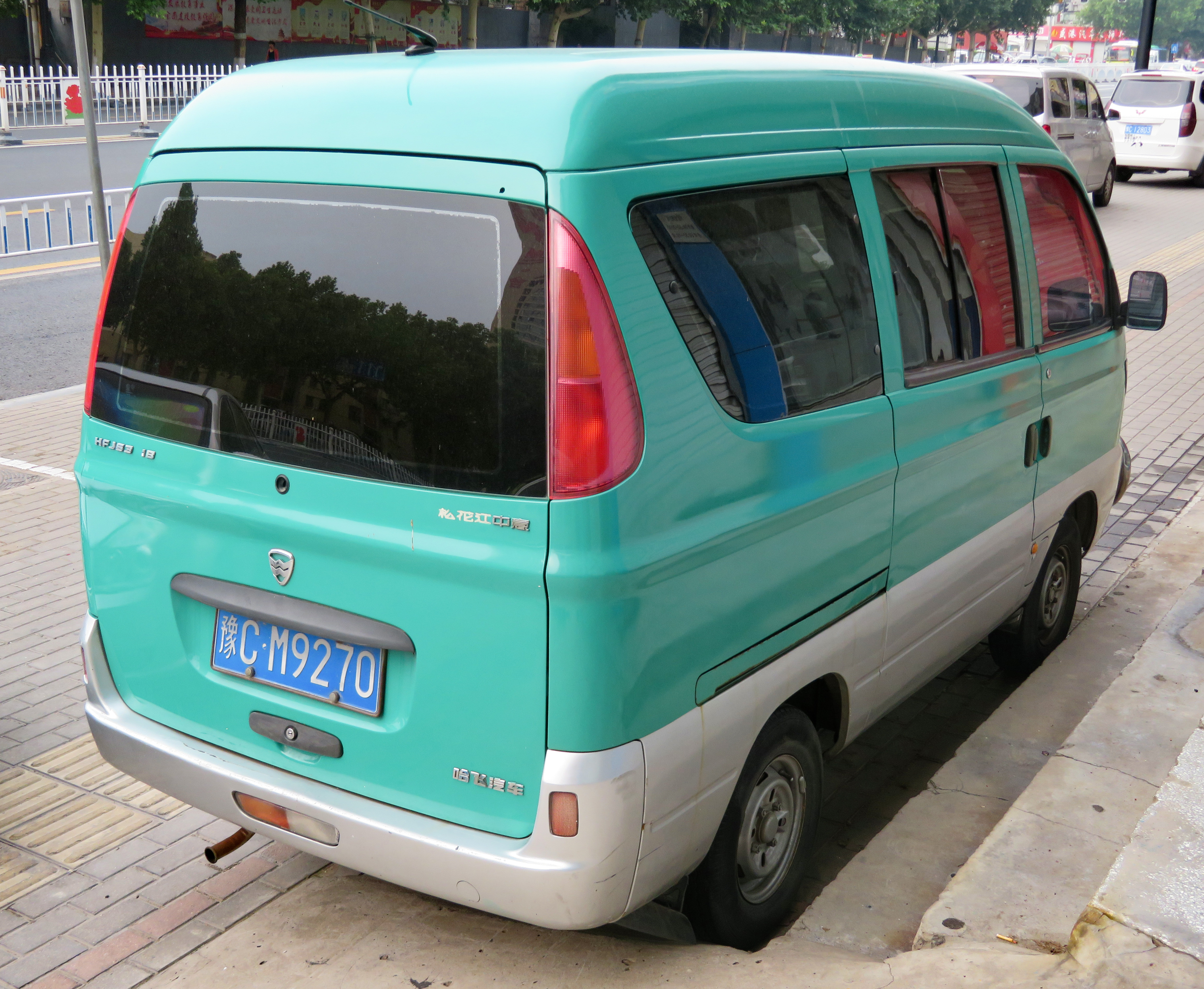
Passenger version rear view

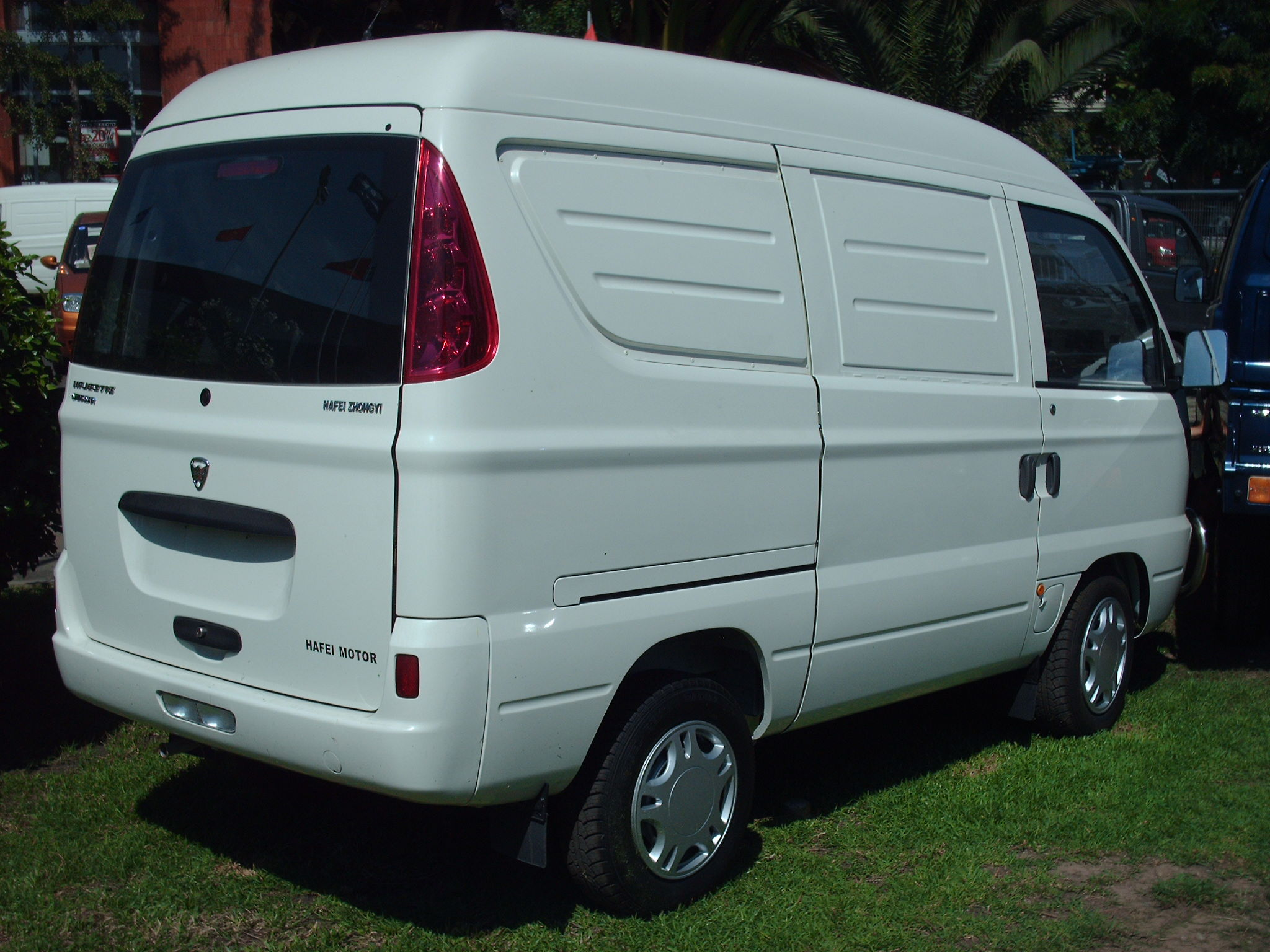
Utility version rear view

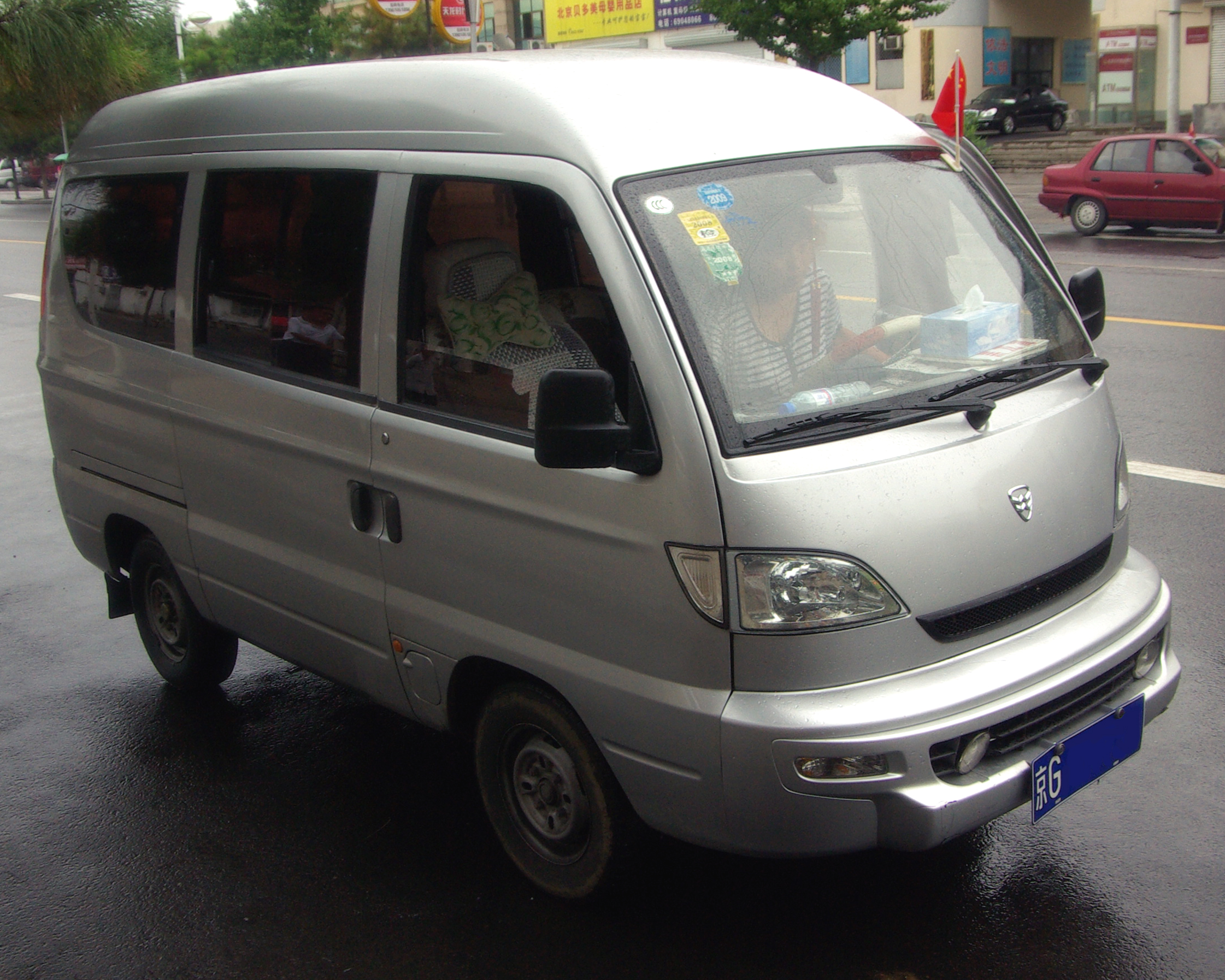
Hafei Zhongyi HFJ6376

== See also ==
- Hafei Ruiyi
