= Hafei Ruiyi =

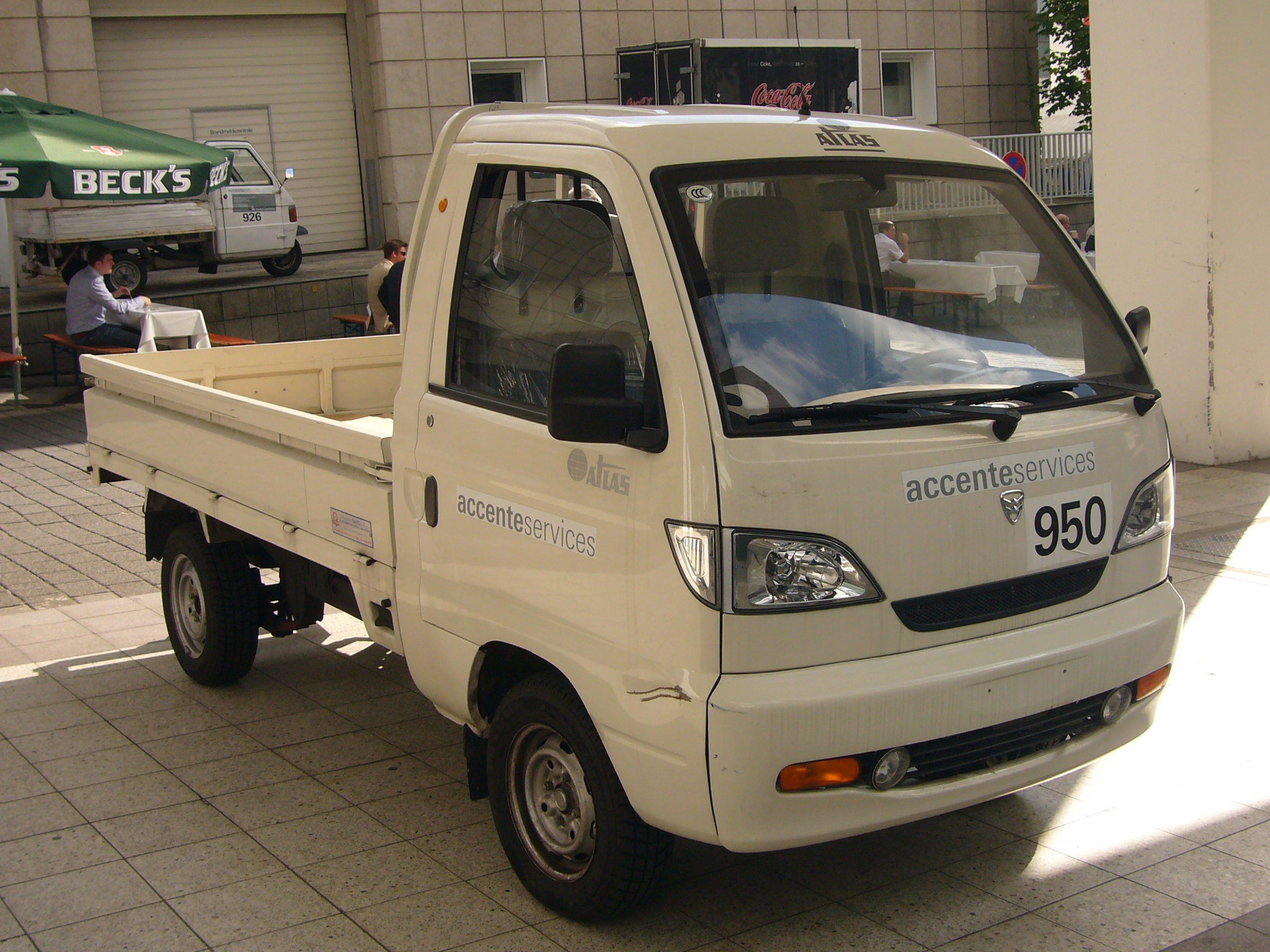

Overview
- Manufacturer: Hafei Motor
- Also called: Effa Picape (Brazil); MAC T-MAG (United States); Hafei Towner (Brazil)
- Production: 1999–present
- Designer: Pininfarina

Body and chassis
- Class: Microvan; Pickup truck
- Body style: Cab-forward pickup
- Related: Hafei Zhongyi; CMC Varica

Powertrain
- Engine: 1.0 L DAM10R I4; 1.3 L DAM13R I4
- Transmission: 5 speed manual

The Hafei Ruiyi is a microvan-derived cabover pickup truck produced by Chinese manufacturer Hafei Motor and developed in partnership with Pininfarina. The Ruiyi is sold in Brazil and Uruguay under the brand Effa Motors.

== Overview ==
The Hafei Ruiyi is essentially the pickup version of the Hafei Zhongyi, with the front end of the cab unit being identical to the microvan.

In December 2007, the Ruiyi was launched in Chile together with the Zhongyi and Lobo. Microvans and their pickup derivates were extremely popular in Chile during the late 1970s and 80's, and are widely known as pan de molde (sliced bread), basically the same name known in China, mian bao che (bread loaf car (van) because of their shape.

The Hafei Ruiyi is sold as a utility truck in the United States by Mag International Inc. The truck is known in the US as T-MAG and/or T-MAG XC. MAG is also the sole developer and provider of an electric version of the truck.

== Gallery ==
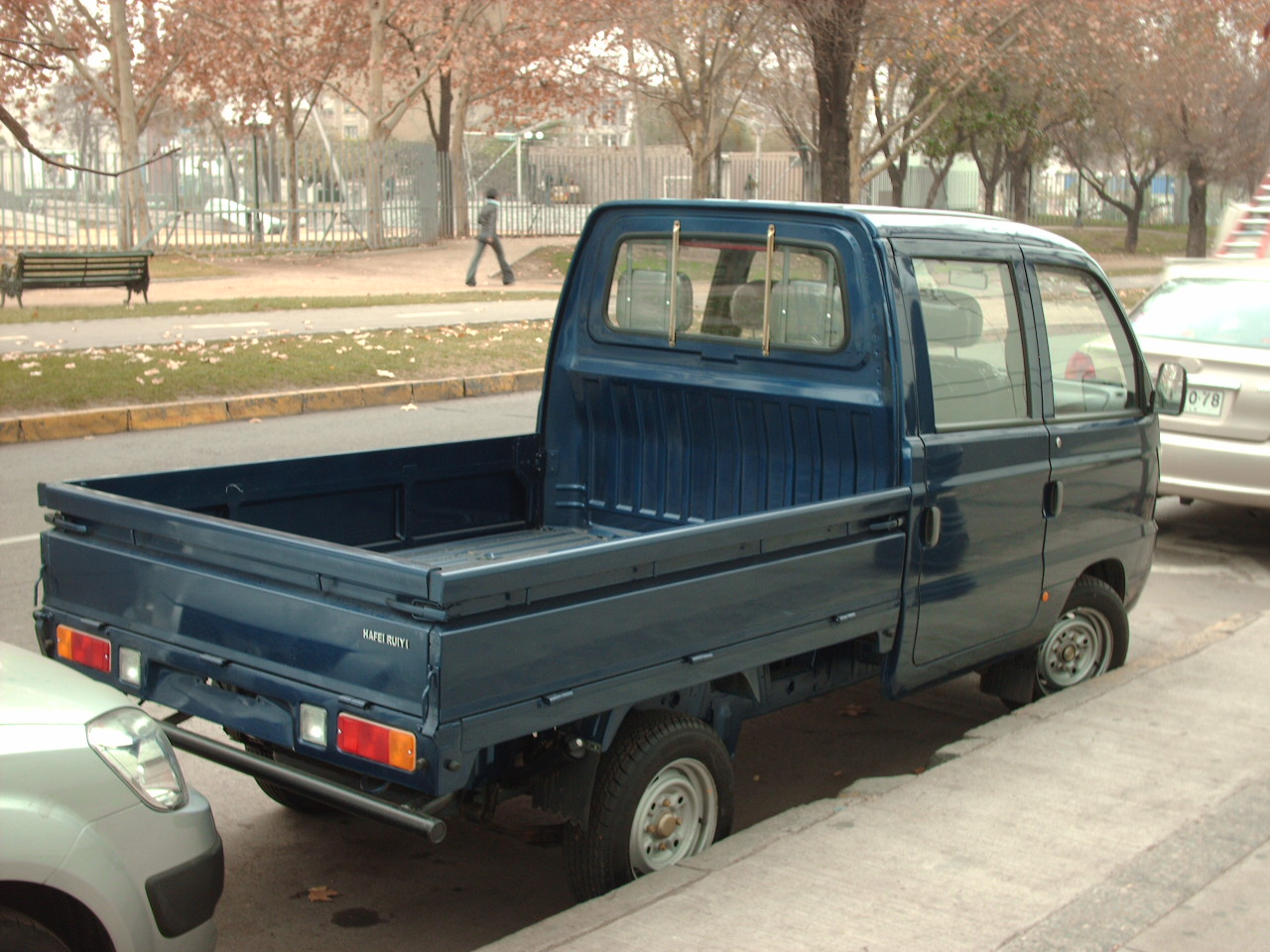
Hafei Ruiyi double-cab. Rear view.

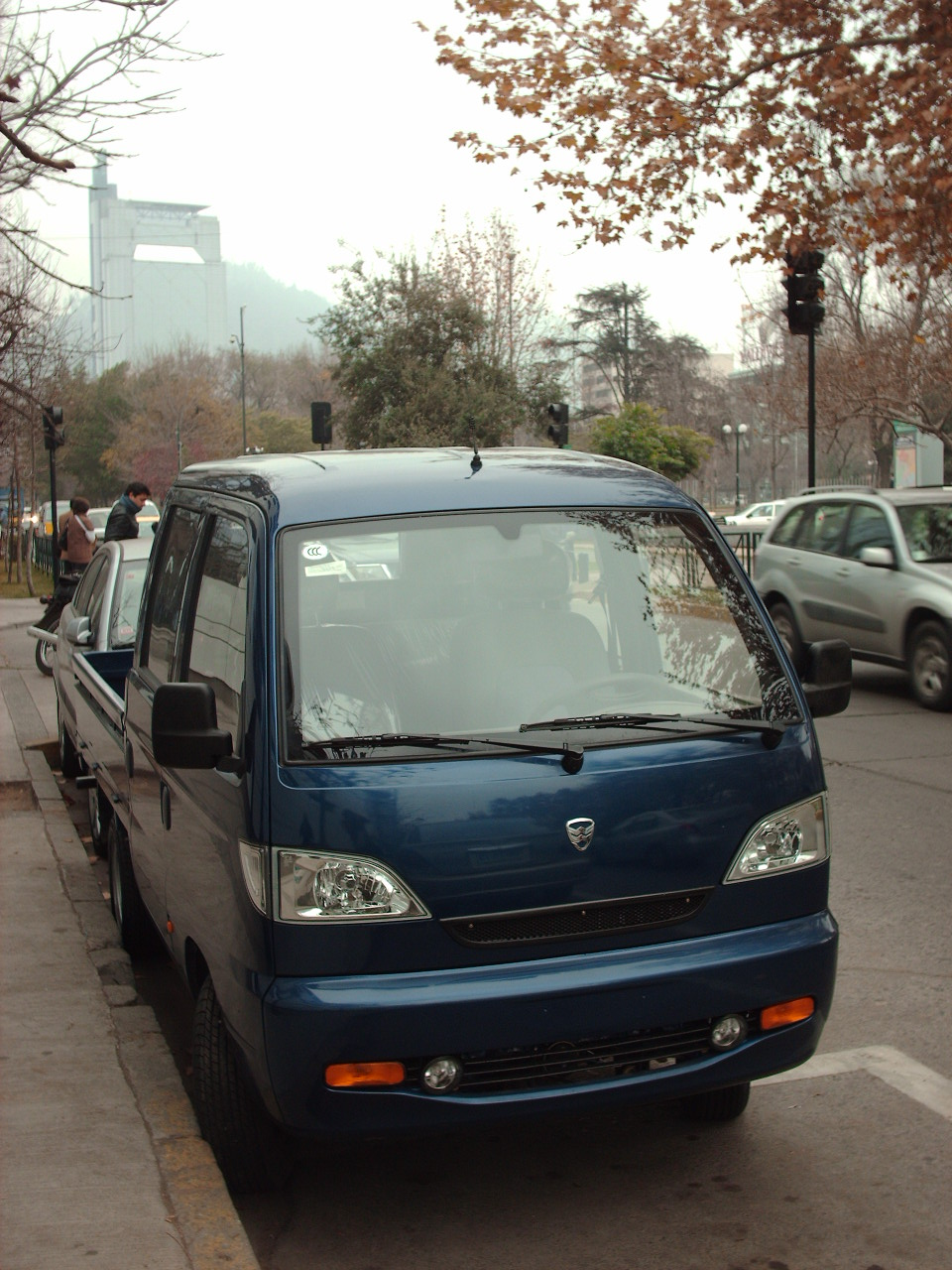
Telefónica CTC Chile building in the distance

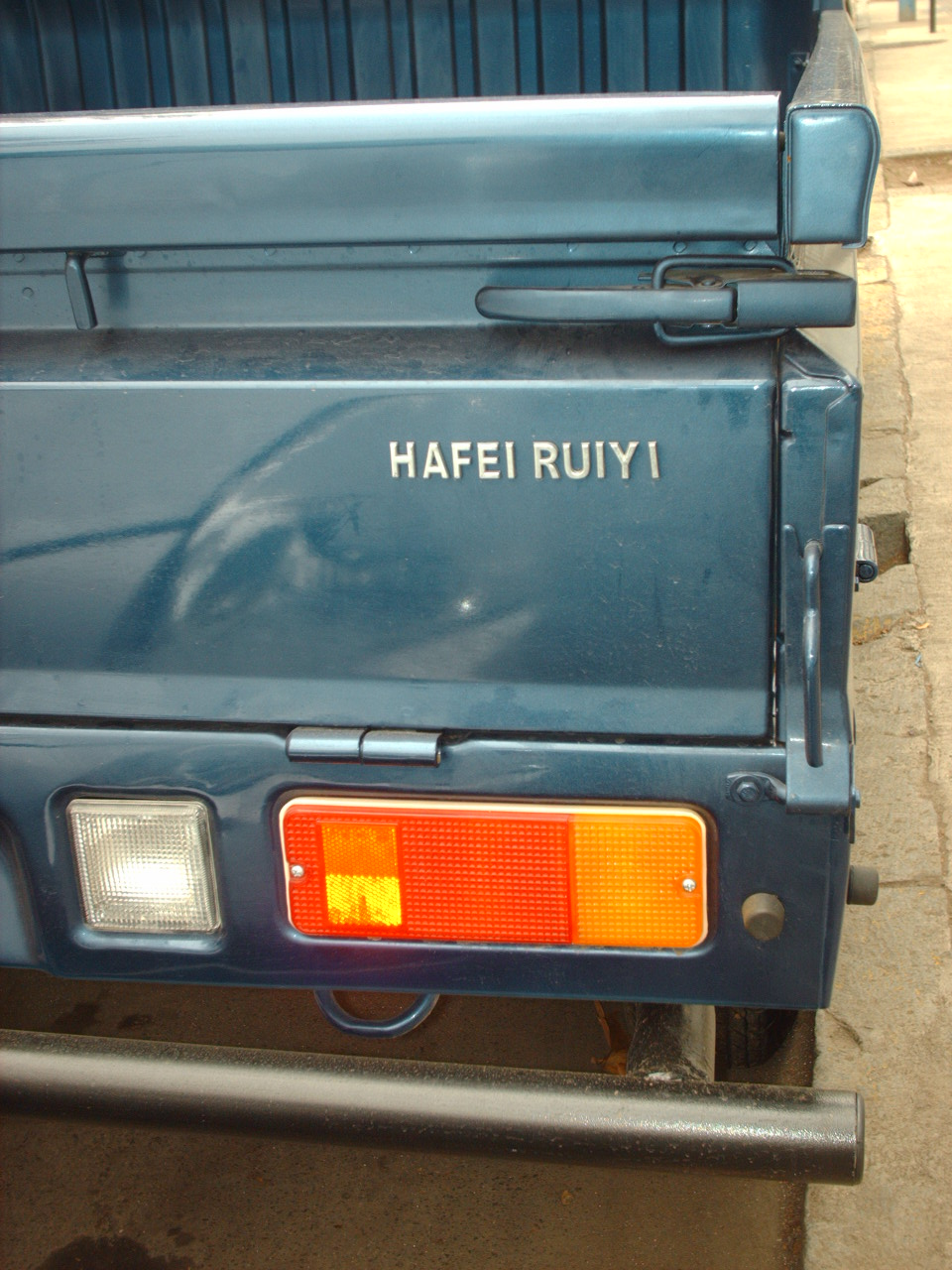
Ruiyi lettering

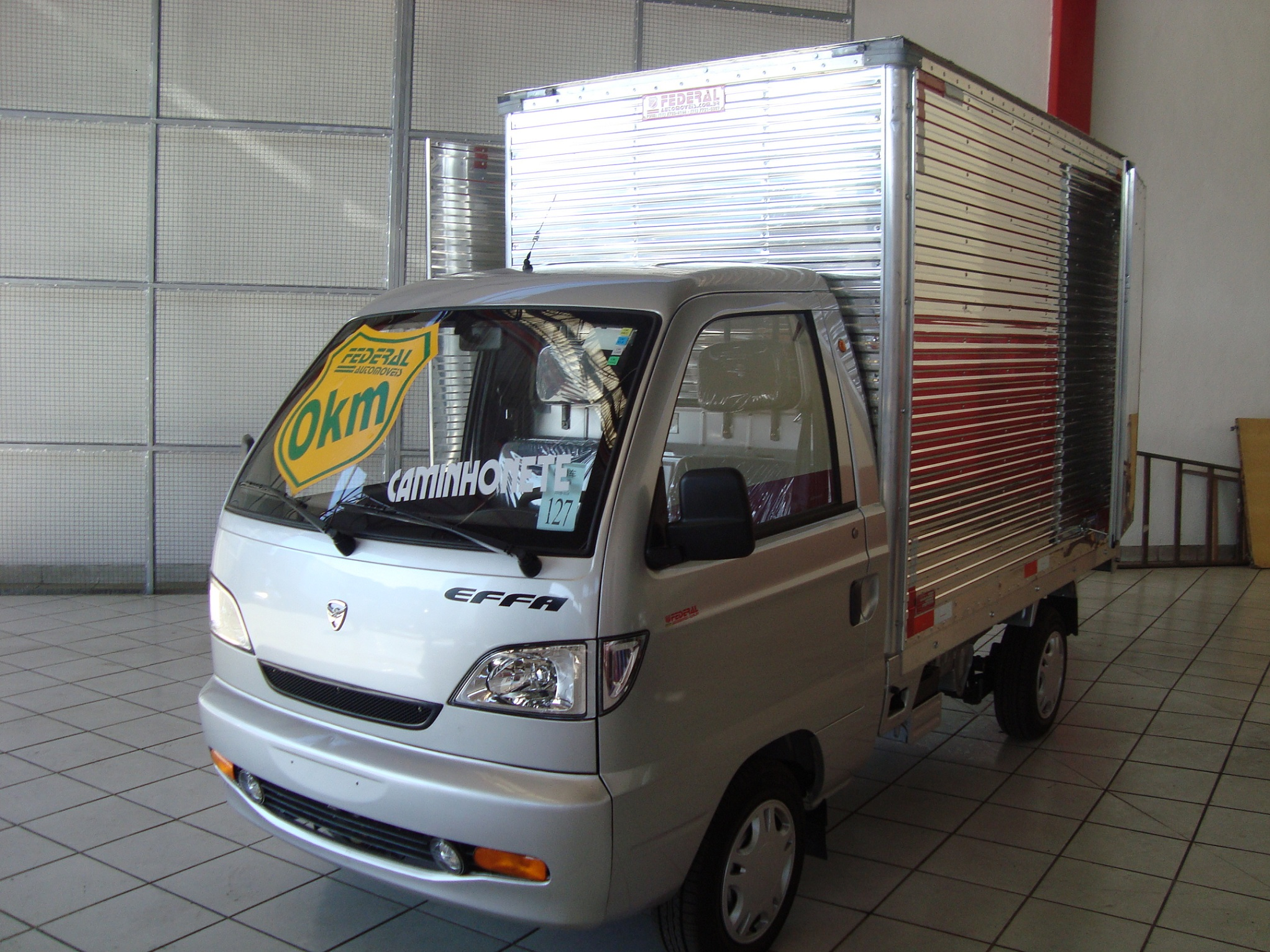
Hafei Ruiyi (Effa Picape), single cab version

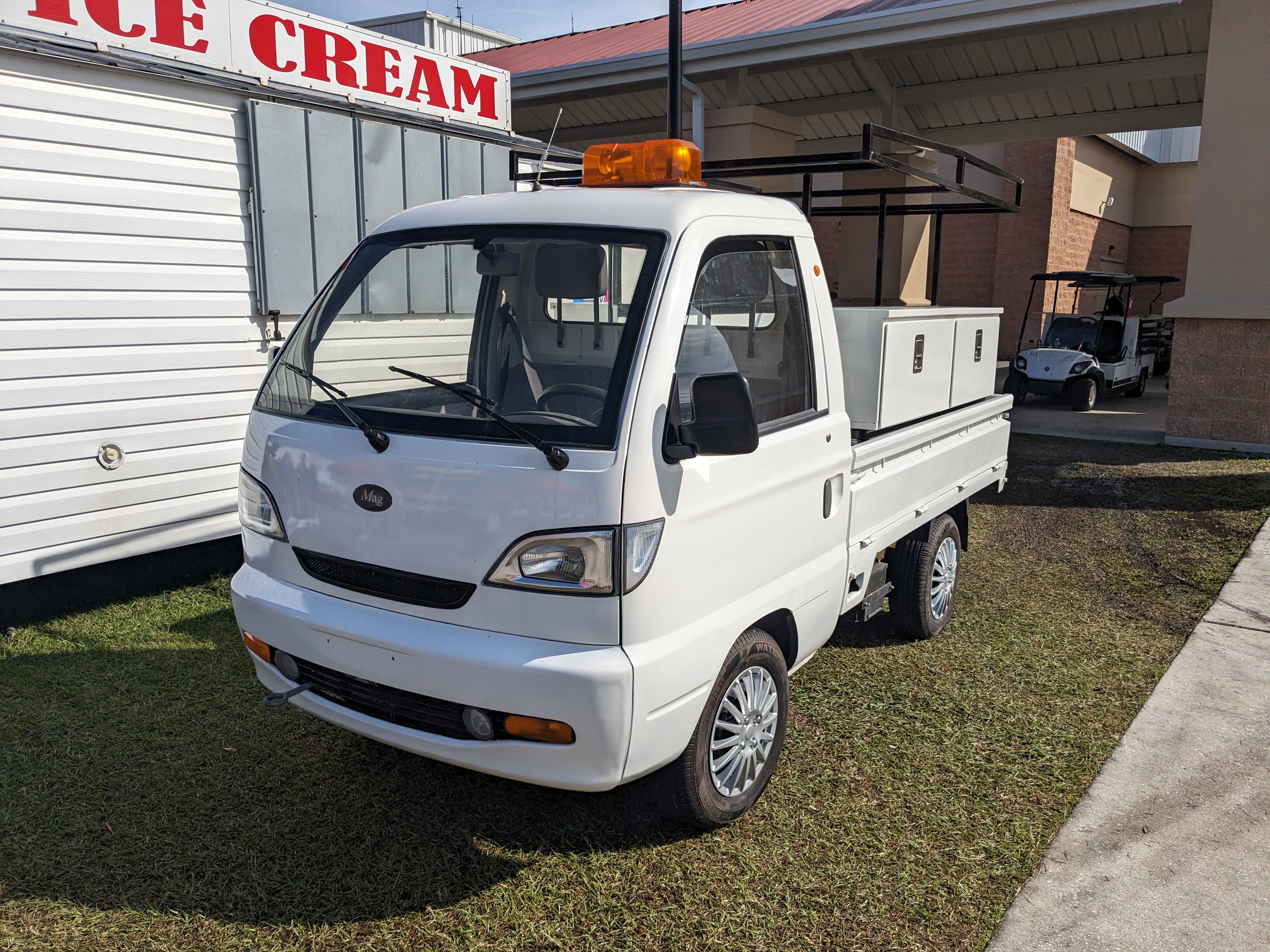
US Market MAG version

== See also ==
- Hafei Zhongyi
