= Changhe Ideal =

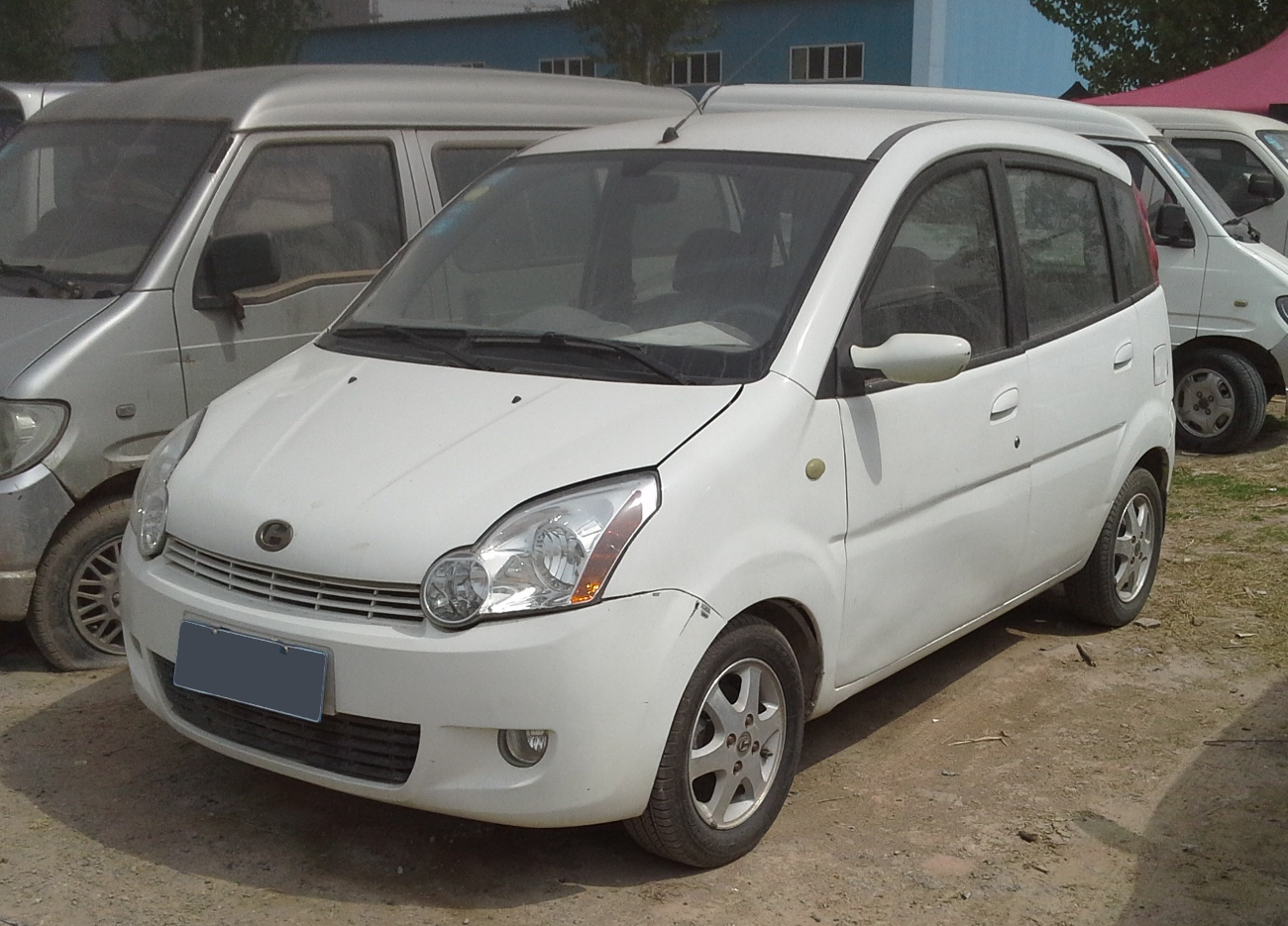

Overview
- Manufacturer: Changhe
- Also called: Effa M100; Effa Ideal; Martin Motors Ideal 1000
- Production: 2003–2016
- Designer: Giuliano Biasio at Bertone

Body and chassis
- Class: City car
- Body style: 5-door hatchback

Powertrain
- Engine: 1.0 L DA465Q-2/D1 I4; 1.1 L DA468Q I4 gasoline 1.4 L K14B I4 gasoline
- Transmission: 5-speed manual

Dimensions
- Wheelbase: 2,335 mm (91.9 in)
- Length: 3,560 mm (140.2 in)
- Width: 1,600 mm (63.0 in)
- Height: 1,670 mm (65.7 in)

The Changhe Ideal is a city car produced by Jiangxi Changhe Suzuki Automobile Company, in a joint-venture between Chinese and Japanese automakers Changhe and Suzuki, from 2003 to 2016. The model is known in Brazil as the Effa M100, in Uruguay as the Effa Ideal and in Italy as Martin Motors Ideal 1000.

== Overview ==
The Ideal was designed by Bertone, available initially with a 1.1-litre gasoline engine and safety items such as anti-lock braking system and airbags. It was facelifted in 2006, when it received new lights, a new grille and an updated interior.

The Ideal was sold in Colombia as taxi mainly in 2009 and 2010, but due to the lack of quality most vehicles are out of service today.

== NICE Ze-O ==
NICE Car Company presented an electric version of the Ideal called the NICE Ze-O at the 2008 British International Motor Show, but a production version was not forthcoming. NICE shortly after went into administration and was acquired by Aixam-Mega.

== Gallery ==
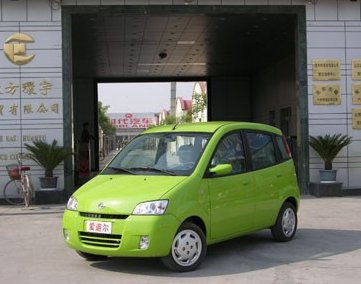
Changhe Ideal I front.

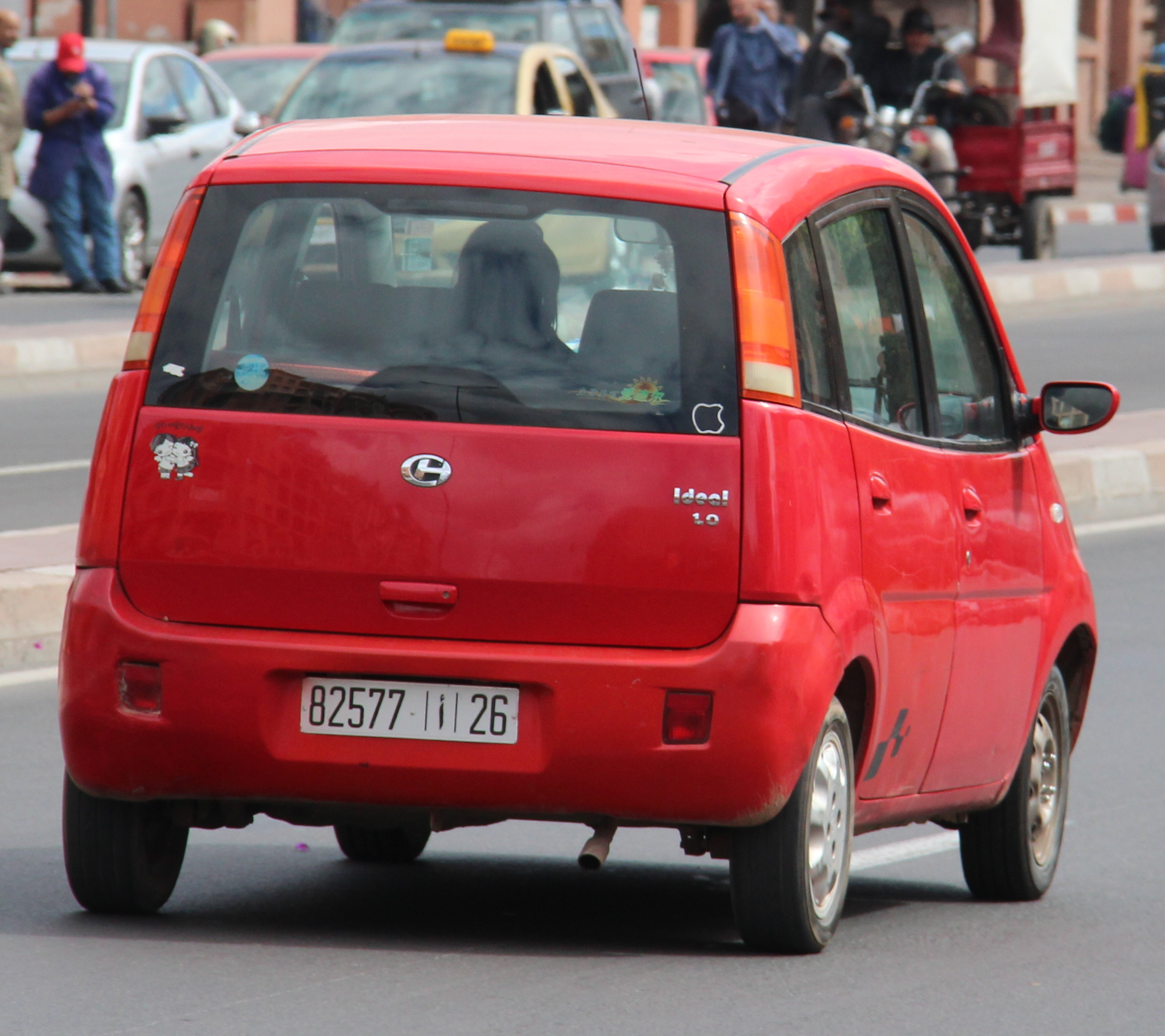
Changhe Ideal I rear.

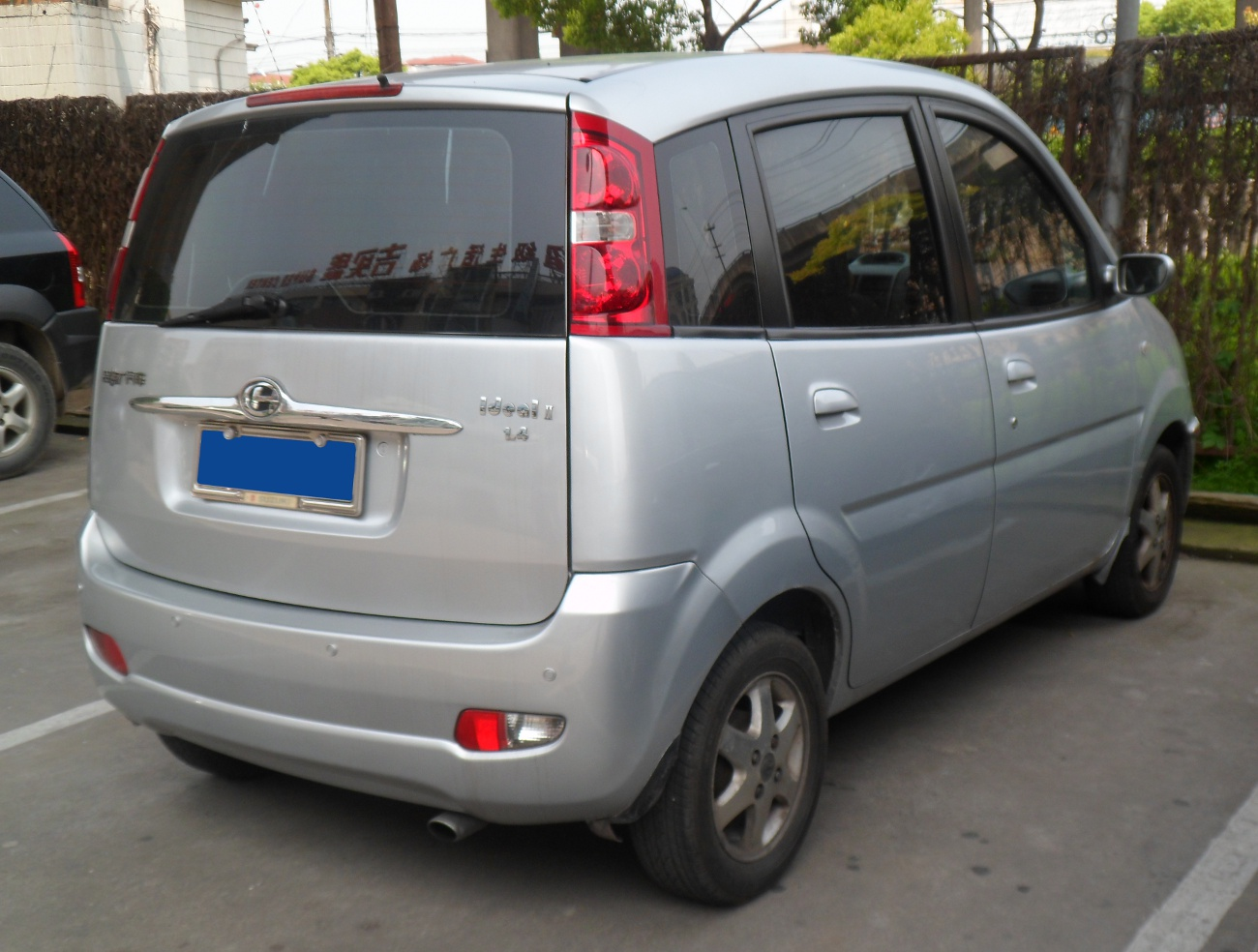
Changhe Ideal II rear.
