= Hafei Zhongyi V5 =

Chinese microvan

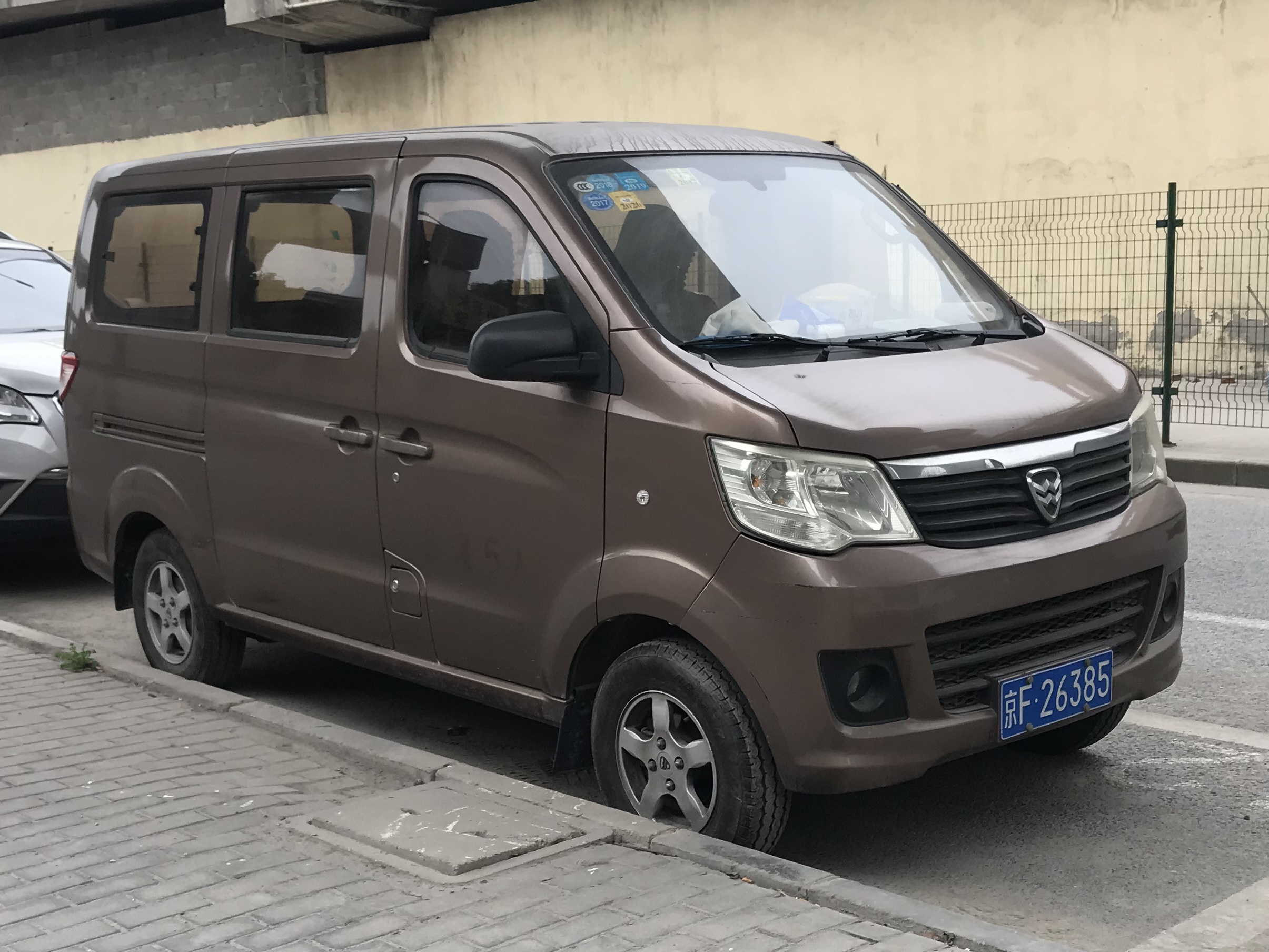

Overview
- Manufacturer: Hafei
- Production: 2013–2018
- Assembly: Chongqing, China

Body and chassis
- Class: Microvan
- Body style: 4-door minivan
- Layout: FMR layout
- Related: Chana Star 5 CMC Veryca

Powertrain
- Engine: 1.3 L I4
- Transmission: 5-speed manual

Dimensions
- Wheelbase: 2,565 mm (101.0 in)
- Length: 4,000 mm (157.5 in)
- Width: 1,625 mm (64.0 in)
- Height: 1,880 mm (74.0 in)

Chronology
- Predecessor: Hafei Zhongyi

The Hafei Zhongyi V5 is a microvan by Hafei succeeding the ancient Hafei Zhongyi. The original Hafei Zhongyi microvan was launched in 1999.

== Overview ==
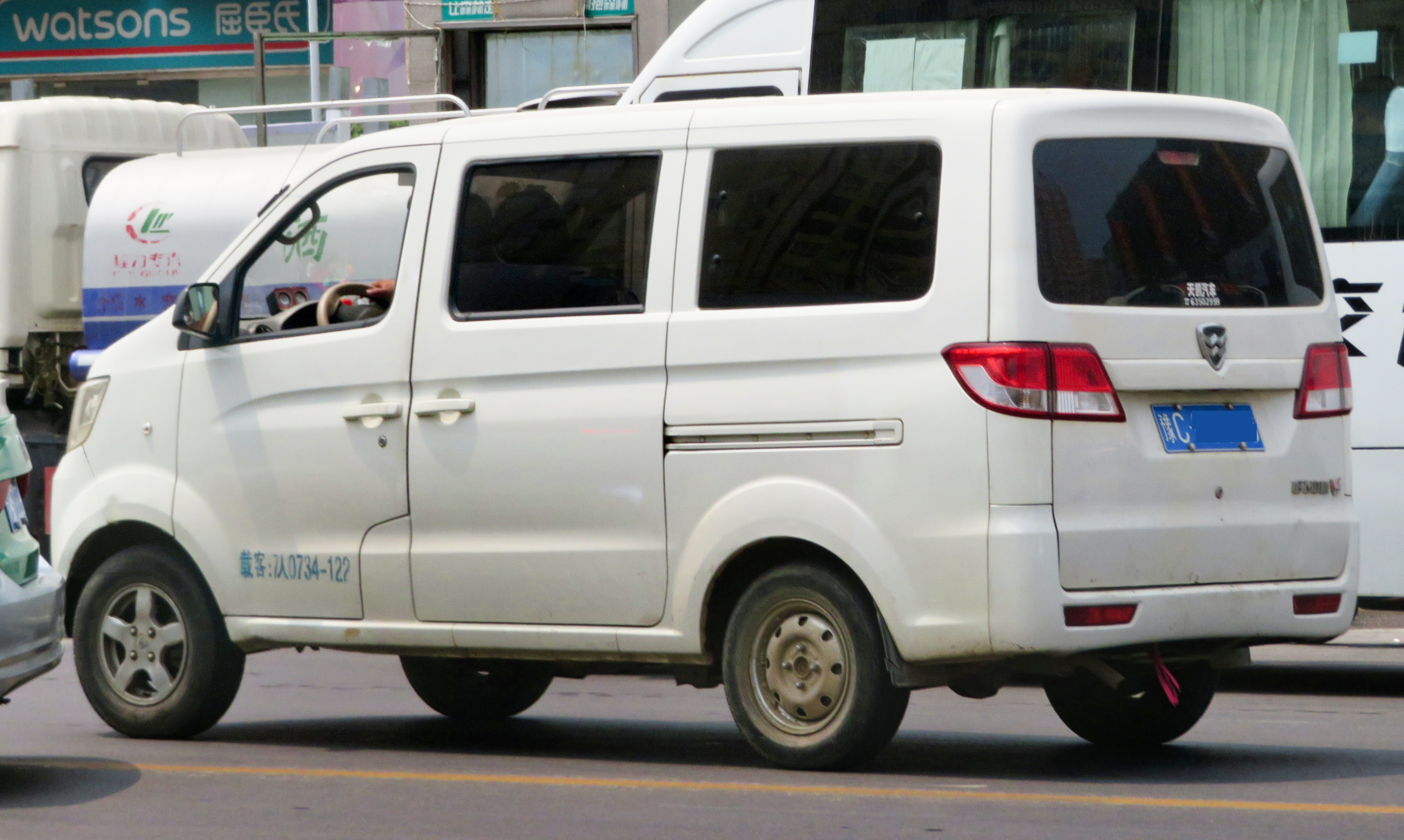
Hafei Zhongyi V5 rear

The Zhongyi V5 was launched in 2013, two years after Changan Automobile became the owner of the Hafei brand, and is based on the same platform as the Chana Star 5. Despite the styling similarity, size wise, the Hafei Zhongyi V5 is slightly larger in length, width, and wheelbase than the Chana Star 5. The Zhongyi V5 is powered by a 1.3 liter inline-4 engine producing 100hp, making it also more powerful than the Chana Star 5 that it was based on. The transmission is a 5-speed manual gearbox.
