= Effa Motors =

Uruguayan automobile and commercial vehicle manufacturer

- Industry: Automotive
- Founded: 2006
- Headquarters: San José de Mayo, Uruguay

Effa Motors is a Uruguayan automobile and commercial vehicle manufacturer with headquarters in San José de Mayo in southern Uruguay. The company was founded by Eduardo Effa in 2006 for the construction of the vehicles imported as CKD kits used. Effa is located in the same workshop as the defunct automaker Dolce Vitta, whose World Manufacturer Codes of 9UP, 9UR and 9US are used for beginning of Effa's vehicle identification numbers. The company is a subsidiary of the Aler Group.

Effa maintains partnerships with Chinese automakers Changhe, Hafei, Huanghai (a brand of Liaoning Shuguang), JinBei (JinBei trucks known as JBC), Jiangling Motors (JMC), Lifan and Sinotruk.

== Company history ==
The first model offered by Effa was the subcompact Effa Ideal. When exported to Brazil the vehicle was badge engineered as the Effa M100. The Effa Aojun was the first SUV/Pickup introduced in 2008. The Aojun has since been enclosed as a minivan. The Coach or the Furgón, is a flatbed pick-up truck with a single or double cab. ICalled the Effa Picape in Brazil. The Furgão, the van, the Longa and Cabine Dupla are available in Brazil. For bulky objects there is the Baú.

A second plant in Manaus started operating in 2010. Here the JMC Boarding and Effa Picape Baú are built. In addition, the models are in order Lifan 320, Lifan 520, Lifan 620, Lifan Foison and the Lifan X60 built.

In Uruguay, the second generation of the Ideal was launched. Also new is the Effa JinBei, a sister model of the Isuzu Rodeo, which was never available in Uruguay itself. Slightly larger is the Effa Plutus, which will be built for the American market in a long version.

The third manufacturer began working in Barueri in the summer of 2012, mainly producing medium and heavy-duty trucks. Additionally, the Effa Picape, Effa Van, JMC N350, and S350 JMC are built or modified here.

== Current models ==
=== Effa ===
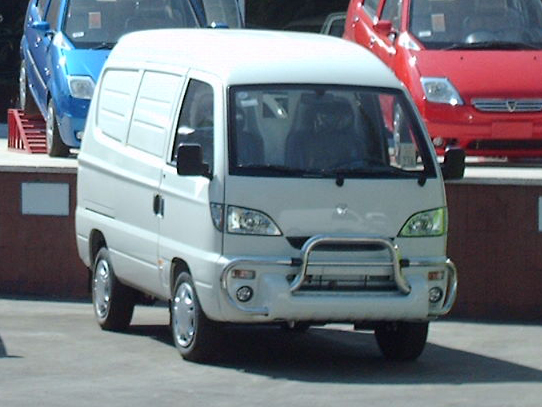
2008–present
Uruguay Effa Cargo Furgón
Brazil Effa Picape Furgão

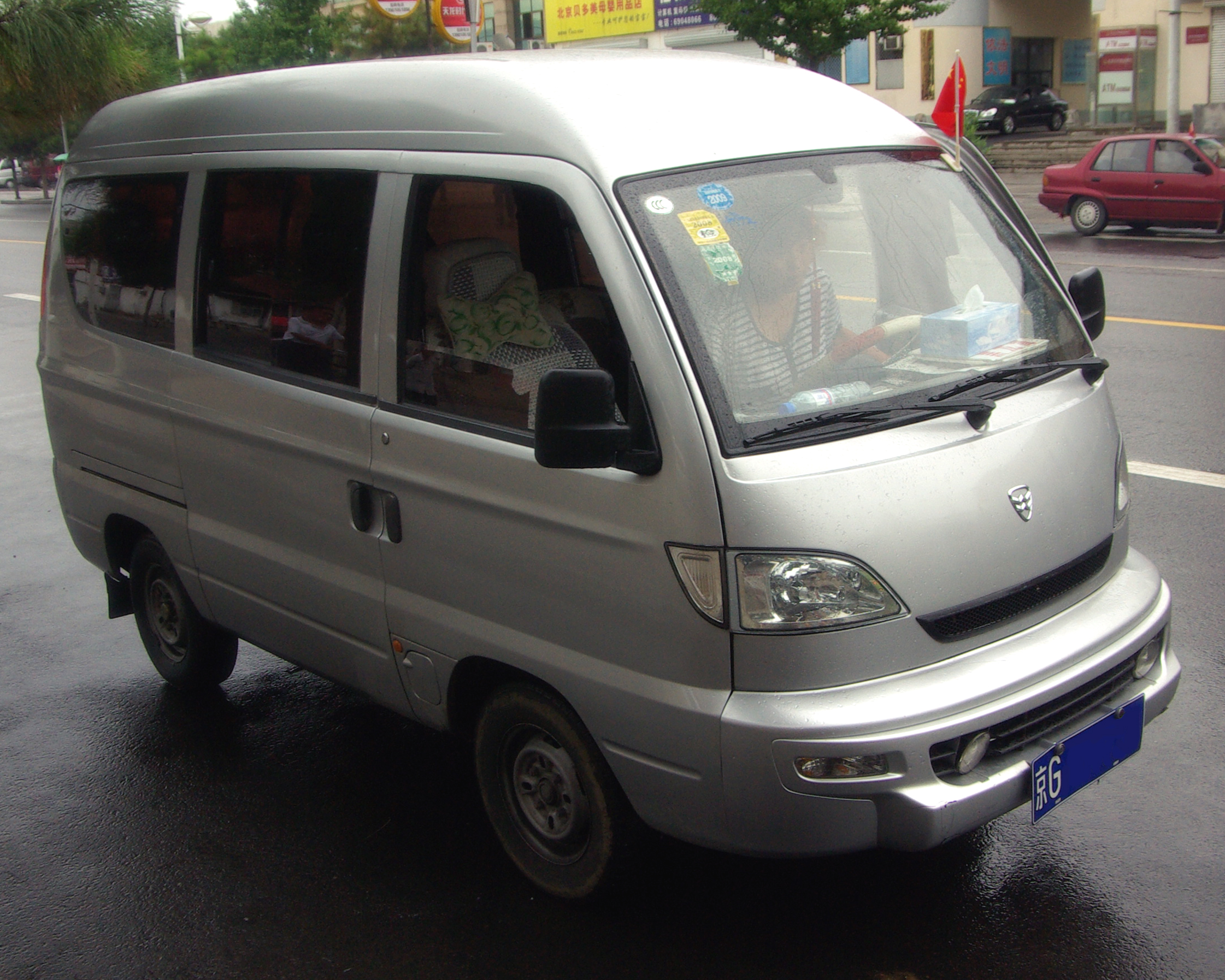
2008–present
Uruguay Effa Cargo Minibús
Brazil Effa Picape Van

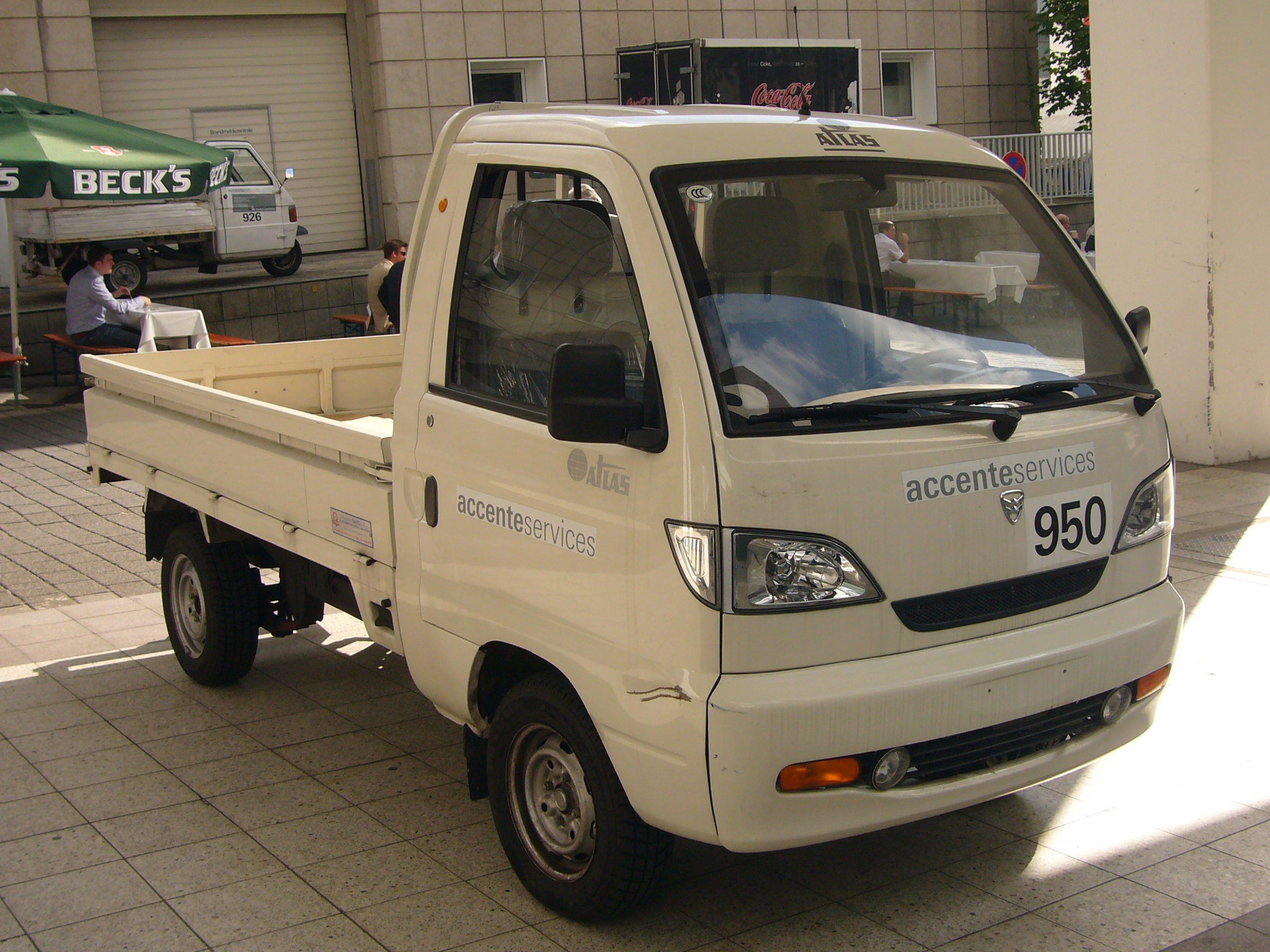
2008–present
Uruguay Effa Cargo Pick Up
Brazil Effa Picape Longa

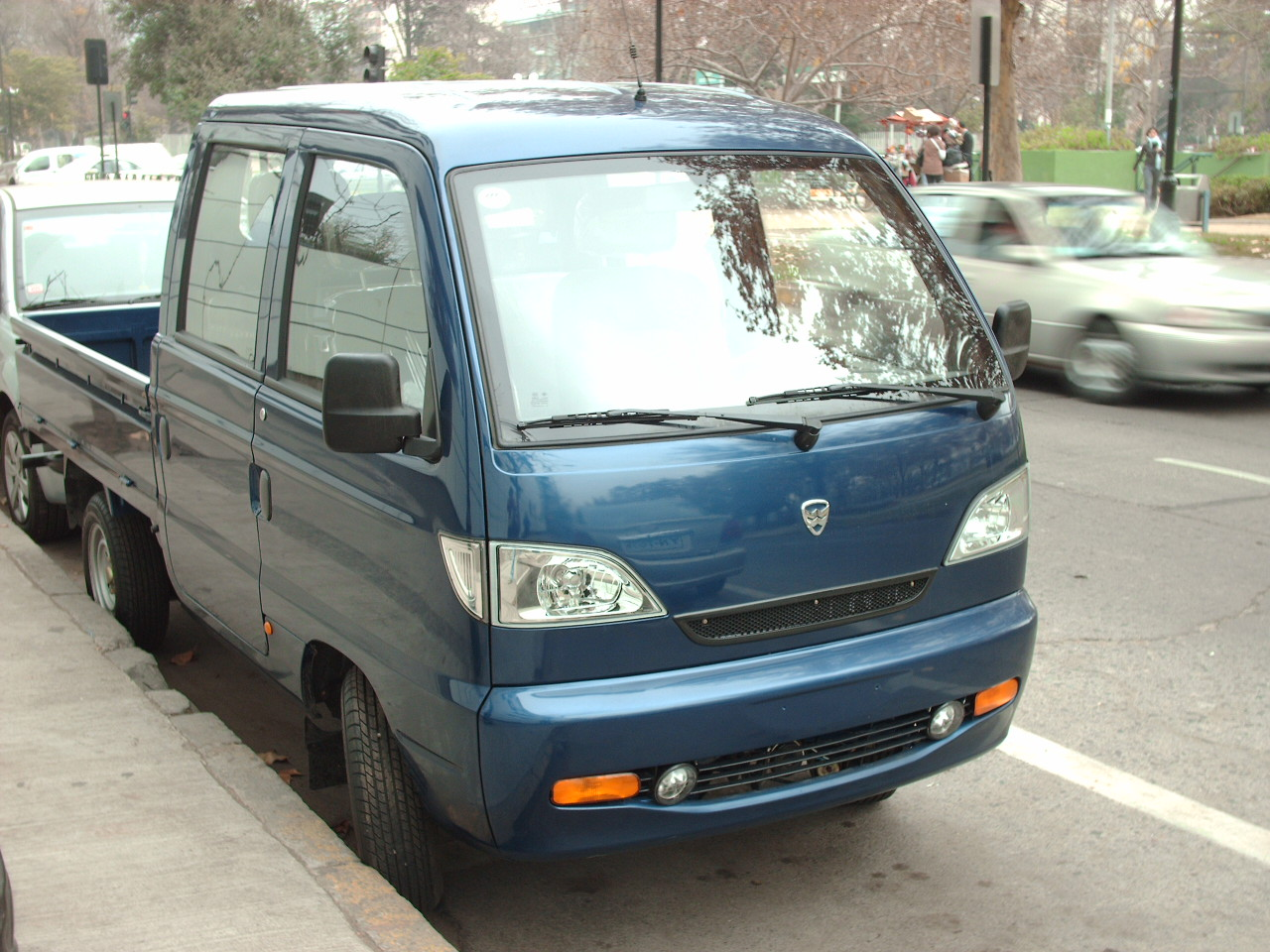
2008–present
Uruguay Effa Cargo Doble Cabina
Brazil Effa Picape Cabine Dupla

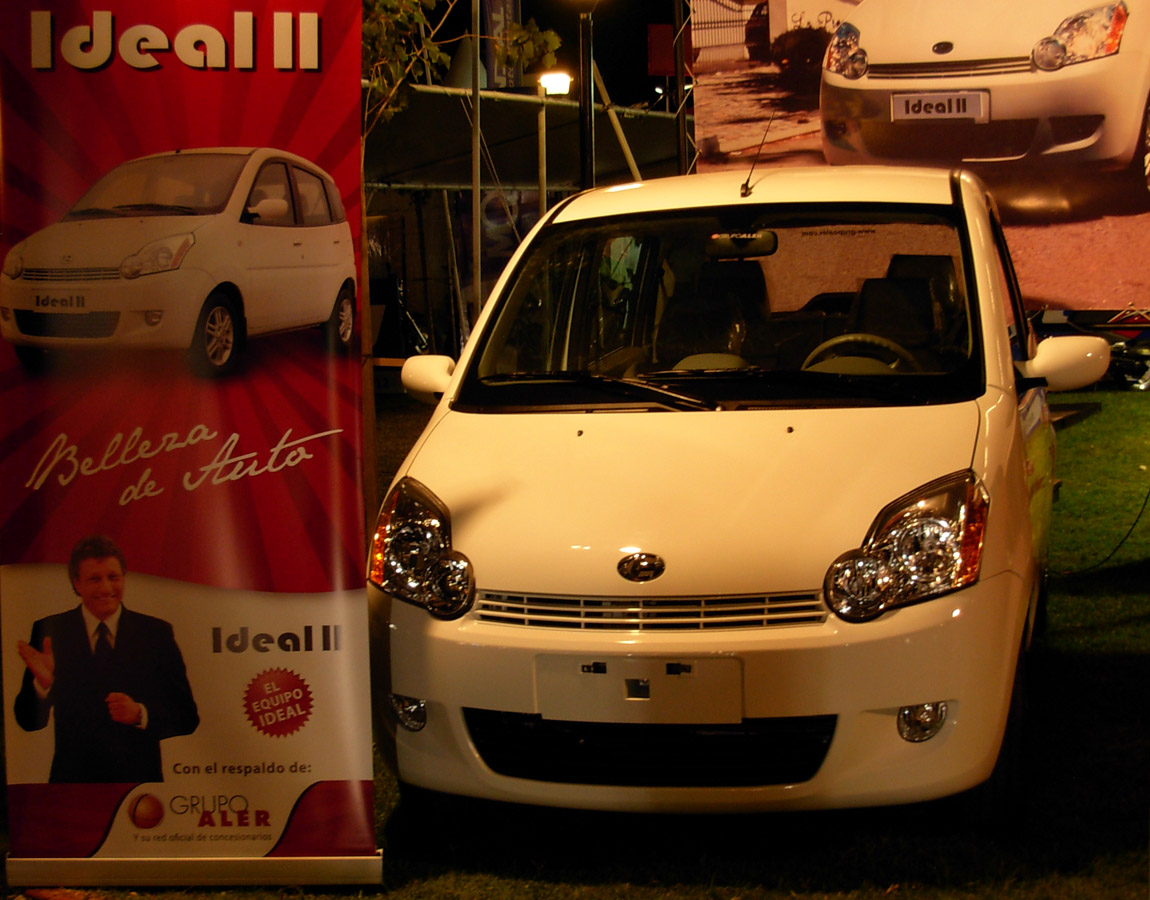
2010–present
Uruguay Changhe Ideal II
Brazil Effa M100

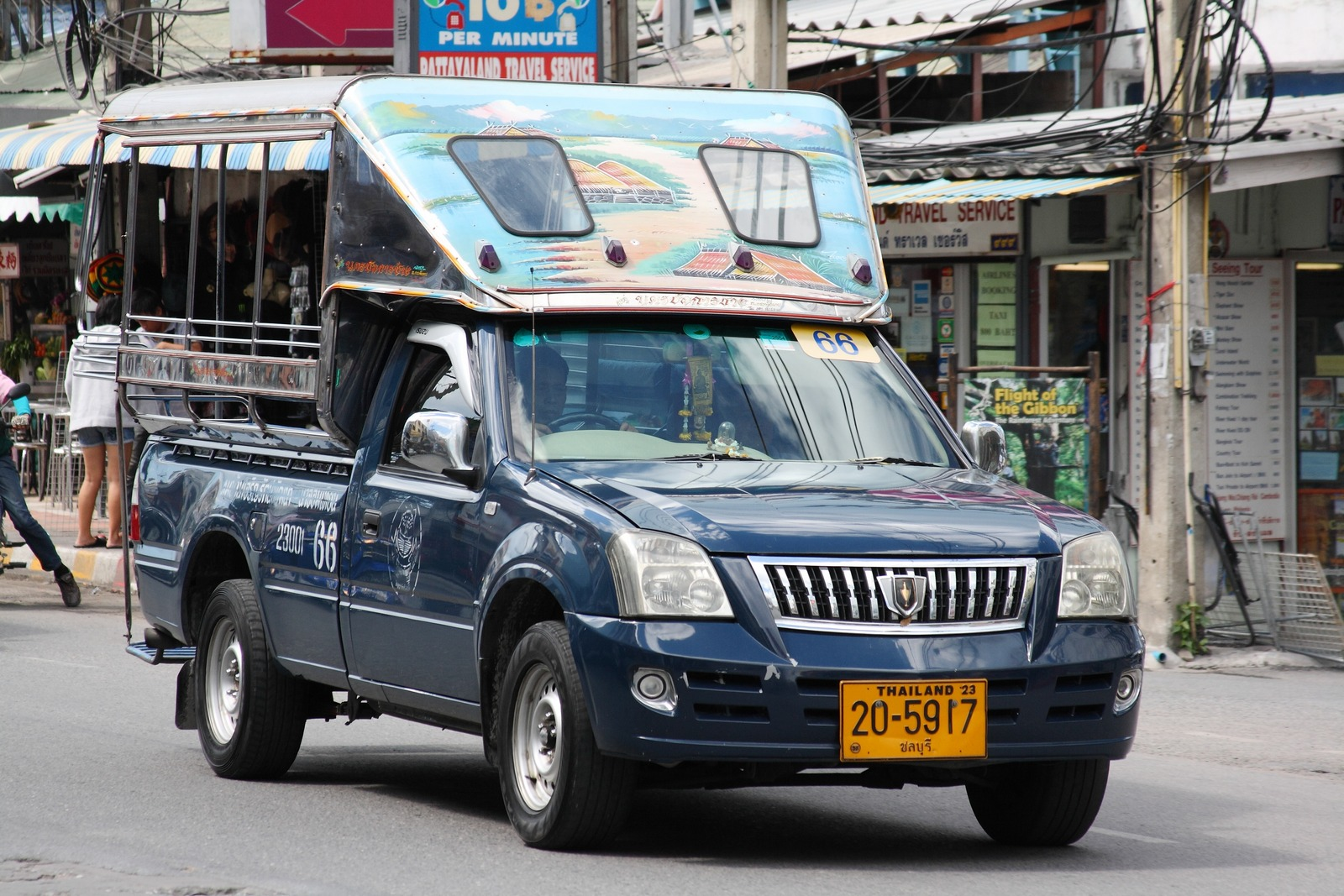
2010–present
Uruguay Effa JinBei

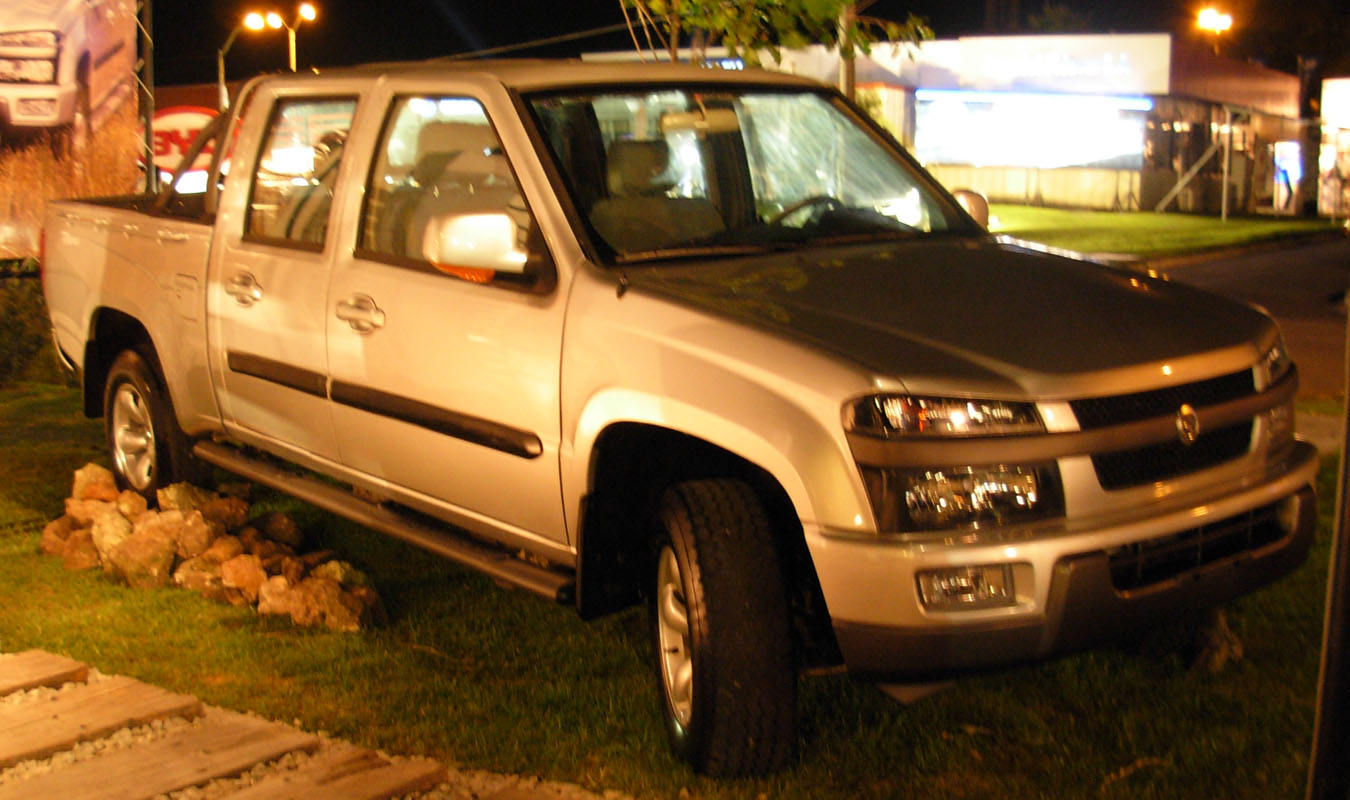
2010–present
Uruguay Effa Plutus
Brazil Effa Picape Plutus

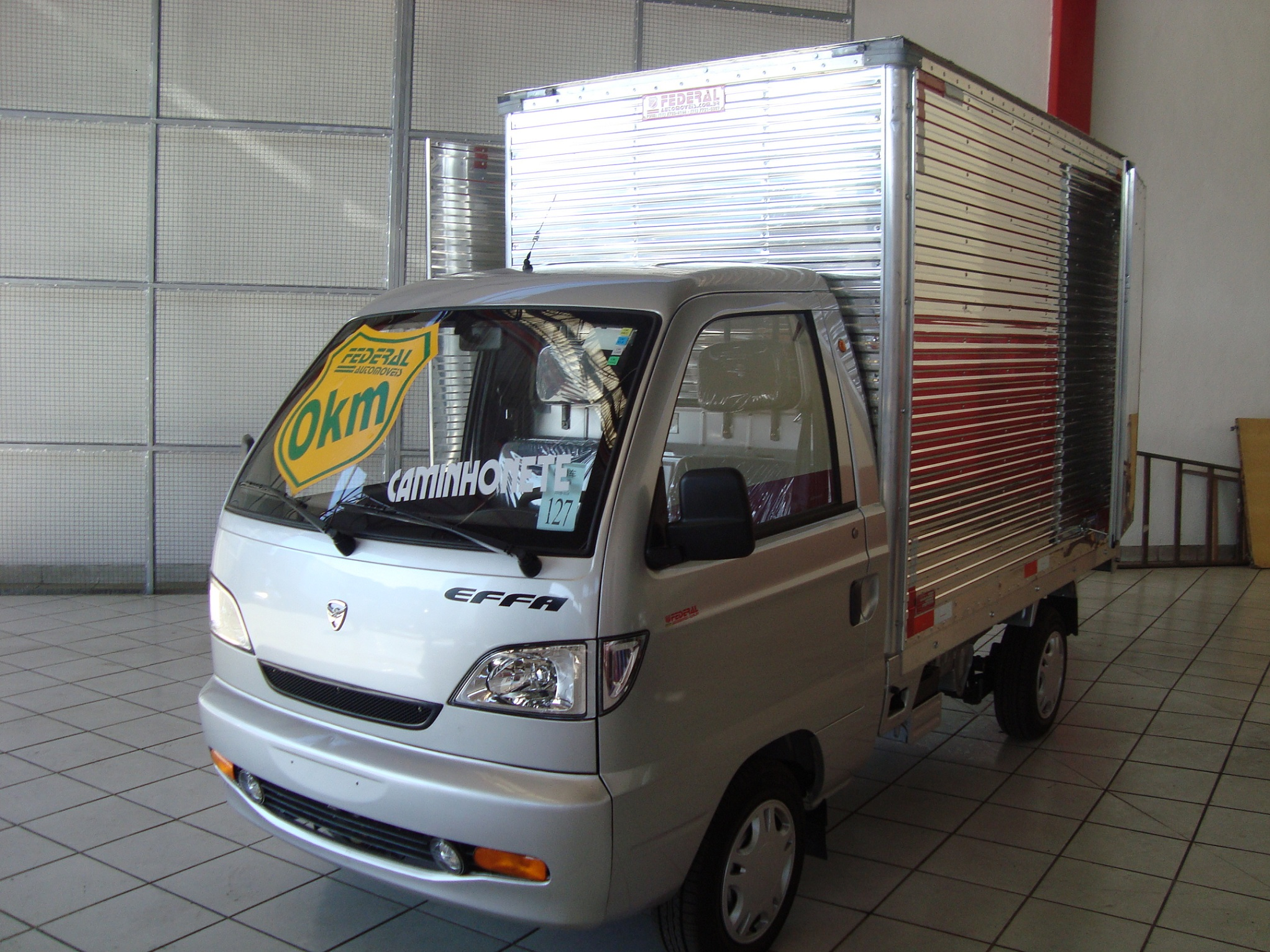
2010–present
Brazil Effa Picape Baú

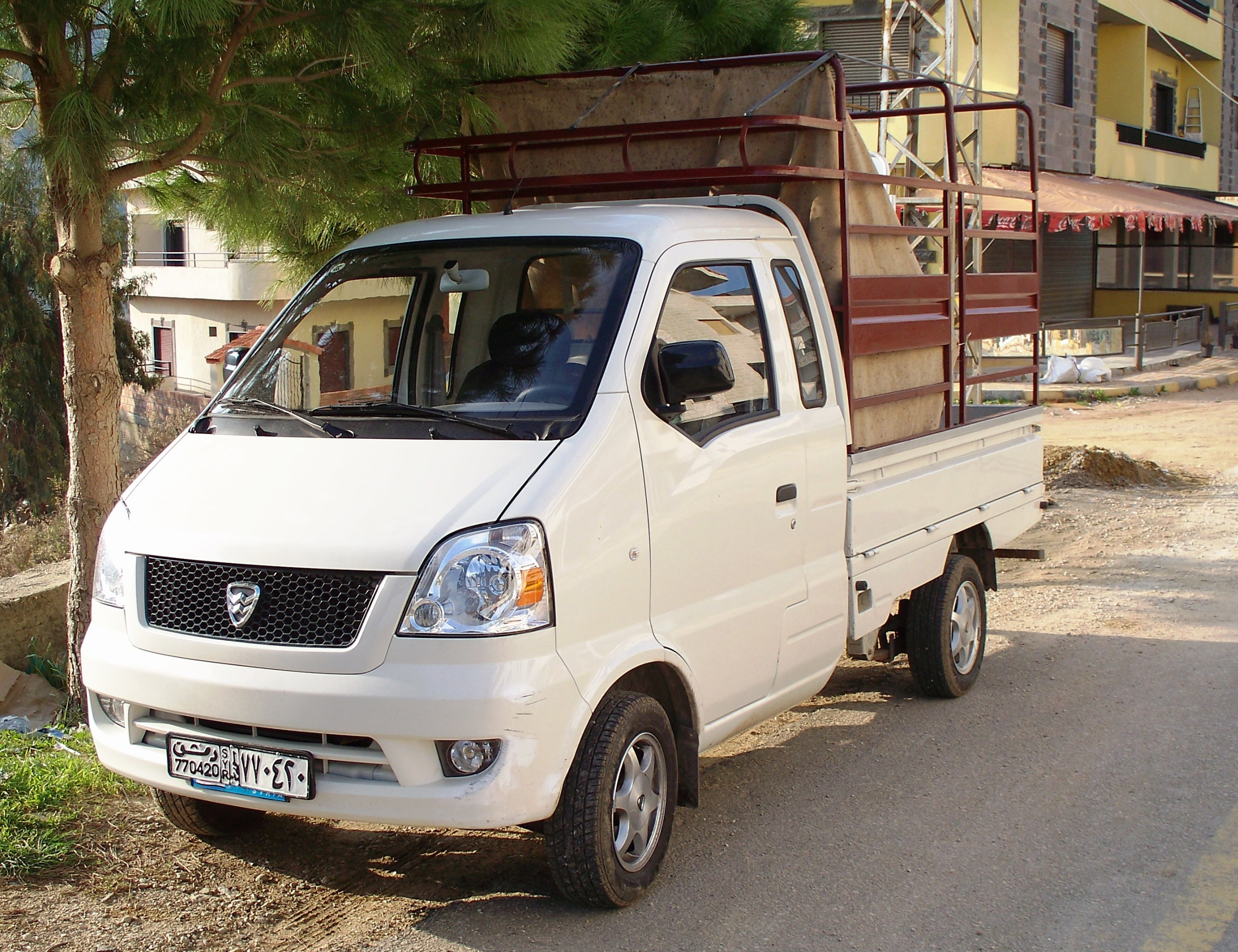
2012–present
Brazil Effa Picape Start
- Effa Aojun (2008–present, Uruguay)
- Effa Start Van (2012–present, Brazil)

== Former model ==
=== Effa ===
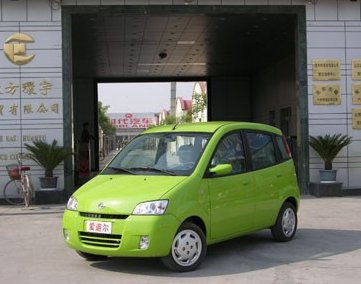
2007–2010
Uruguay Effa Ideal
Brazil Effa M100

=== Effa-JBC ===
- Effa-JBC 3.2 Turbo Intercooler (SY1040DVA, 2012–present, Brazil)

=== Effa-JMC ===
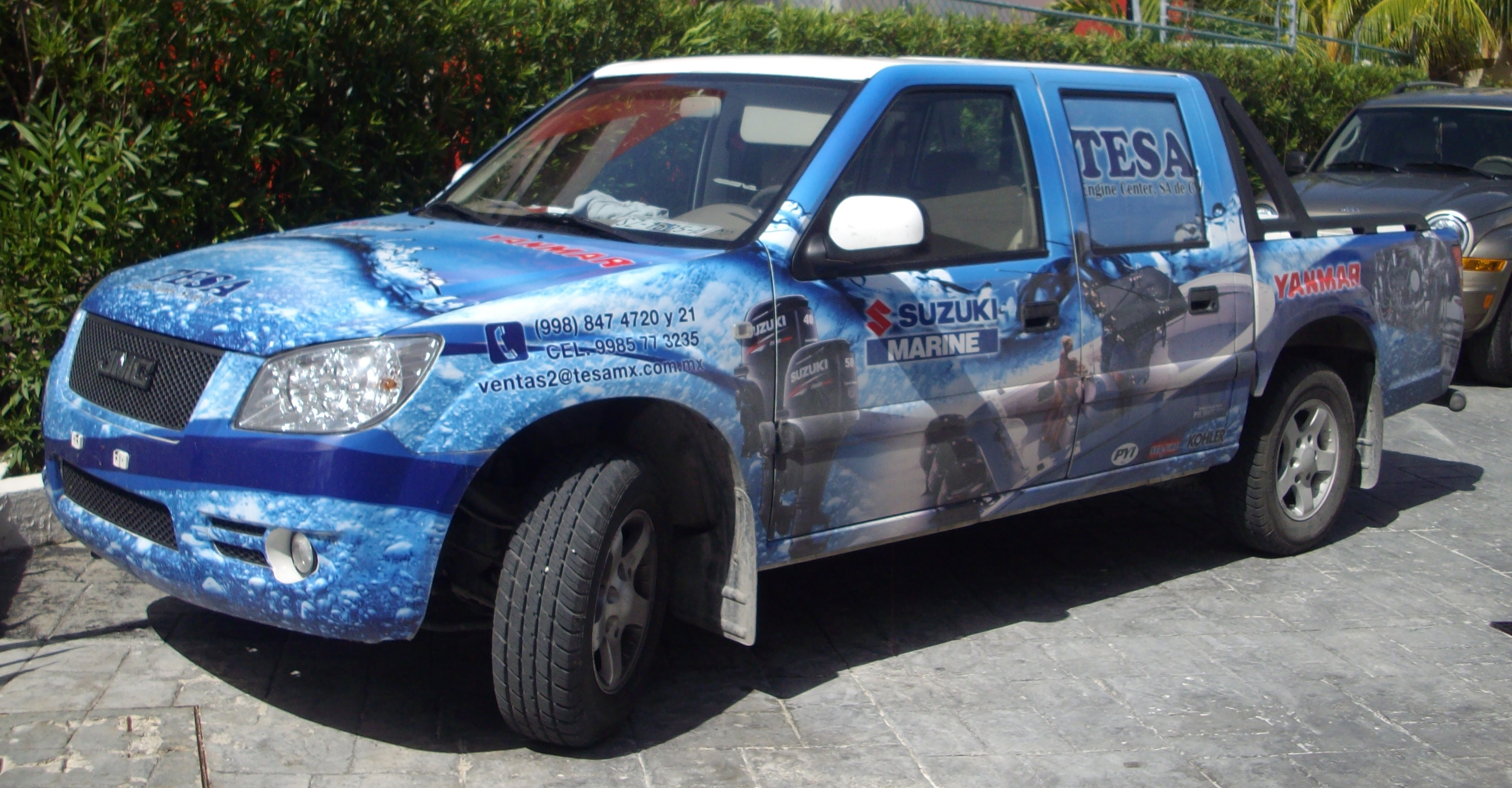
JMC Boarding
2010–present

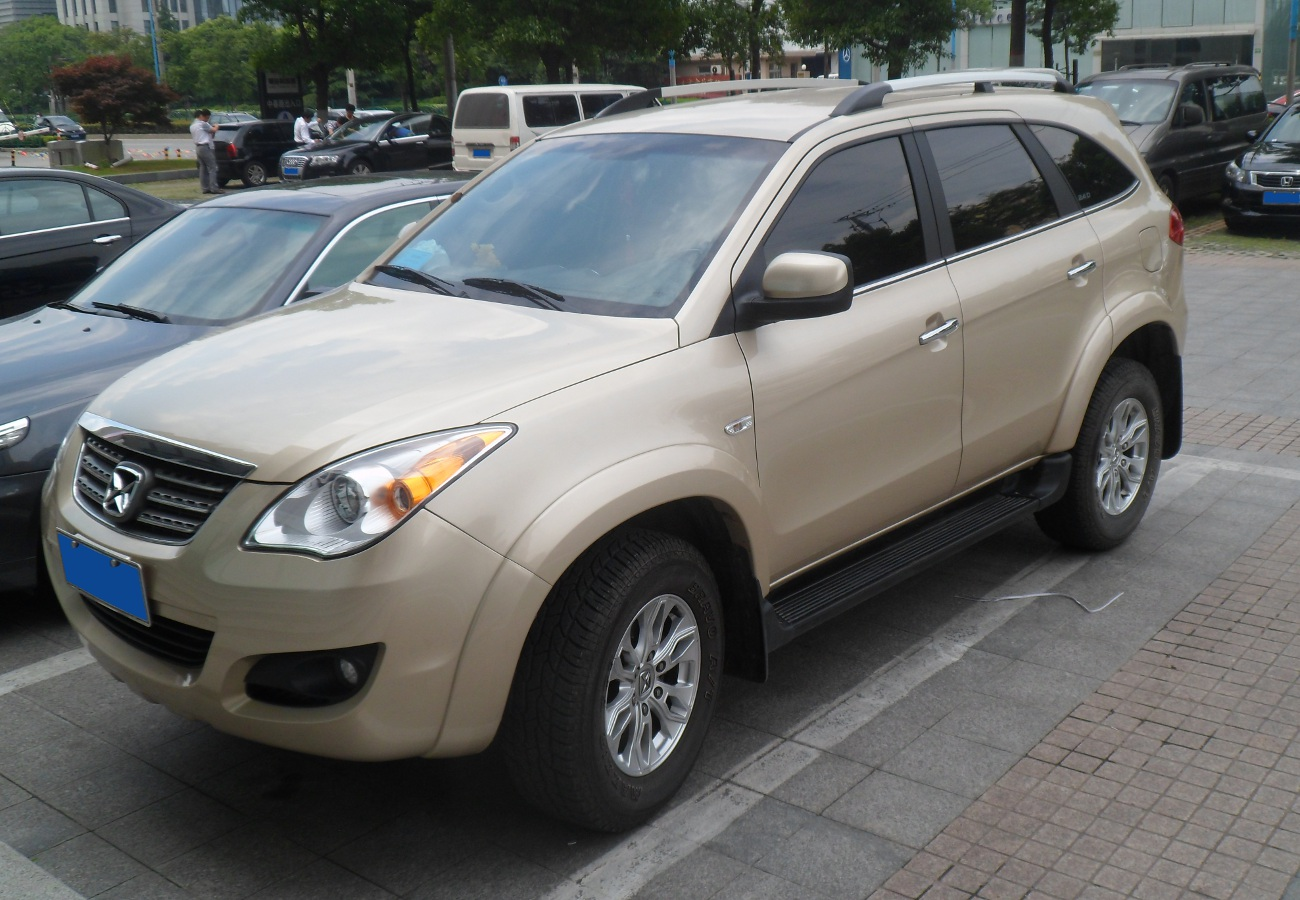
JMC S350
2012–present
- Effa-JMC 2.8 Turbo Intercooler N601 (2012–present, 3-Tonner)
- Effa-JMC 2.8 Turbo Intercooler N900 (2012–present, 4-Tonner)
- JMC N350 (2012–present)

=== Current Effa-Lifan ===
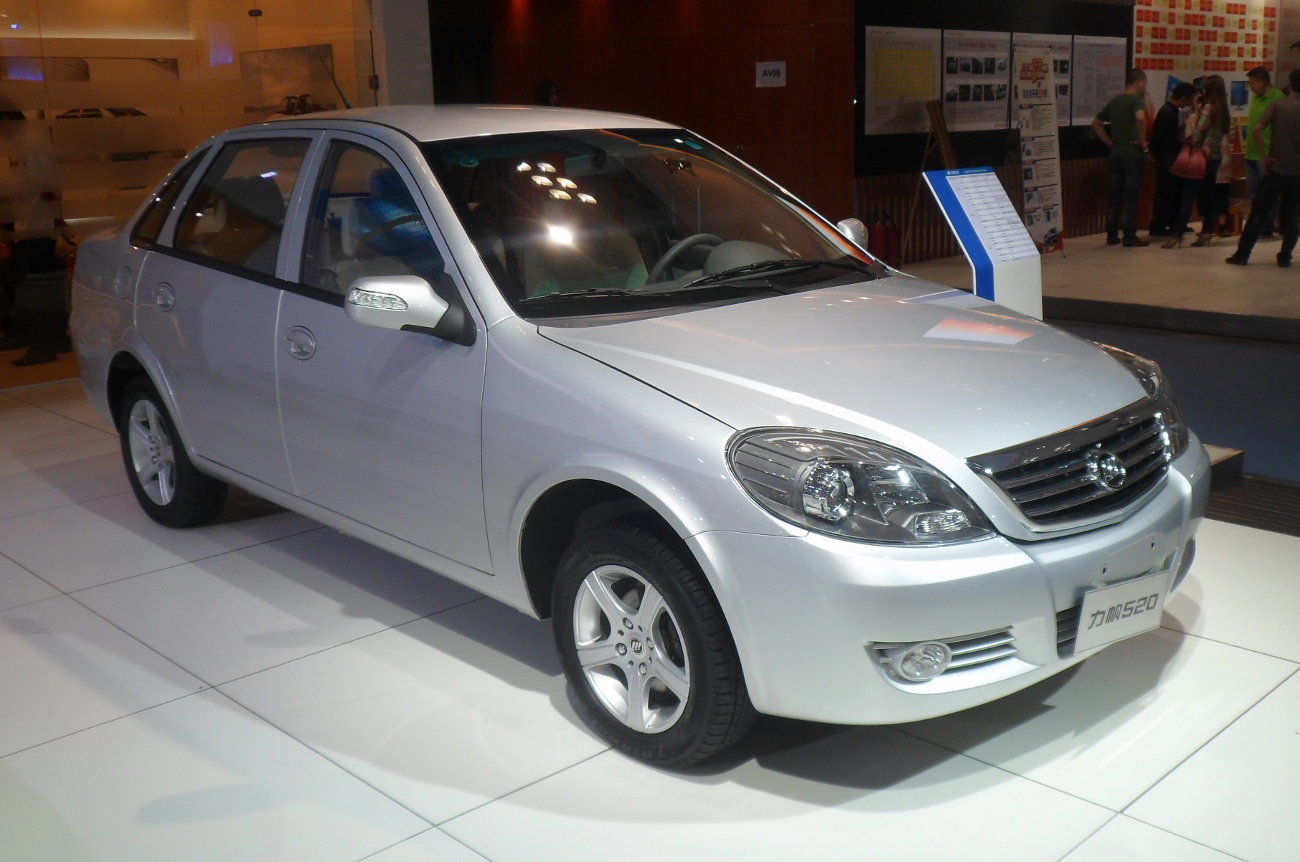
Lifan 520 Sedan
2010–present

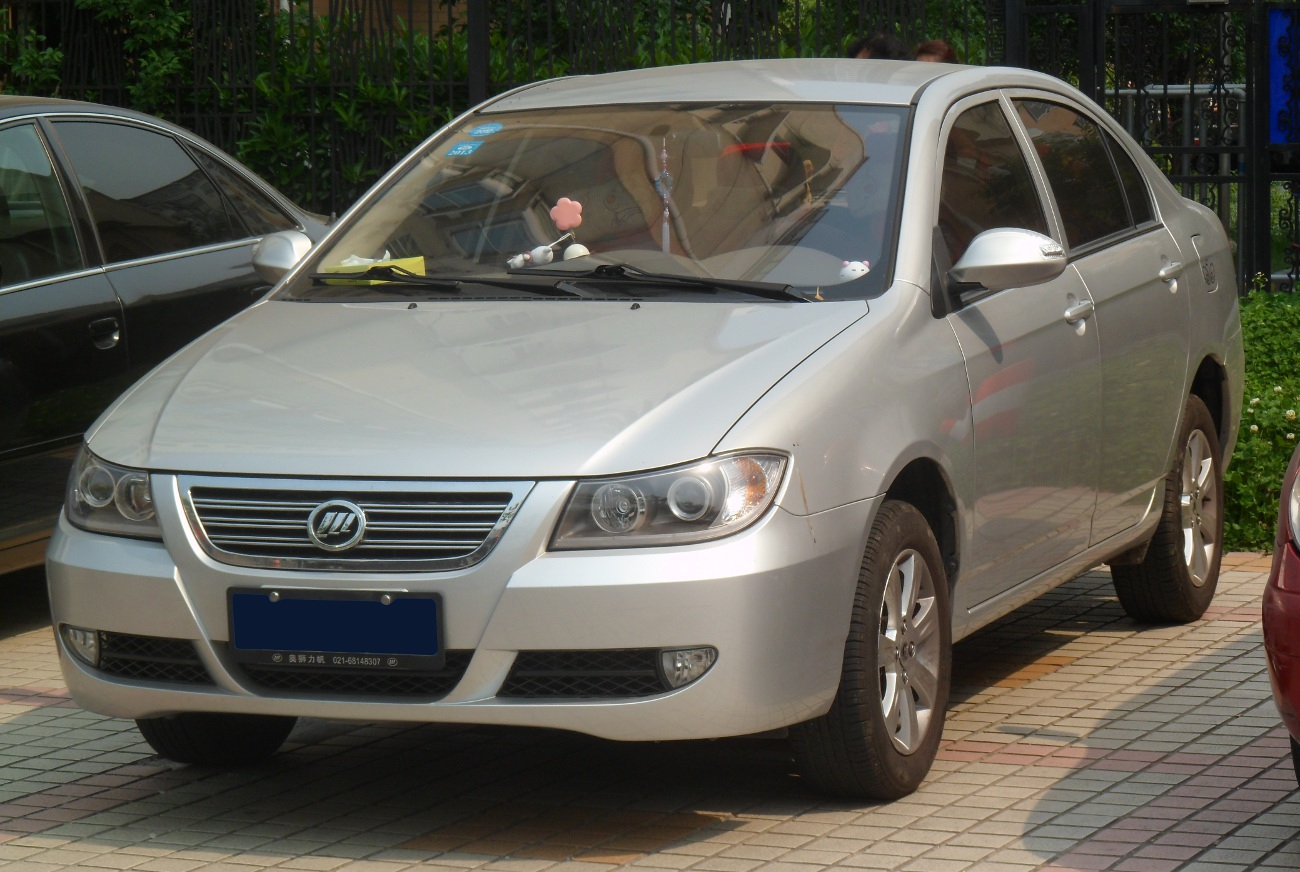
Lifan 620
2010–present

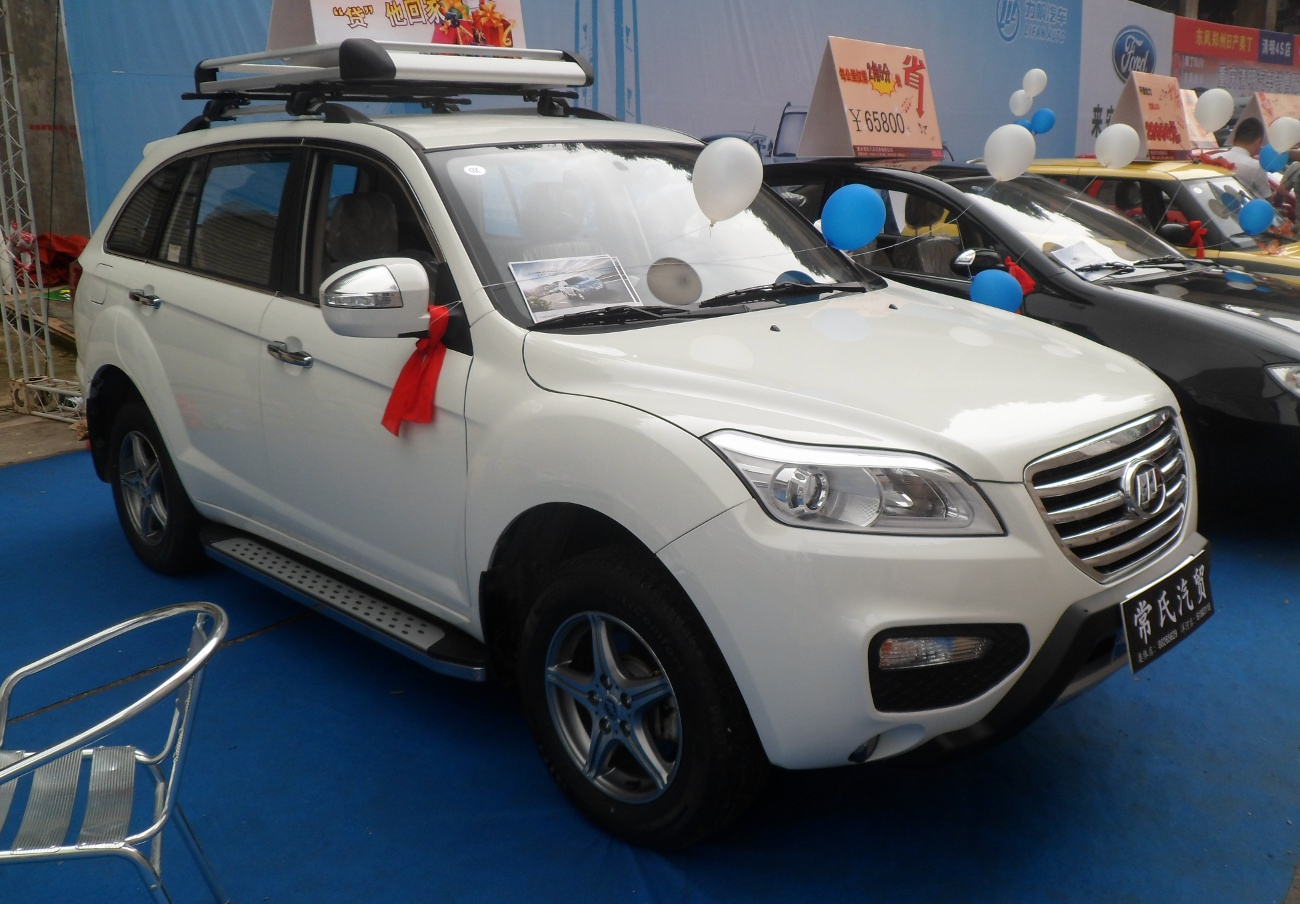
Lifan X60
2012–present

=== Former Effa-Lifan ===
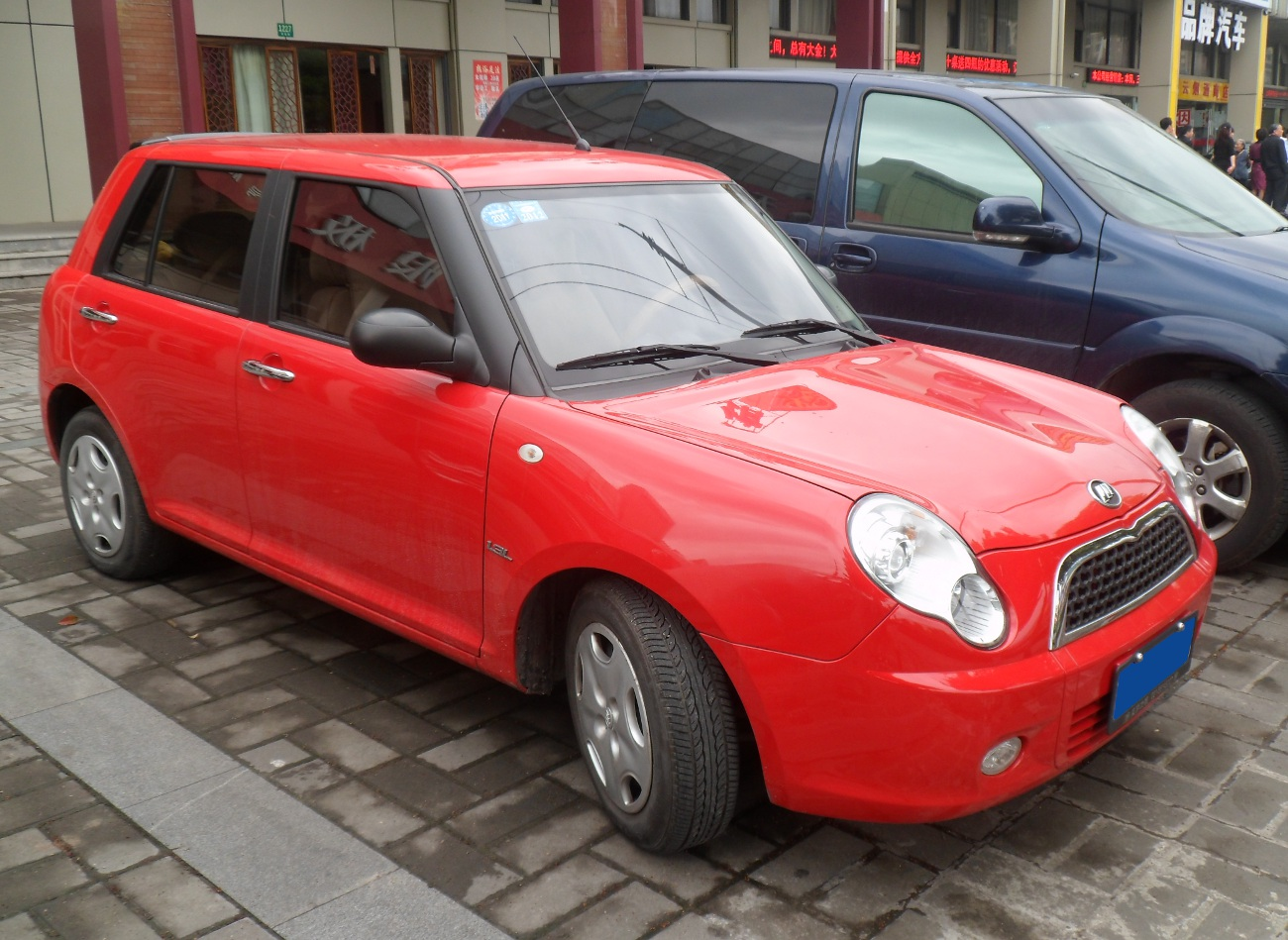
Lifan 320
2010-2012

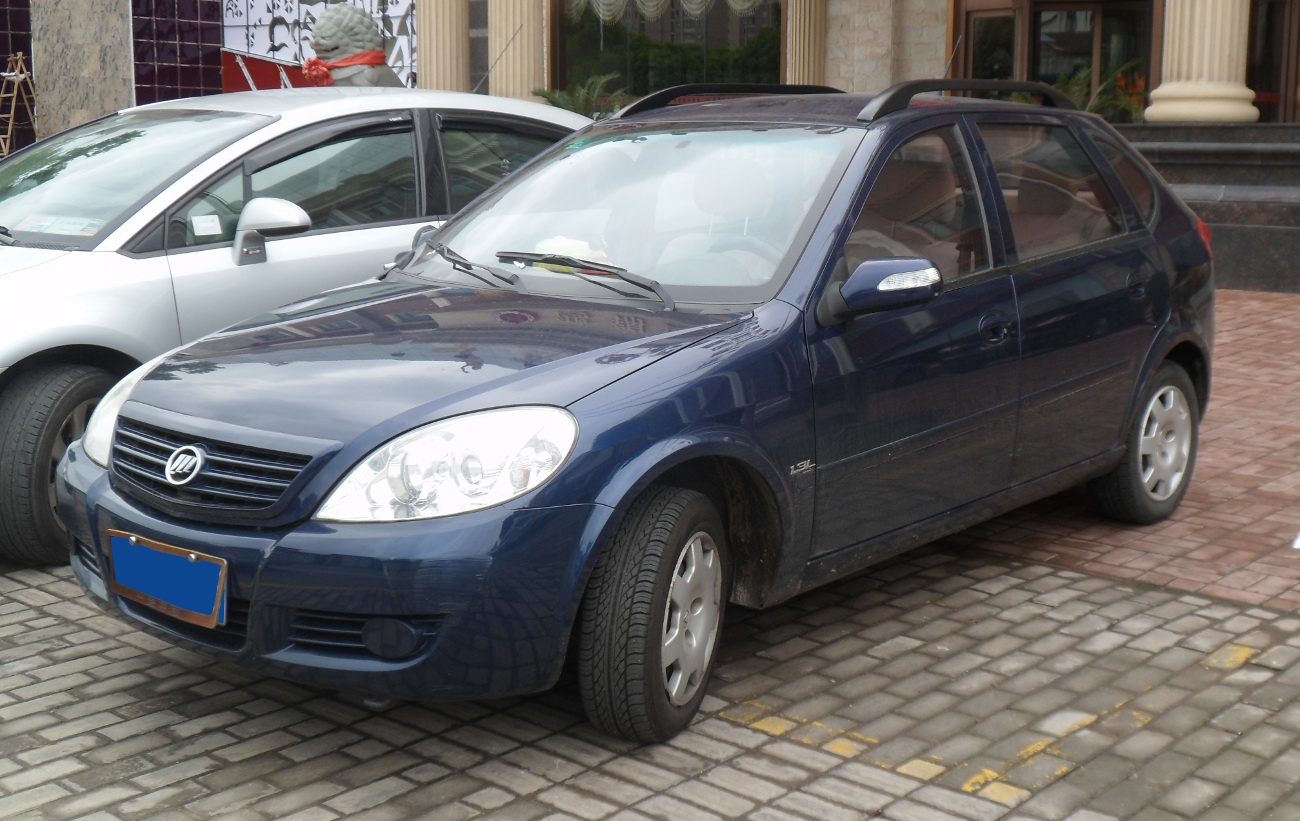
Lifan 520
2010-2012

=== Effa-Sinotruk ===
- Sinotruk Howa 6x2 tractor
- Sinotruk Howa 6x2 Cargo

== See also ==
- Sevel#Sevel Uruguay S.A.
