= Hafei Xiaobawang =

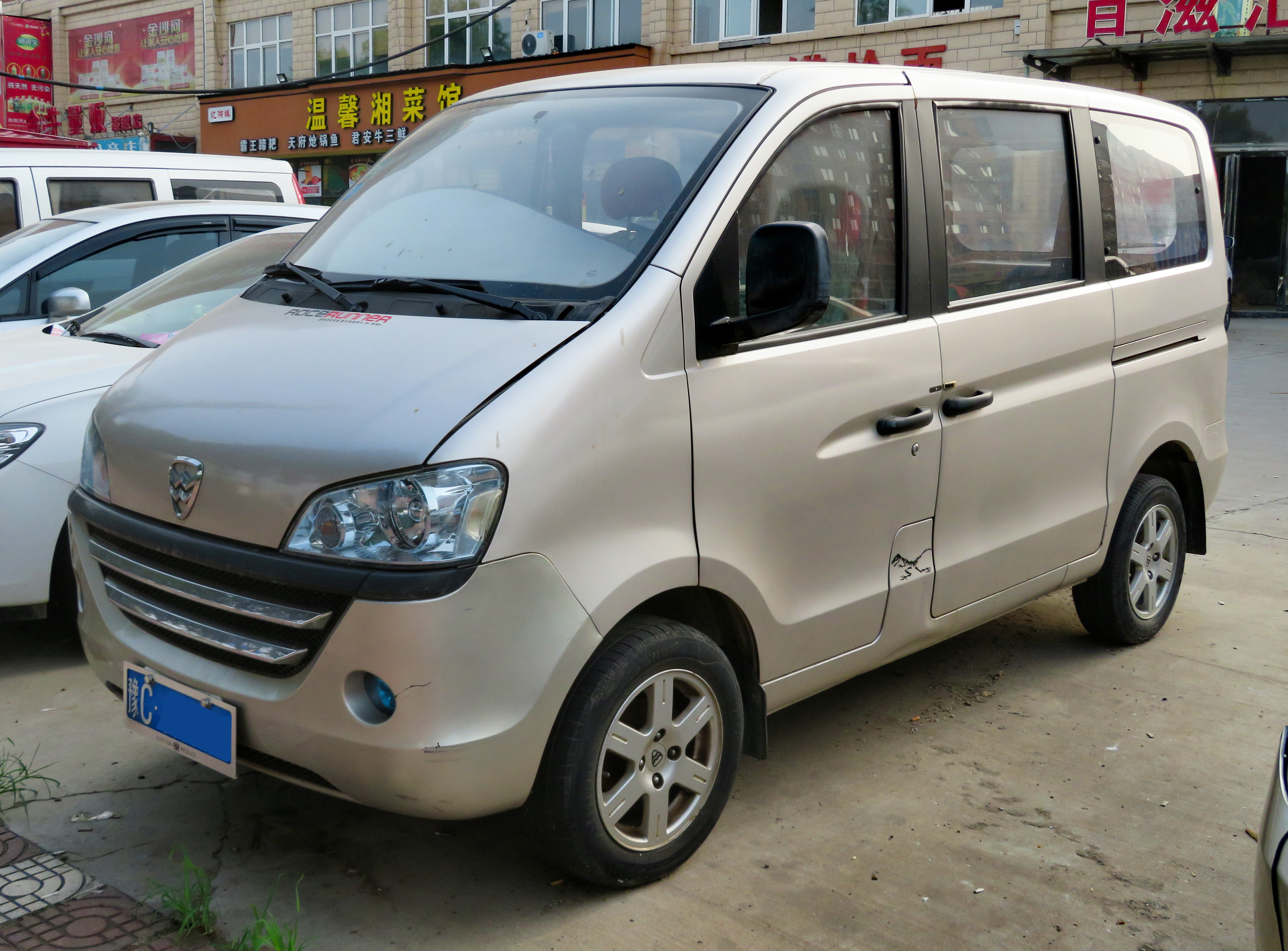

Overview
- Manufacturer: Hafei
- Also called: Hafei Luzun-Xiaobawang; Hafei Minyi Cargo
- Production: 2008–2018
- Assembly: Pingfang, Harbin, People's Republic of China

Body and chassis
- Class: Microvan
- Body style: 4-door minivan
- Layout: FMR layout
- Related: Hafei Minyi; CMC Veryca

Powertrain
- Engine: 1.0L DA465QA I4; 1.0L DA465QA-1A I4
- Transmission: 5-speed manual

Dimensions
- Wheelbase: 2,470 mm (97.2 in)
- Length: 3,948 mm (155.4 in)
- Width: 1,525 mm (60.0 in)
- Height: 1,855 mm (73.0 in)

The Hafei Xiaobawang (小霸王) or Hafei Luzun-Xiaobawang (路尊小霸王) is a microvan by Hafei positioned above the slightly smaller Hafei Minyi.

== Overview ==
The Hafei Xiaobawang (Small Conqueror) was launched in 2008 during the 2008 Beijing Auto Show. The Xiaobawang was built on the same platform and features the exact same powertrain as the Hafei Minyi microvan, and was launched as a more upmarket option to the Minyi microvan. In several markets, the Hafei Xiaobawang was also sold as the Hafei Minyi. There are two versions of the engine for the Xiaobawang, producing 48hp and 60 hp respectively. The more powerful 1.0 liter engine produces 60 hp (44kW)/5500rpm and 84Nm/3000-4000rpm. The only transmission is a 5-speed manual gearbox. The top speed of the Xiaobawang is 110 km/h.

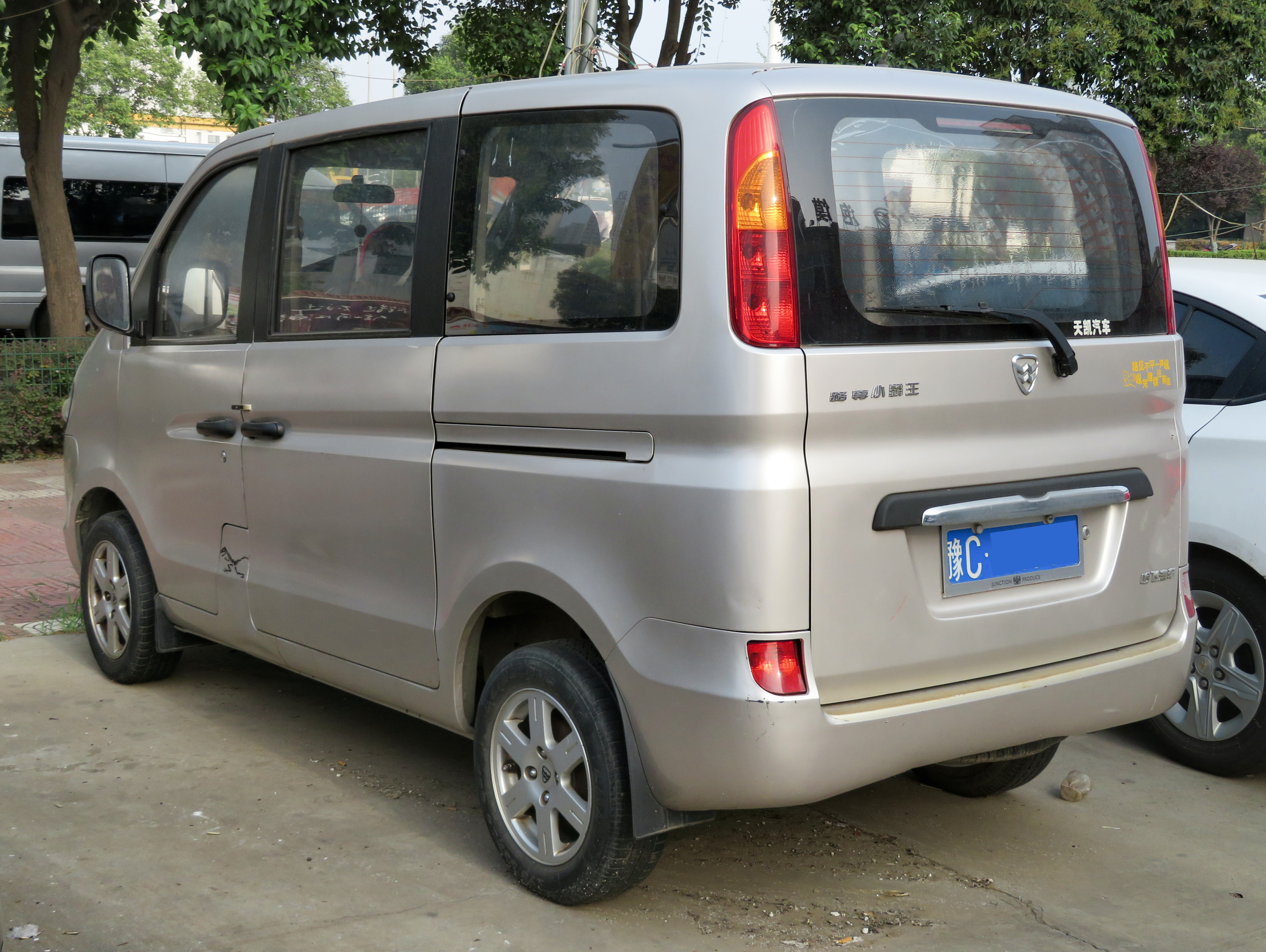
Hafei Luzun-Xiaobawang, rear

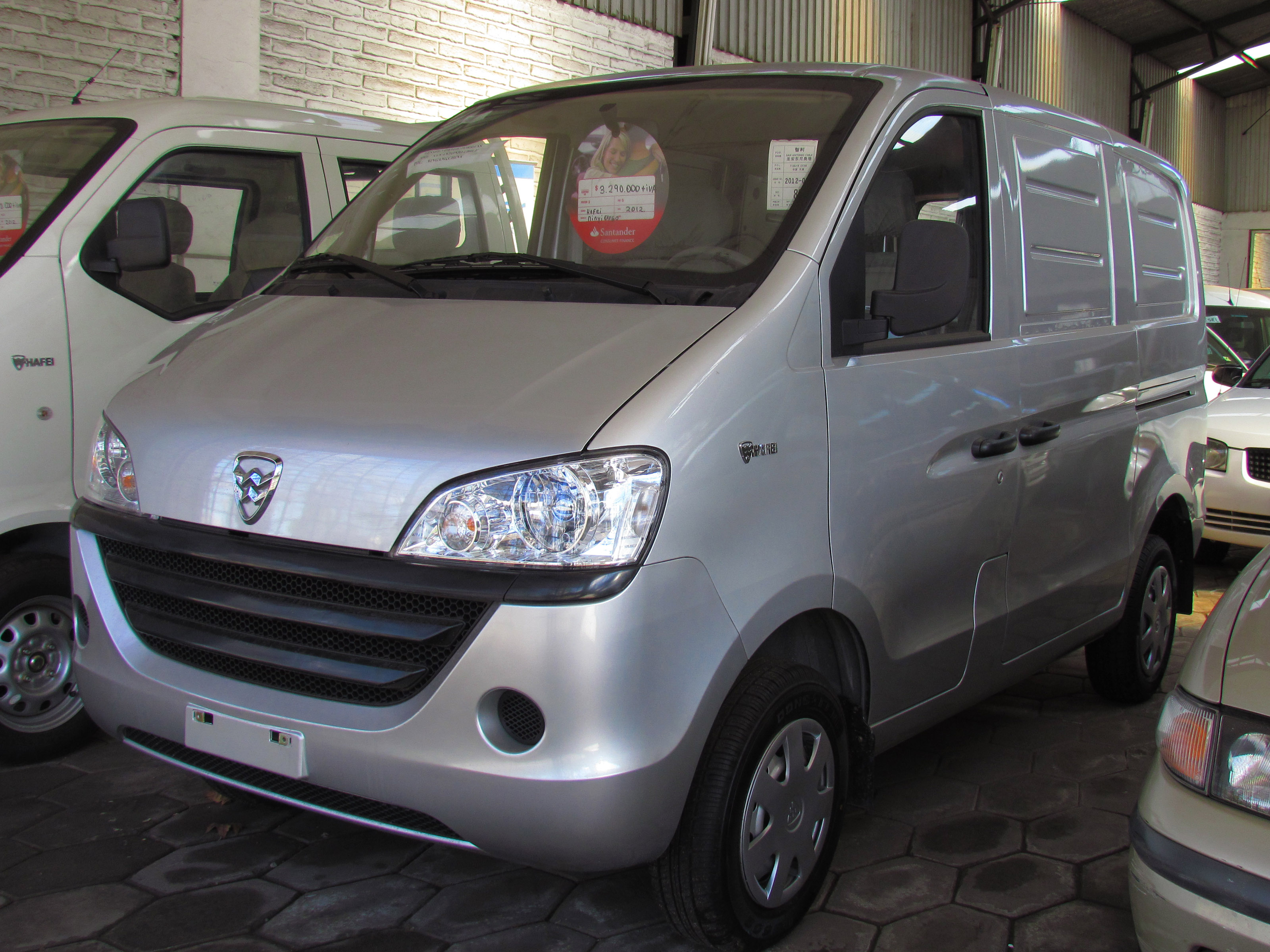
Panel van

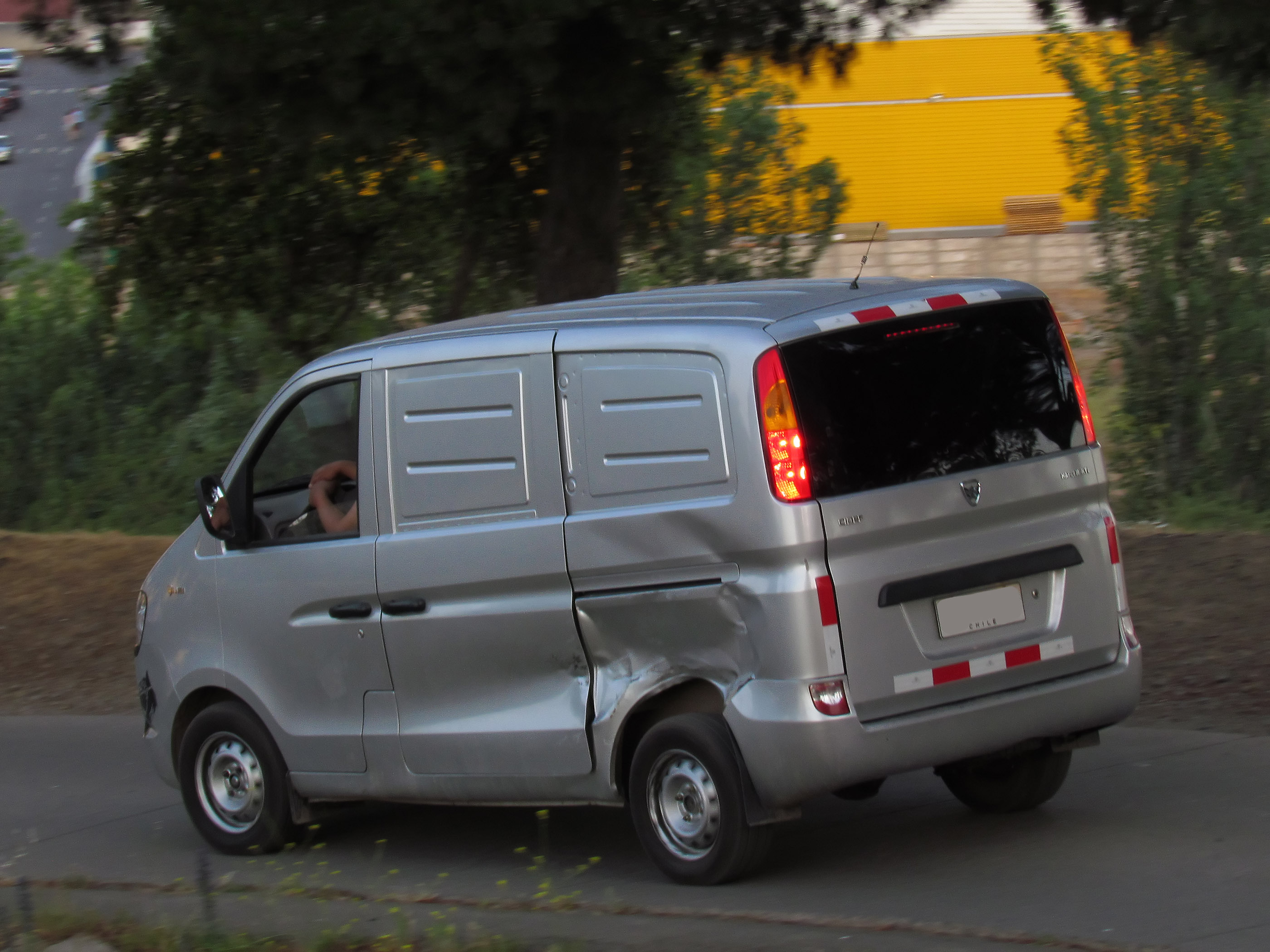
Panel van (rear)
