= Hafei =

Chinese car manufacturer

Hafei Motor Co., Ltd. 哈飞汽车
- Type: Subsidiary
- Industry: Automotive
- Founded: 1980; 46 years ago
- Defunct: 2018; 8 years ago
- Fate: Merged into Changan Ford (passenger cars) and Changan Kaicene (light commercial vehicles)
- Headquarters: Harbin, Heilongjiang, China
- Products: Motor vehicles
- Parent: Changan Automobile

Hafei, officially Hafei Motor Co., Ltd. (Chinese: 哈飞汽车), is a Chinese automaker currently operating as a subsidiary of Changan Automobile, and which manufactures passenger vehicles.

It previously independently manufactured sedans, MPVs, mini vehicles, small trucks, and vans for commercial use.

== History ==
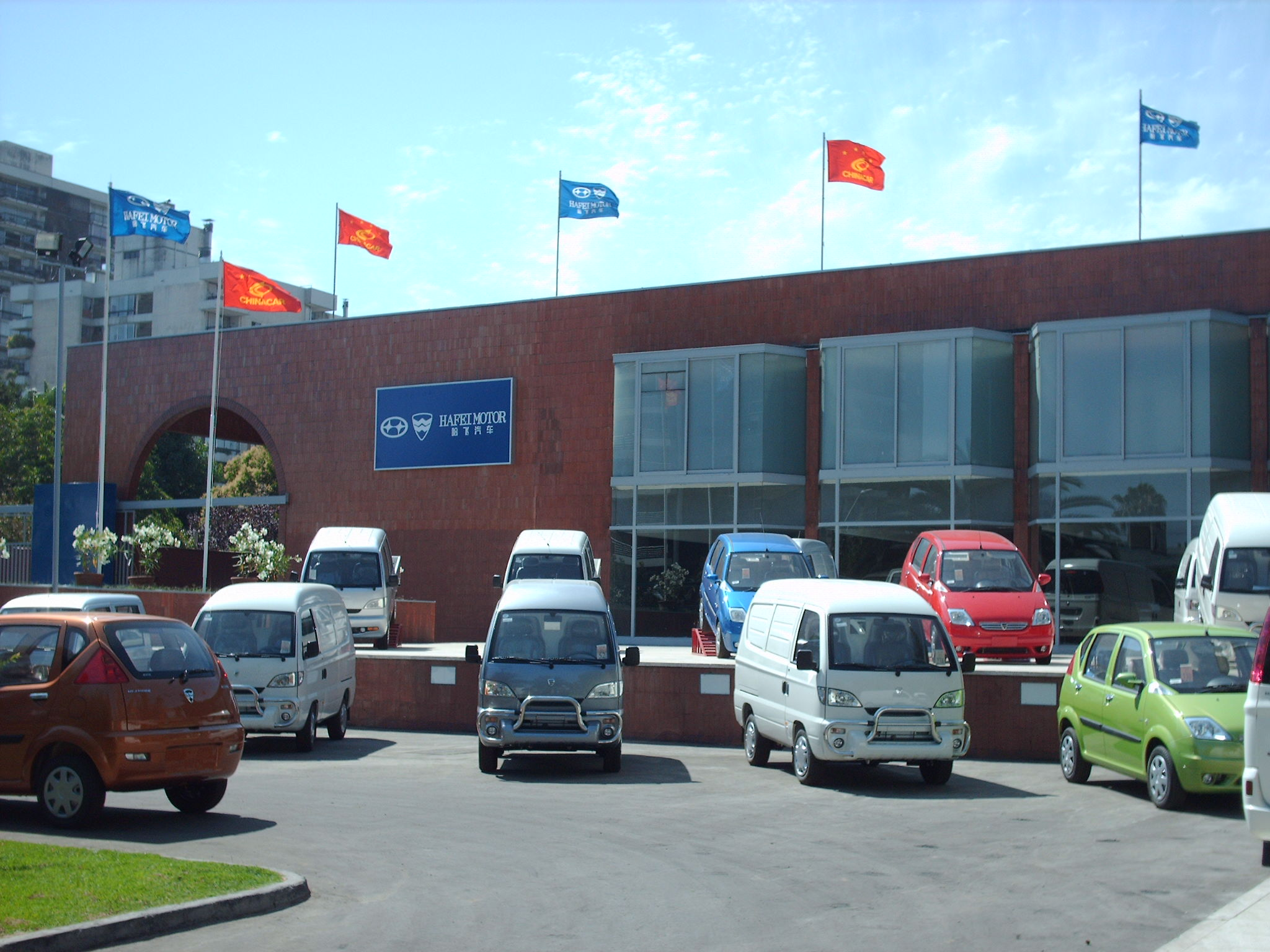
Hafei centre in Chile

Hafei was formerly owned by Aviation Industry Corporation of China. The earliest Hafei products were Suzuki Carry-based microvans and trucks sold under the Songhuajiang brand, named after the Songhua River, but by 2002 they were sold directly under the Hafei brand. Their vehicles have always carried the "HFJ" identity code, no matter the brand.

As of 2009, the company had exported products to a total of 40 nations.

In 2009, the Chang'an Automobile Group purchased most Hafei-related assets prompted by a Chinese State policy aimed at consolidating the domestic automobile manufacturing industry.

In 2015, Changan announced it would discontinue all Hafei production and convert existing lines to serve Changan Ford for passenger cars production and Changan Kaicene for light commercial vehicles production.

== Production bases ==
Hafei has production facilities in Northern China.

== Historical Models ==
Hafei produced small cars and MPVs in addition to small trucks and commercial vans. These so-called mini vehicles made up the majority of the Hafei model line. Many Hafei consumer offerings were designed by Pininfarina.

=== Model list ===
- Baili, a small city car
- Lobo, a small city car, Pininfarina-designed
- Zhongyi, Pininfarina-designed
- Zhongyi V5, a microvan based on the Chana Star 5
- Junyi, a microvan based on the Chana Star S460, first new product after its acquisition by Chang'an.
- Ruiyi, a mini pickup based on the Hafei Zhongyi
- Minyi, (Xinminyi/Luzun-Xiaobawang) a microvan and pickup
- Luzun-Dabawang, a microvan
- Xiaobawang, a microvan
- Saibao III, Pininfarina-designed compact sedan
  - The Coda Sedan electric car from Coda Automotive used the Saibao III body with different front and rear fascias. This variant may have been available in parts of China c. 2013.
- Saibao V, Pininfarina-designed compact to midsize sedan
- Saima, a license built Mitsubishi Dingo is a small city car added to the Hafei product line in April 2001.
- Hafei Songhuajiang HFJ6350 (松花江), a license-built rebadged eighth generation Suzuki Carry, This model had wide popularity in China during the 1990s.
- Hafei Songhuajiang HFJ7080D/HFJ7130, a sedan rebadged from the Yulon Sunny 303. Assembling took place between 1992 and 1993 and was fitted with a 1.3 litre Mitsubishi engine.

=== Gallery ===
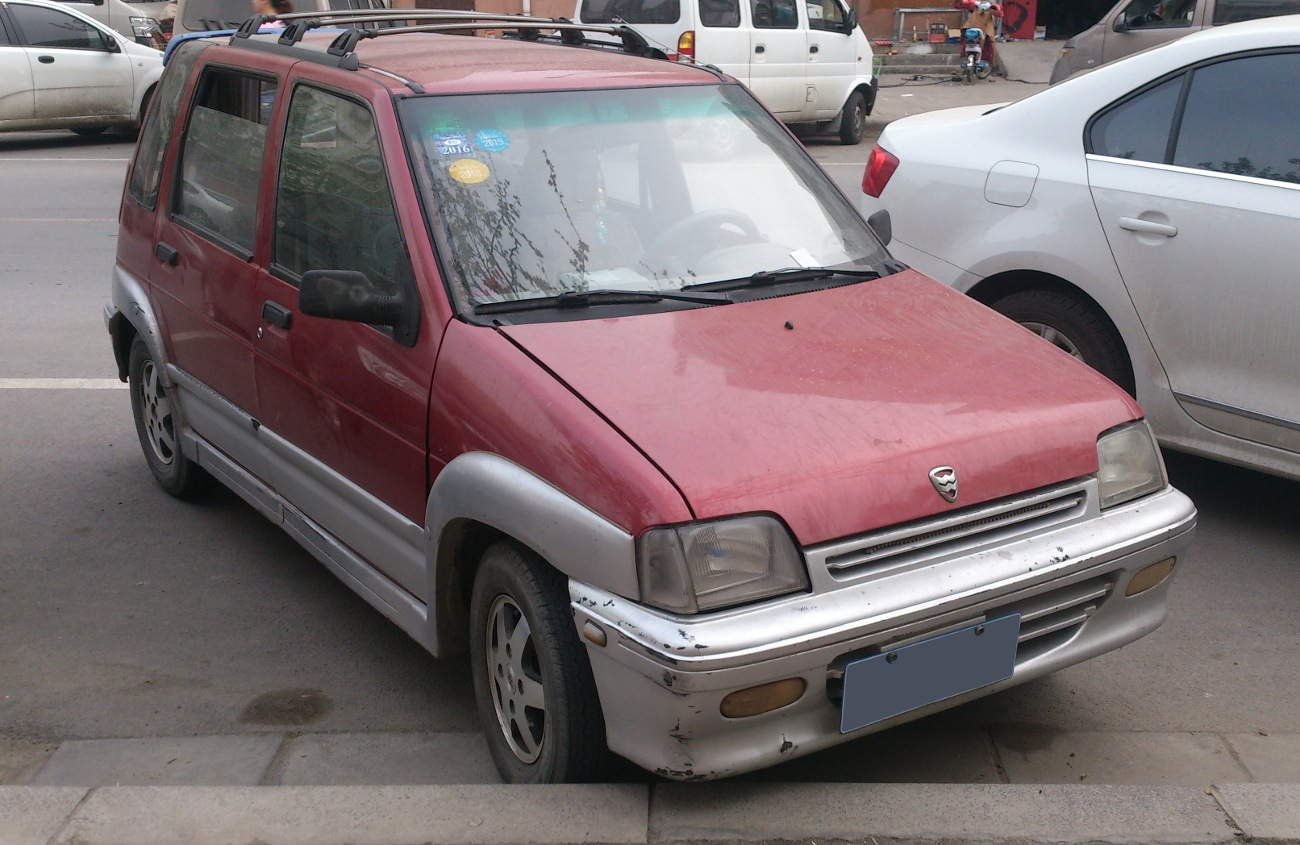
Hafei Baili

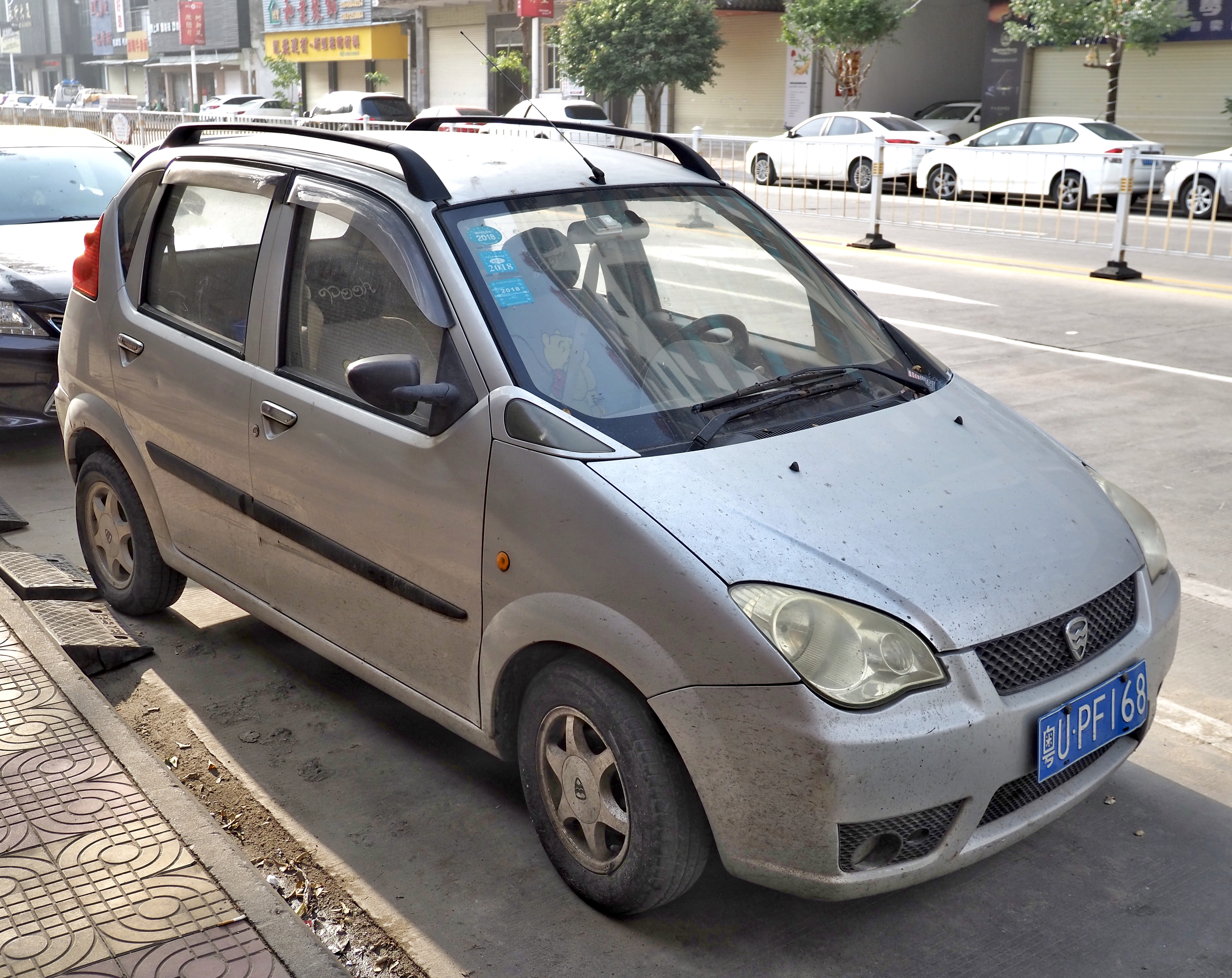
Hafei Lobo

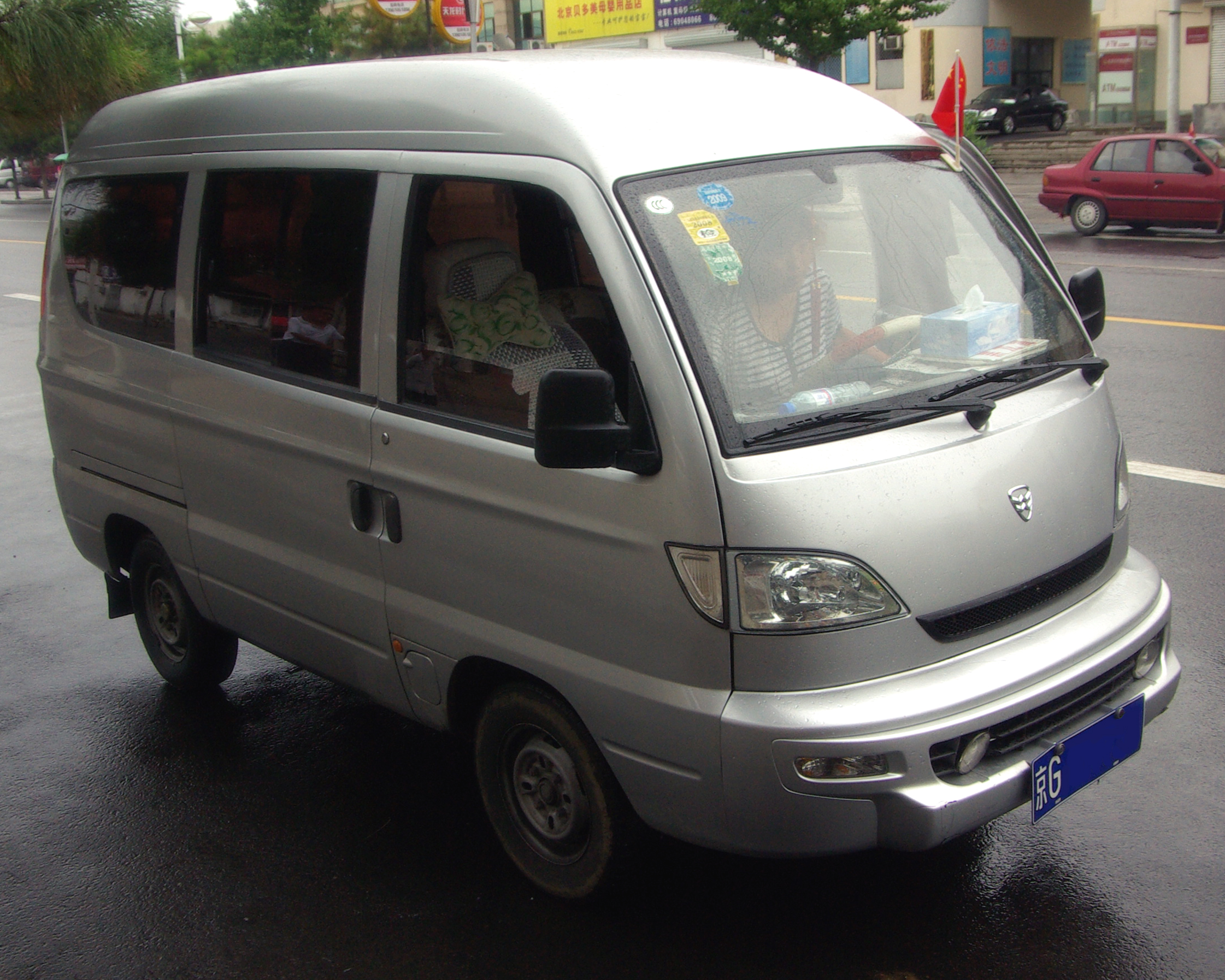
Hafei Zhongyi

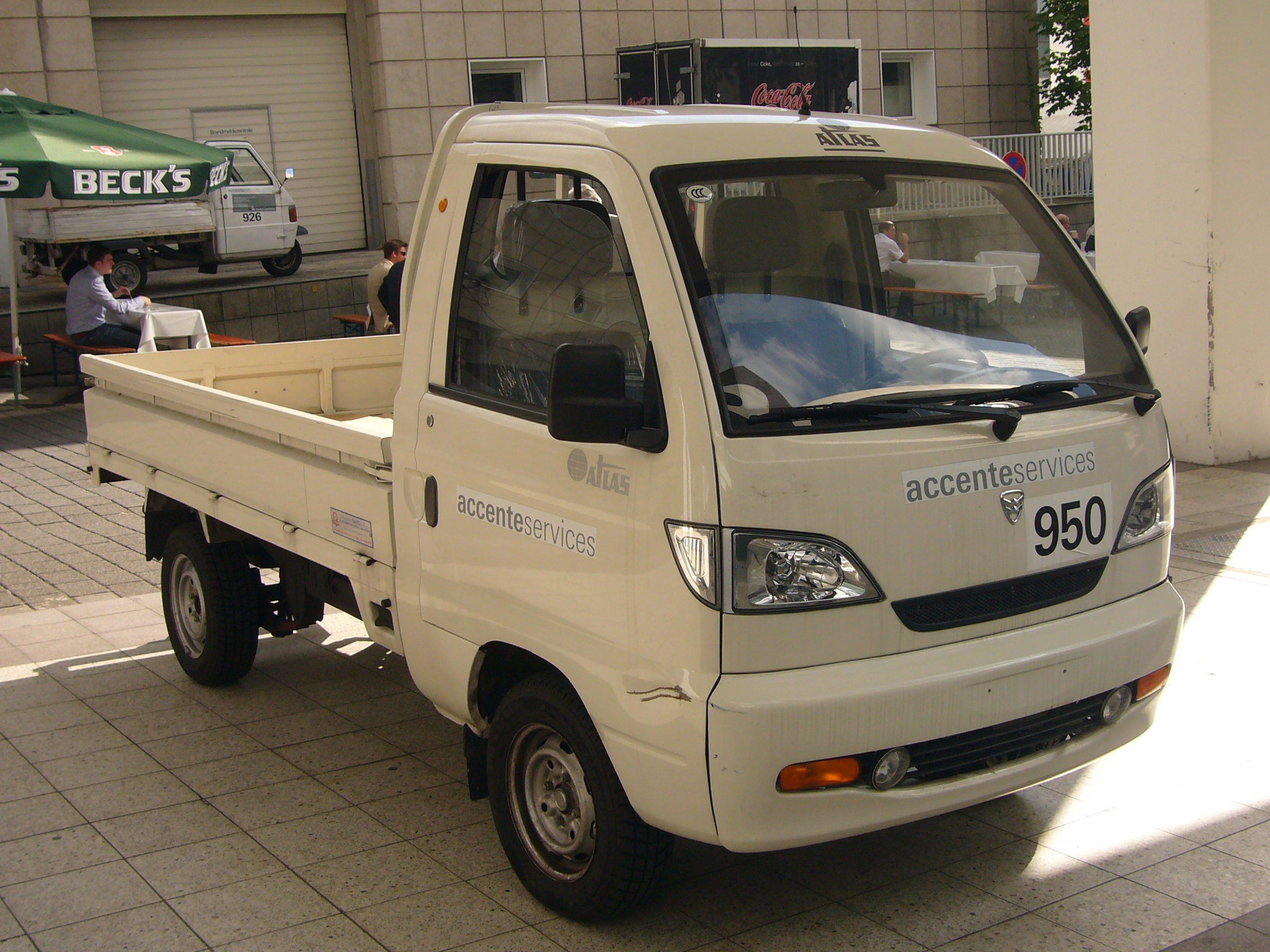
Hafei Ruiyi

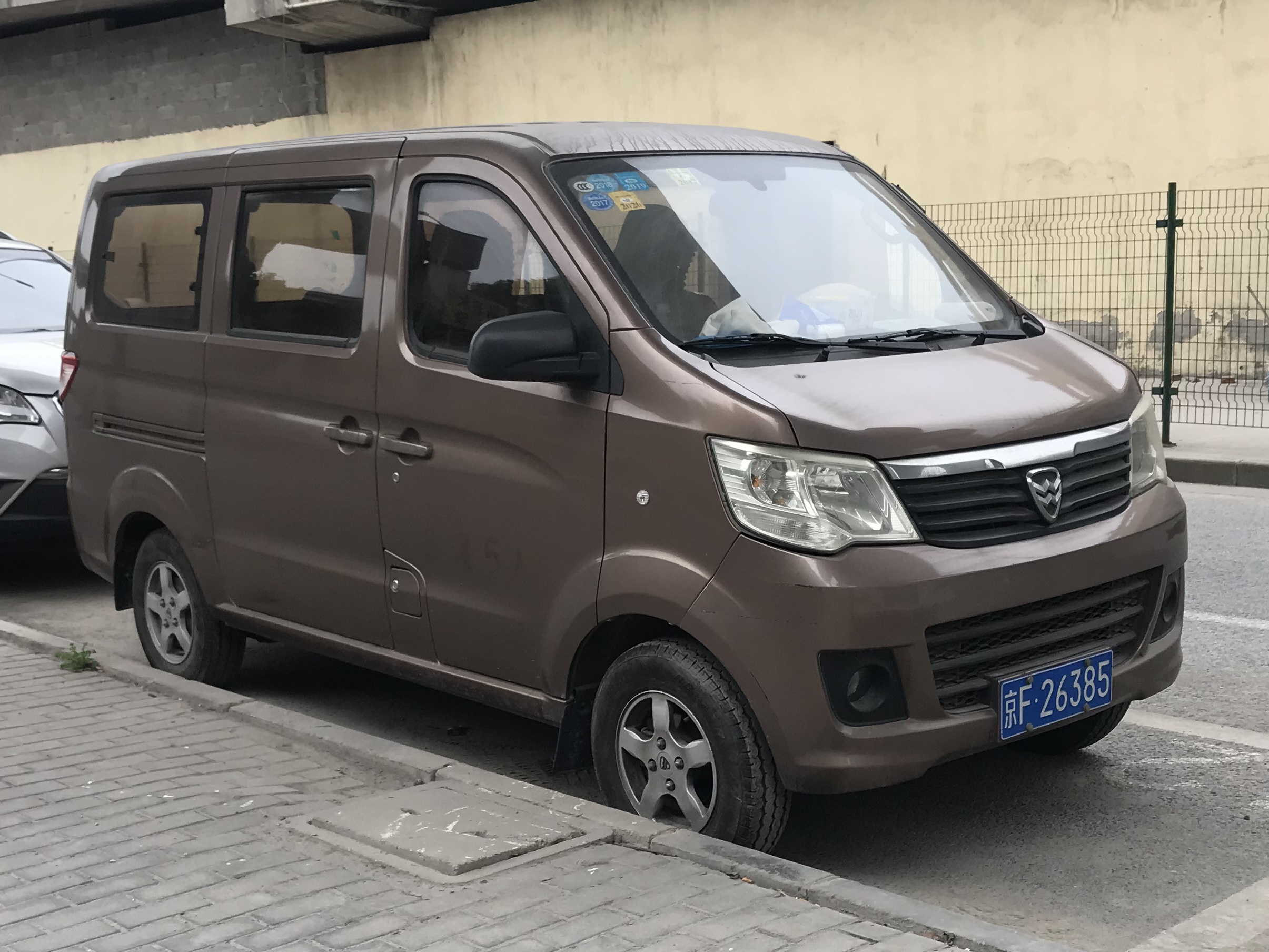
Hafei Zhongyi V5

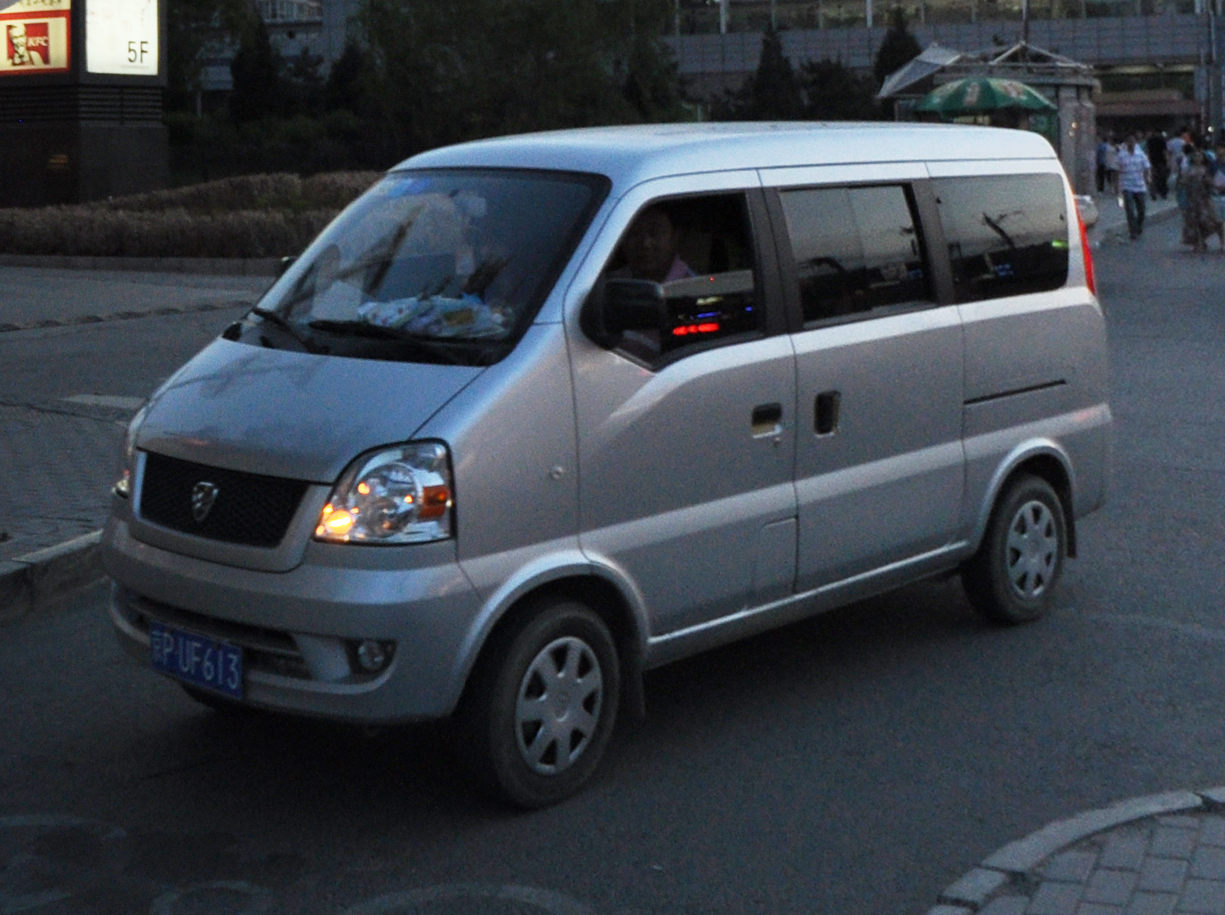
Hafei Minyi M408

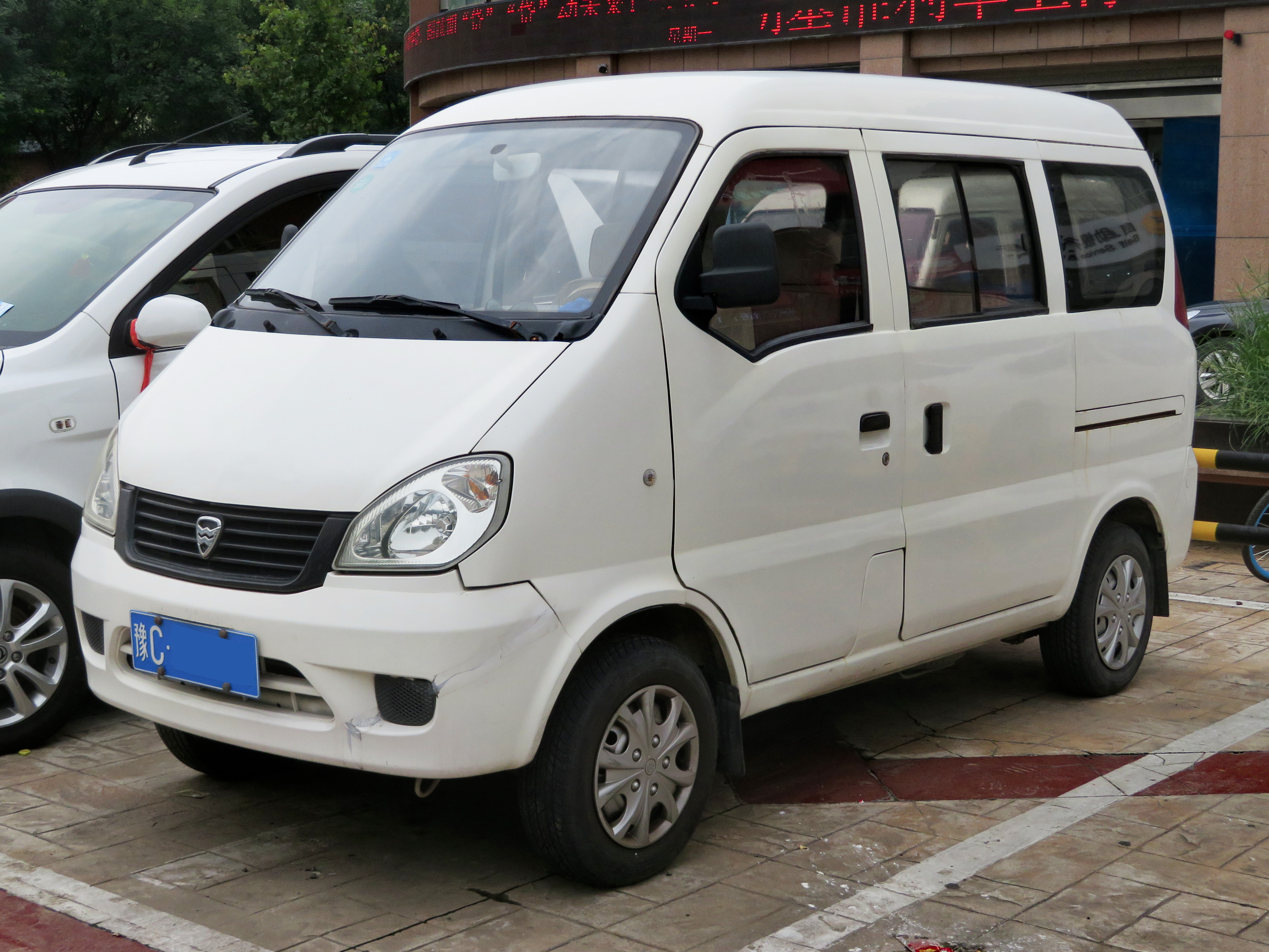
Hafei Minyi

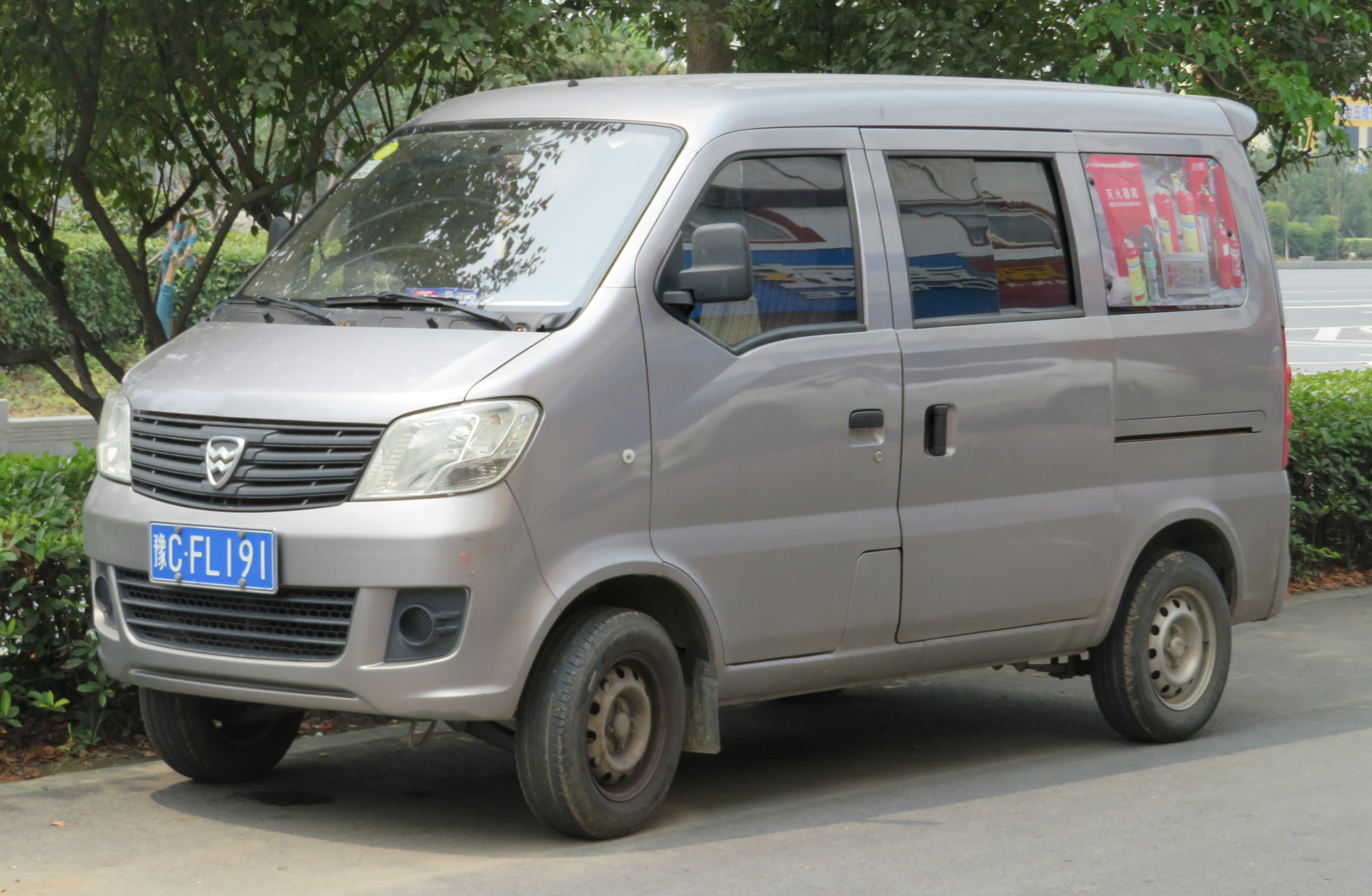
Hafei Xin-Minyi (Second generation Minyi)

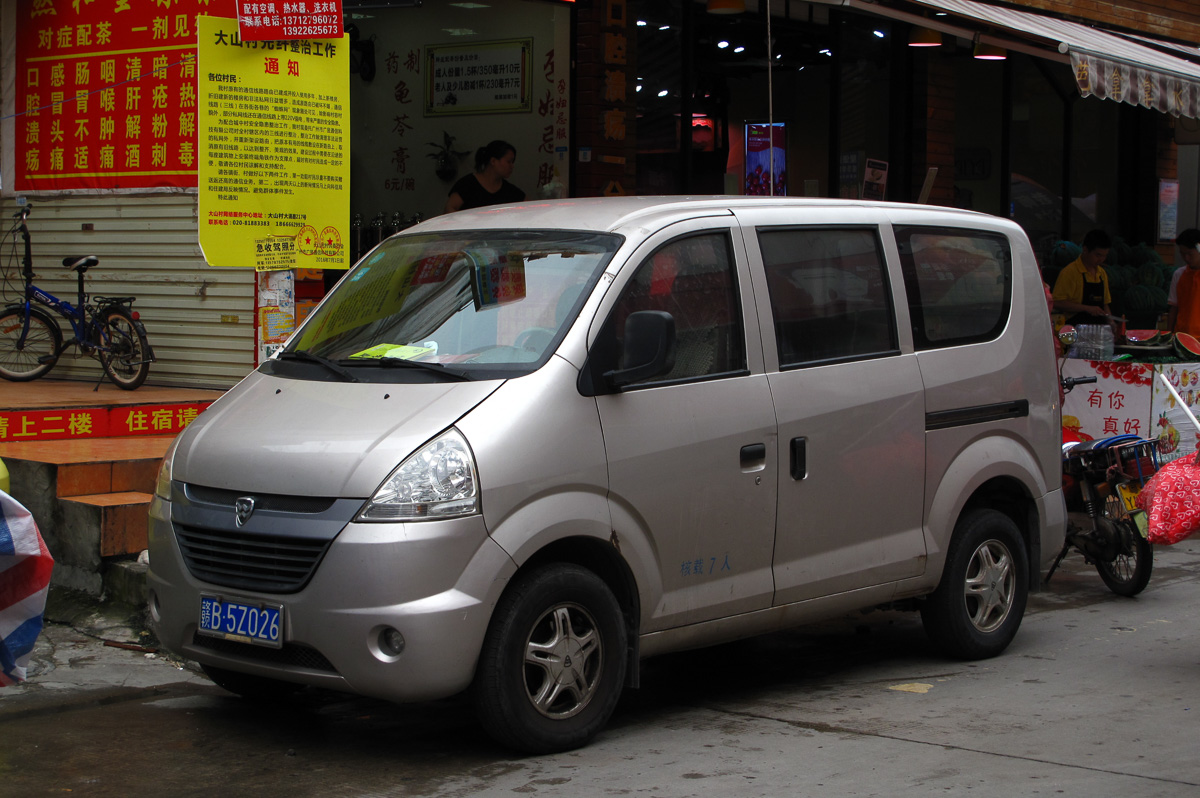
Hafei Dabawang (Luzun-Dabawang)

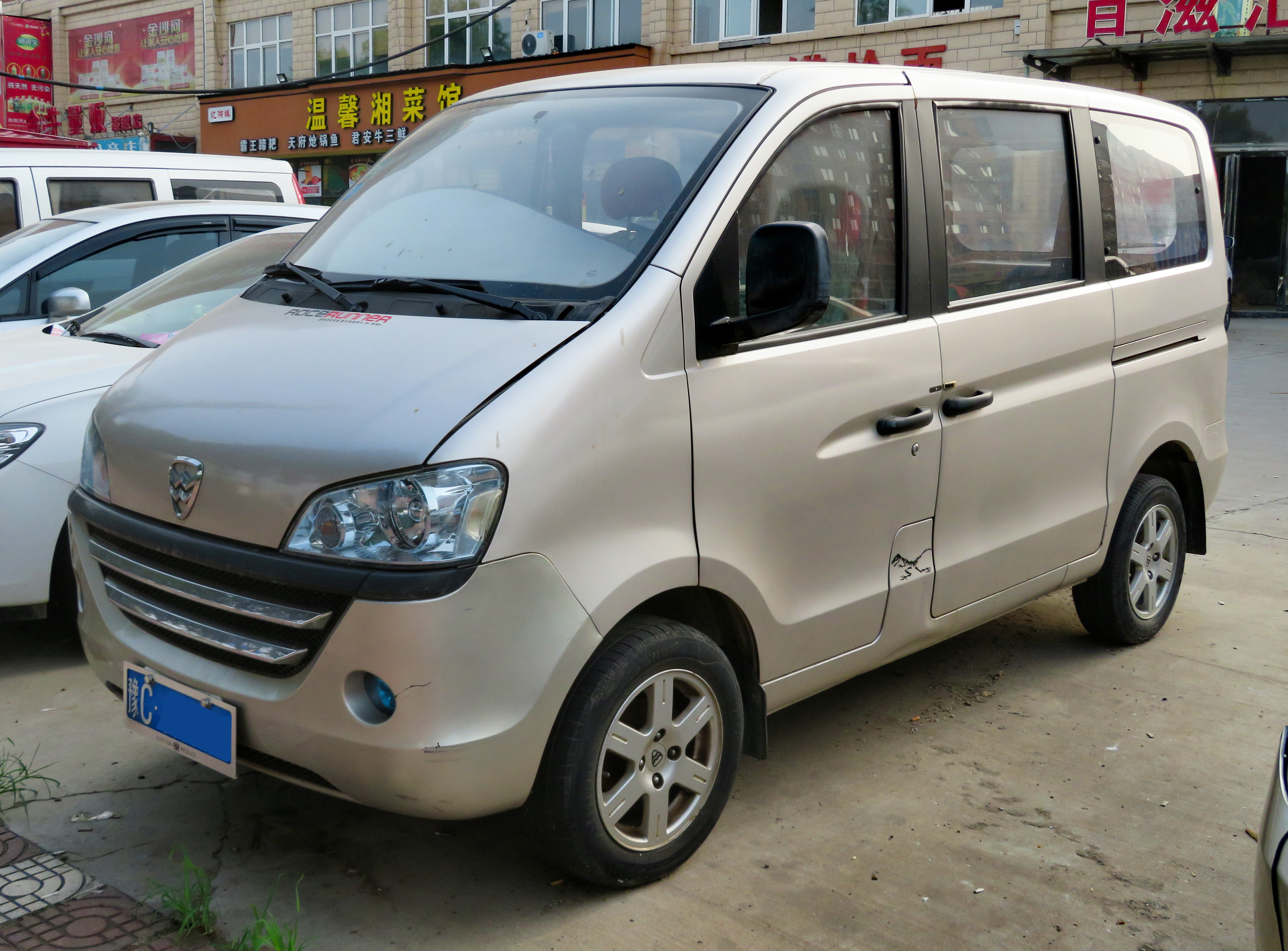
Hafei Xiaobawang (Luzun-Xiaobawang)

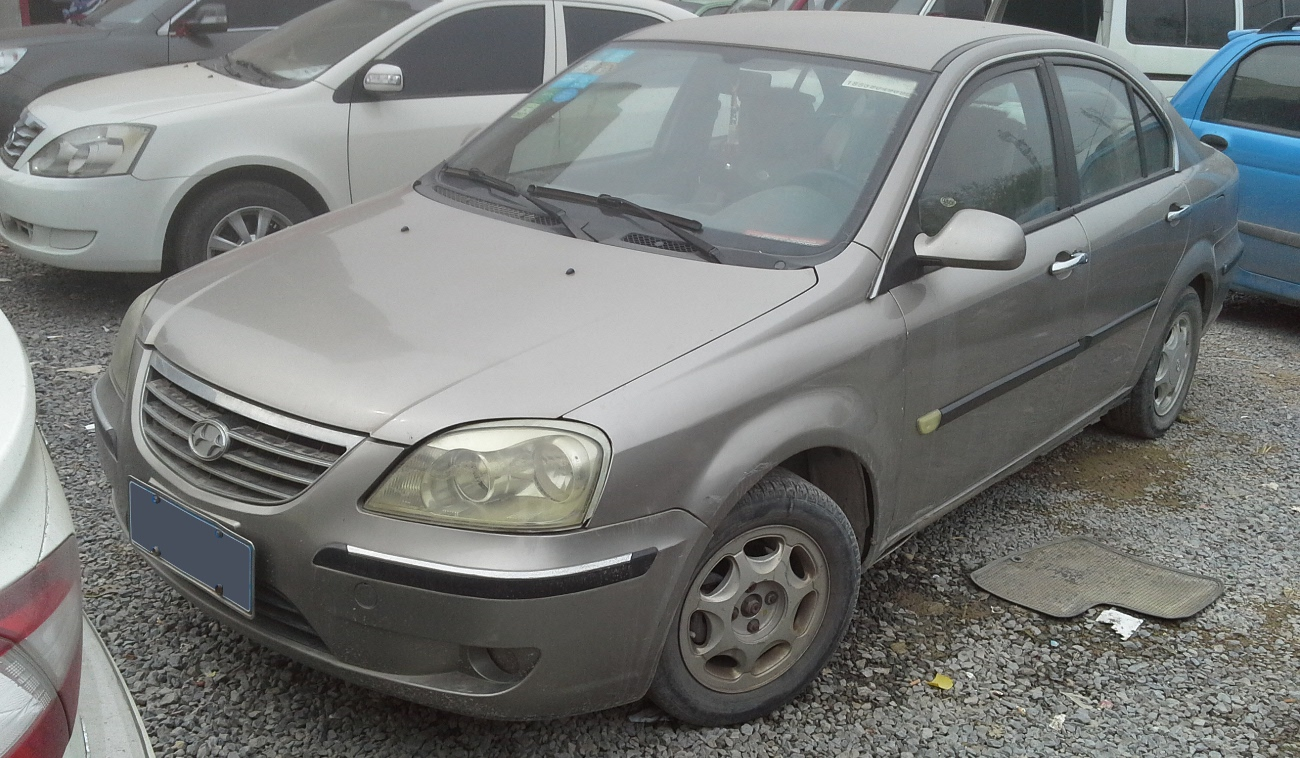
Hafei Saibao III

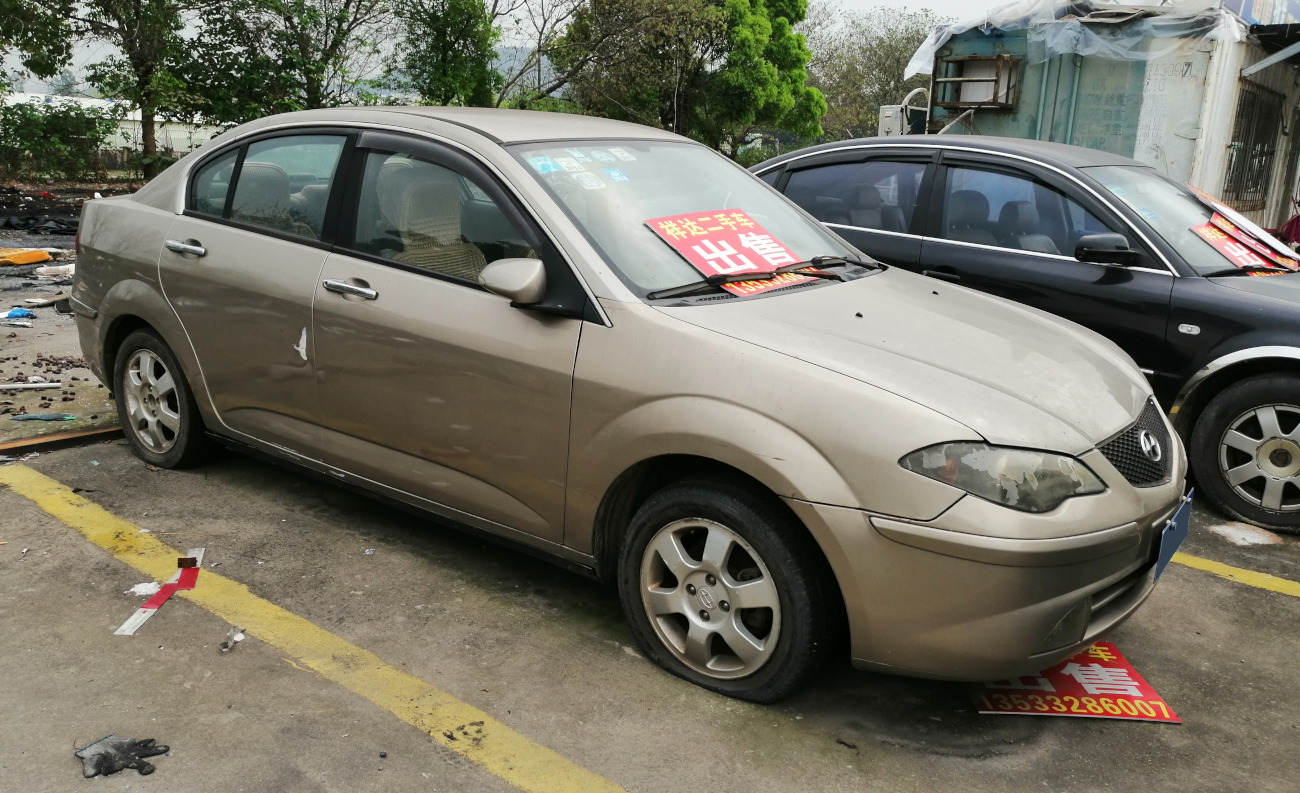
Hafei Saibao V

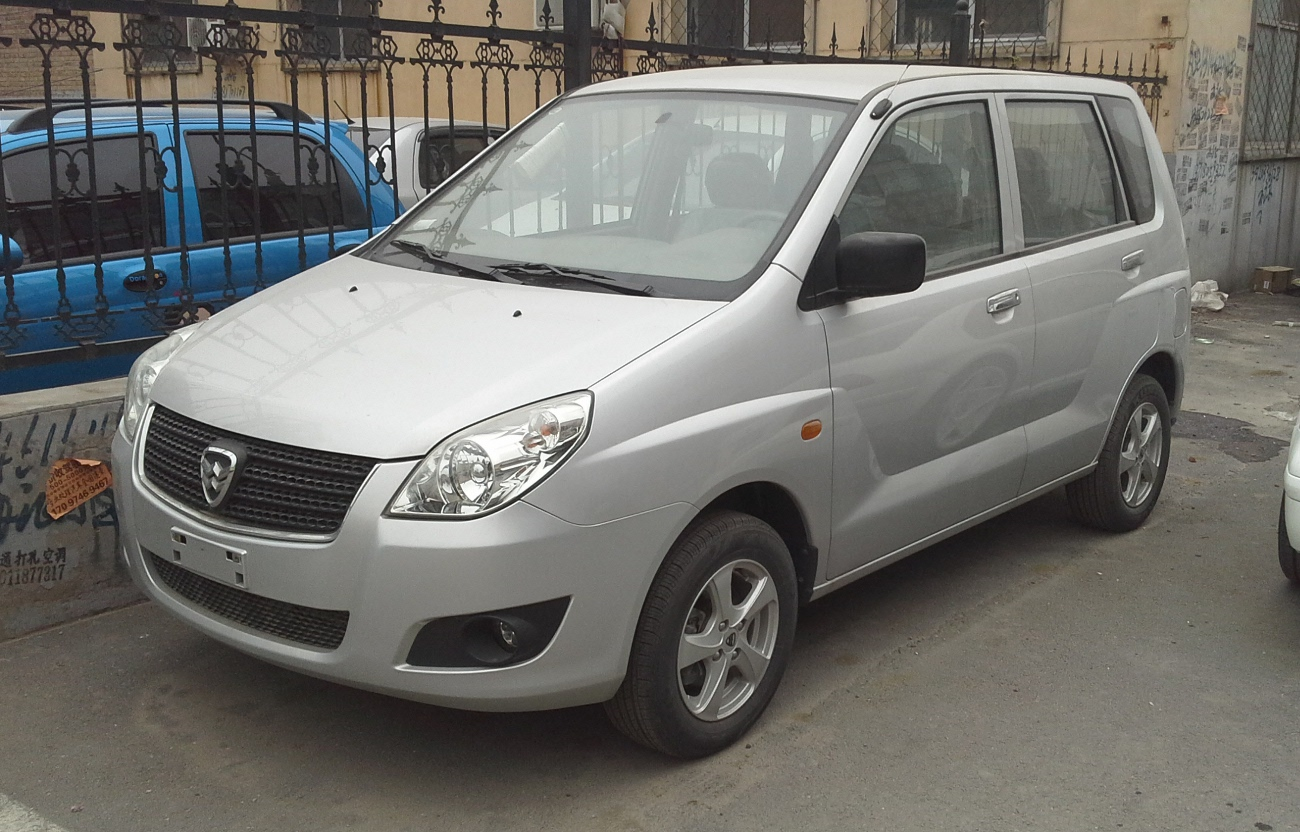
Hafei Saima facelift
