= Hafei Minyi =

Chinese microvan

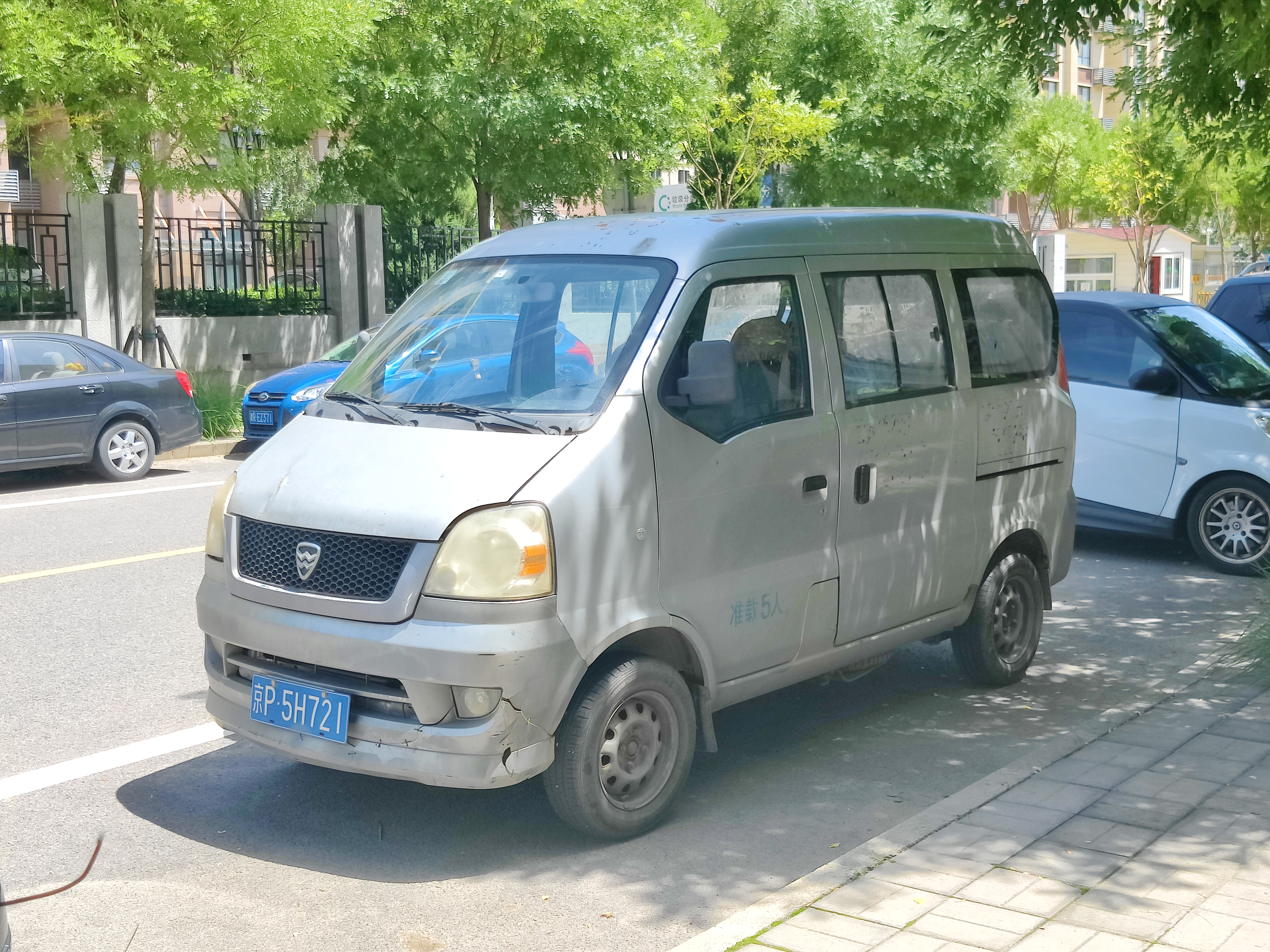

Overview
- Manufacturer: Hafei
- Production: 2003–2018

Body and chassis
- Class: Microvan
- Body style: Van

The Hafei Minyi is a seven- to eight-seater Microvan made by Hafei, a Chinese carmaker.

== First Generation ==
Hafei Minyi I
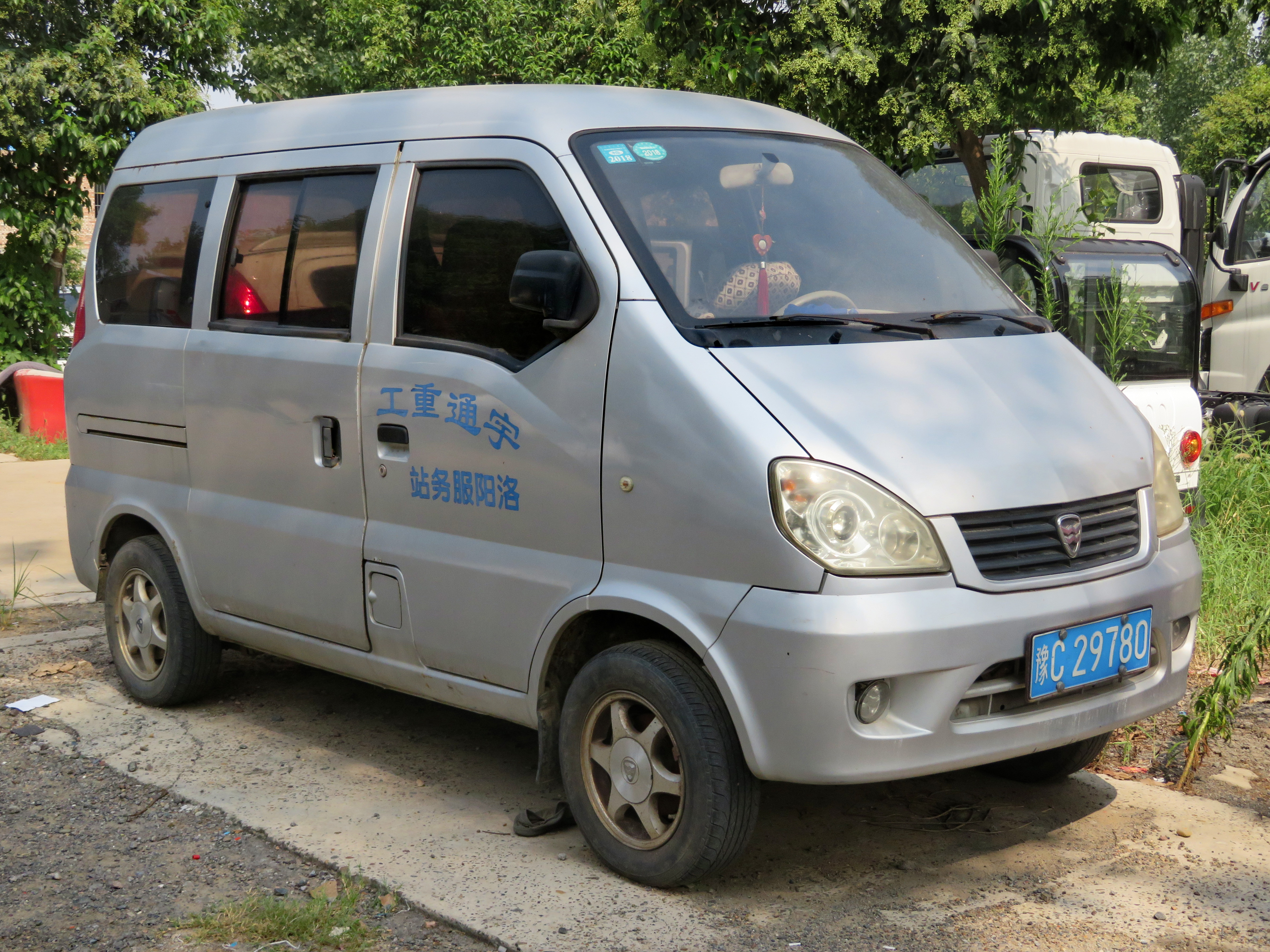

Overview
- Manufacturer: Hafei
- Also called: GV Moose (United States); MAG XC Truck (United States); Miles ZX40ST (United States); Hafei Towner (Brazil)
- Production: 2003-2012; 2006-2012 (M408)

Body and chassis
- Class: Microvan
- Body style: Microvan; Pickup
- Related: CMC Veryca

Powertrain
- Engine: 1.0L DA465QA I4; 1.0L DA465QA-1A I4
- Transmission: 5 speed manual

Dimensions
- Wheelbase: 2,800 mm (110.2 in)
- Length: 4,680 mm (184.3 in); 3,925 mm (154.5 in) (M408)
- Width: 1,528 mm (60.2 in)
- Height: 1,875 mm (73.8 in)
- Curb weight: 1,010 kg (2,230 lb) (Double row model)–960 kg (2,120 lb) (Single row model)

Chronology
- Successor: Hafei Xin-Minyi

The first generation Hafei Minyi was launched in 2003 with a price starting at RMB 48,800. The first generation Hafei Minyi was the first self-developed domestic model of China. The Minyi uses unibody construction and features airbags for the driver and ABS, with 7-seater and 8-seater models available.

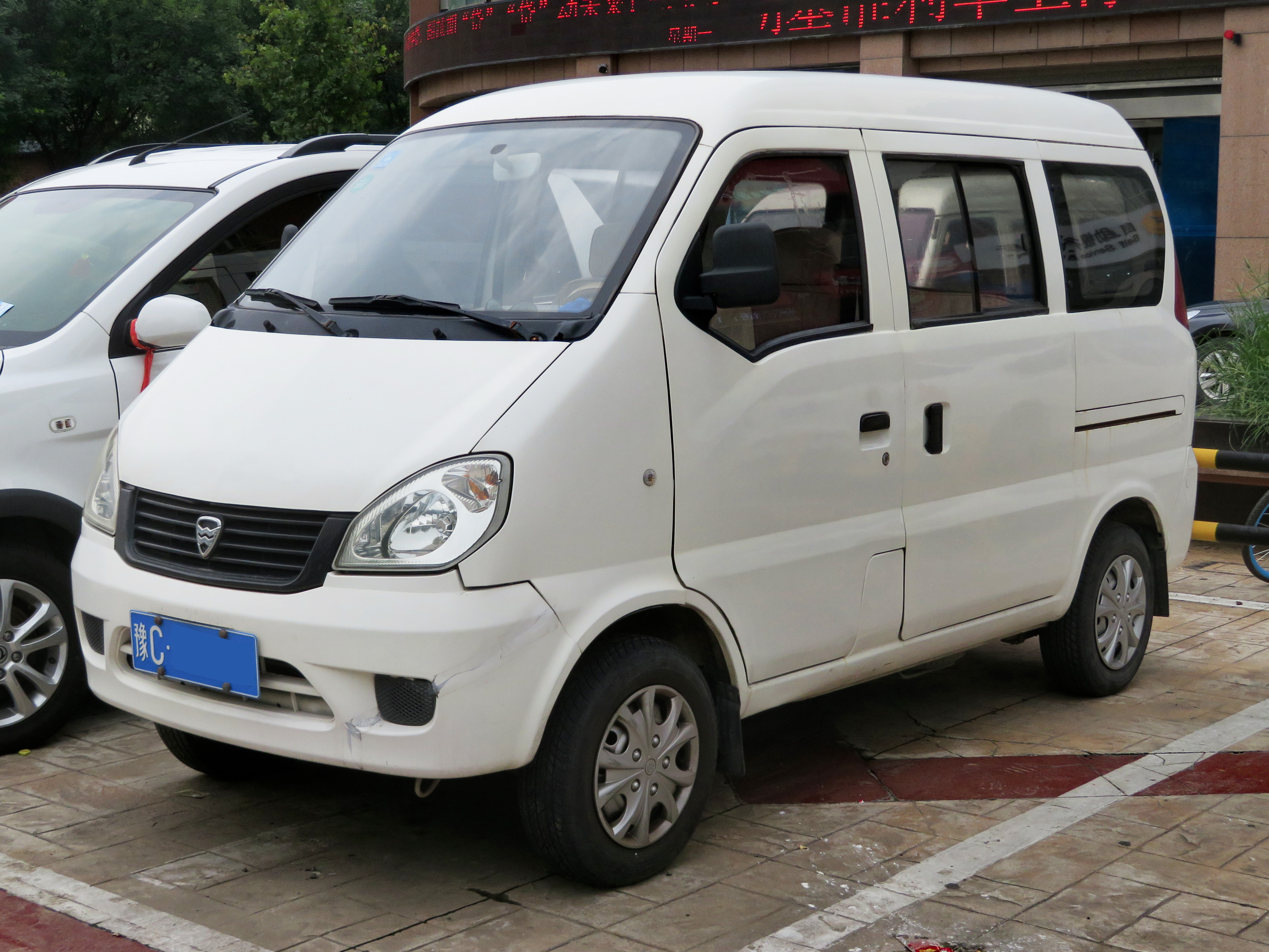
2008 Hafei Minyi, front

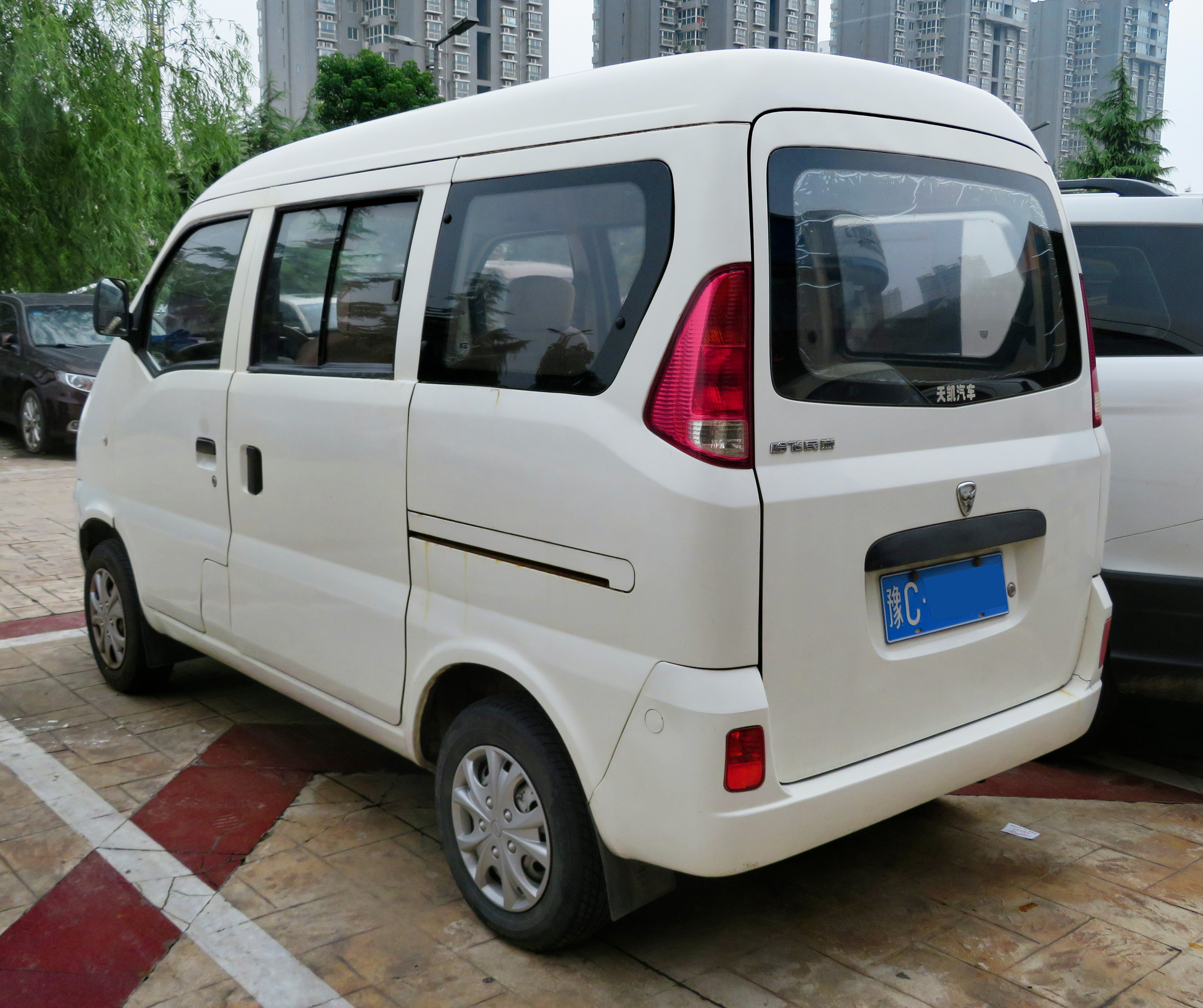
2008 Hafei Minyi, rear

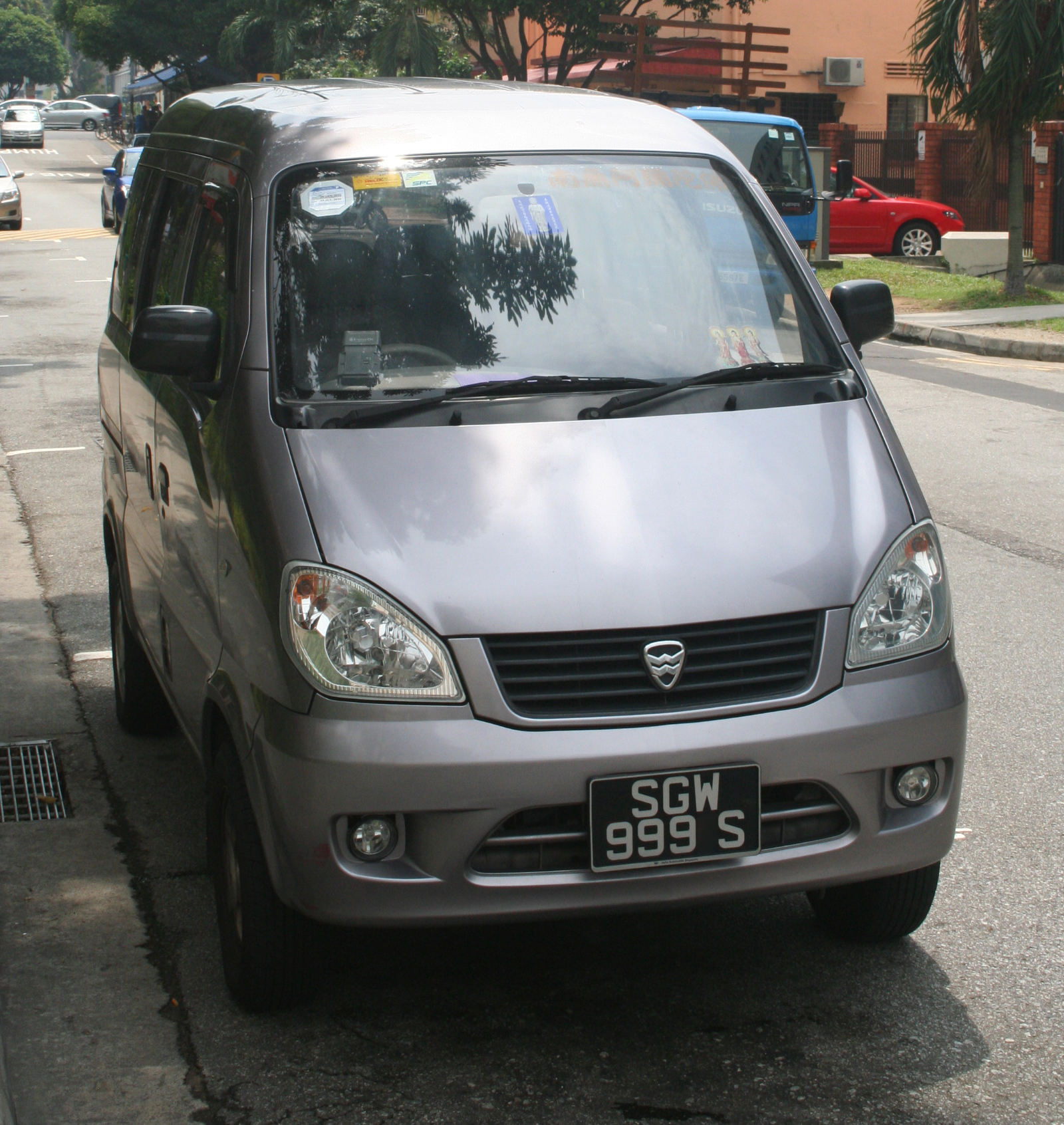
Hafei MinZ (Singapore)

=== Miles ZX40ST electric truck ===
The Miles ZX40ST electric truck is an electric truck based on the Hafei Minyi pickup and debuted in Orlando in the summer of 2007. The truck is governed to a maximum speed of 25 miles (40 km) an hour and was claimed to travel 50–60 miles per charge. Like the ZX40S Advanced Design, this truck also uses an advanced three phase, brushless, AC induction motor, which comes standard with regenerative braking and optional air conditioning. MSRP $19,900.

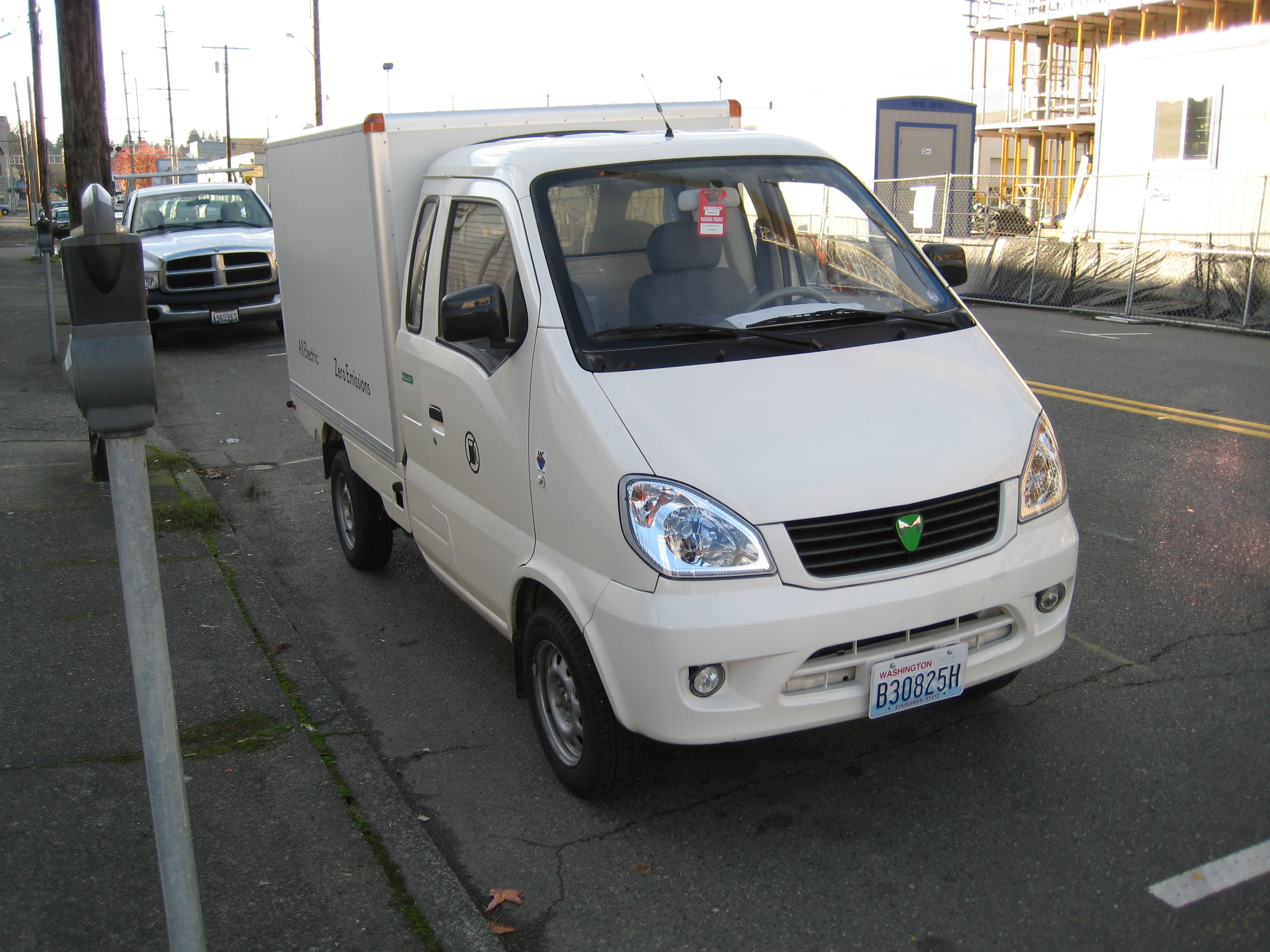
Miles ZX40ST electric truck based on the first generation Hafei Minyi

=== Hafei Minyi M408 ===
The Hafei Minyi M408 is a variant based on the first generation Hafei Minyi focused on the passenger vehicle market with a price starting at RMB 36,300 and was launched during the 2006 Chengdu Auto Show. Dubbed the second generation Minyi, or Minyi II, the Minyi M408 is available with a range of petrol engines including a 1.0 liter, a 1.1 liter, and a 1.3-liter engine.

Styling wise, the Minyi M408 was designed by Italian design house Pininfarina.

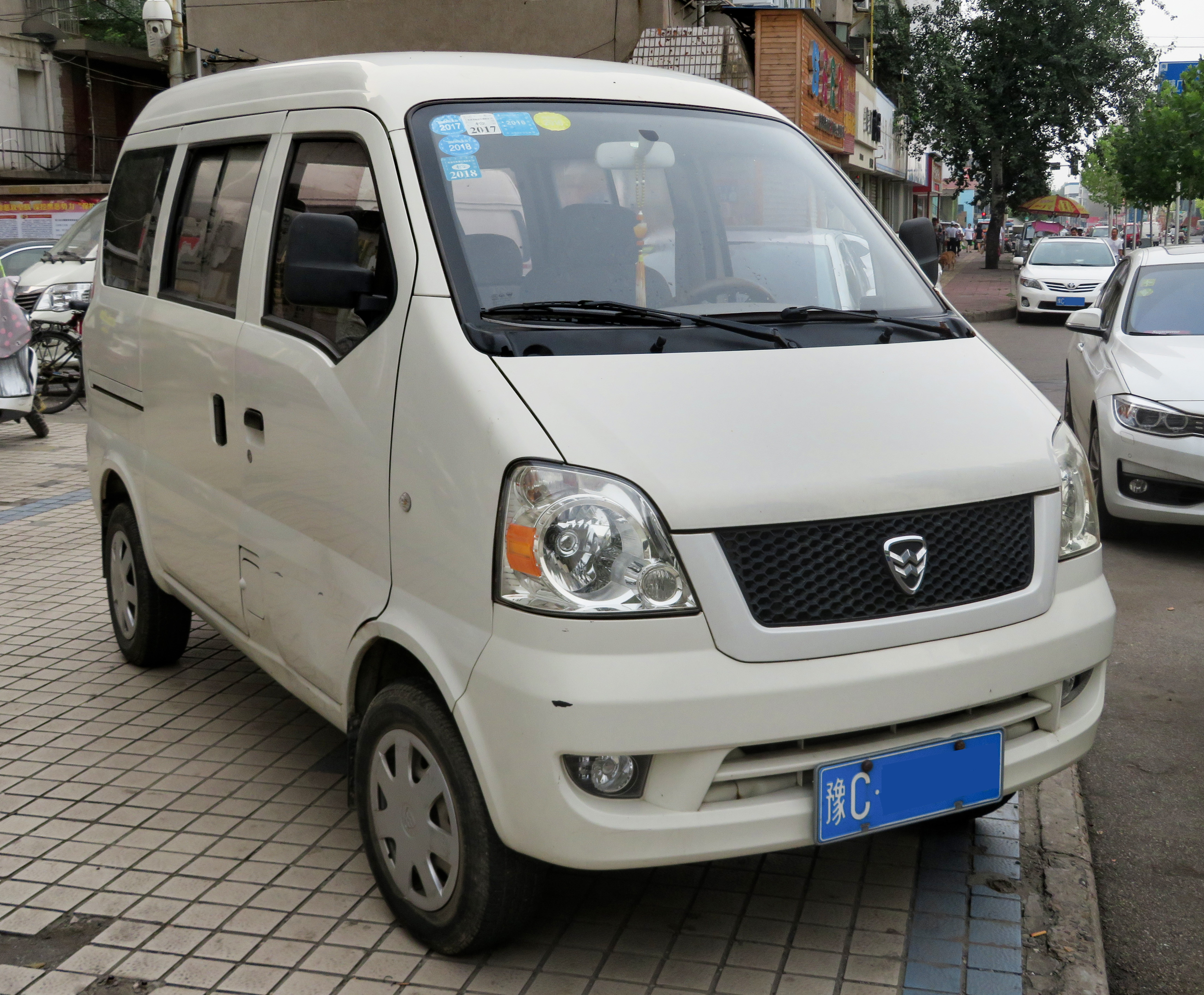
2010 Hafei Minyi M408, front

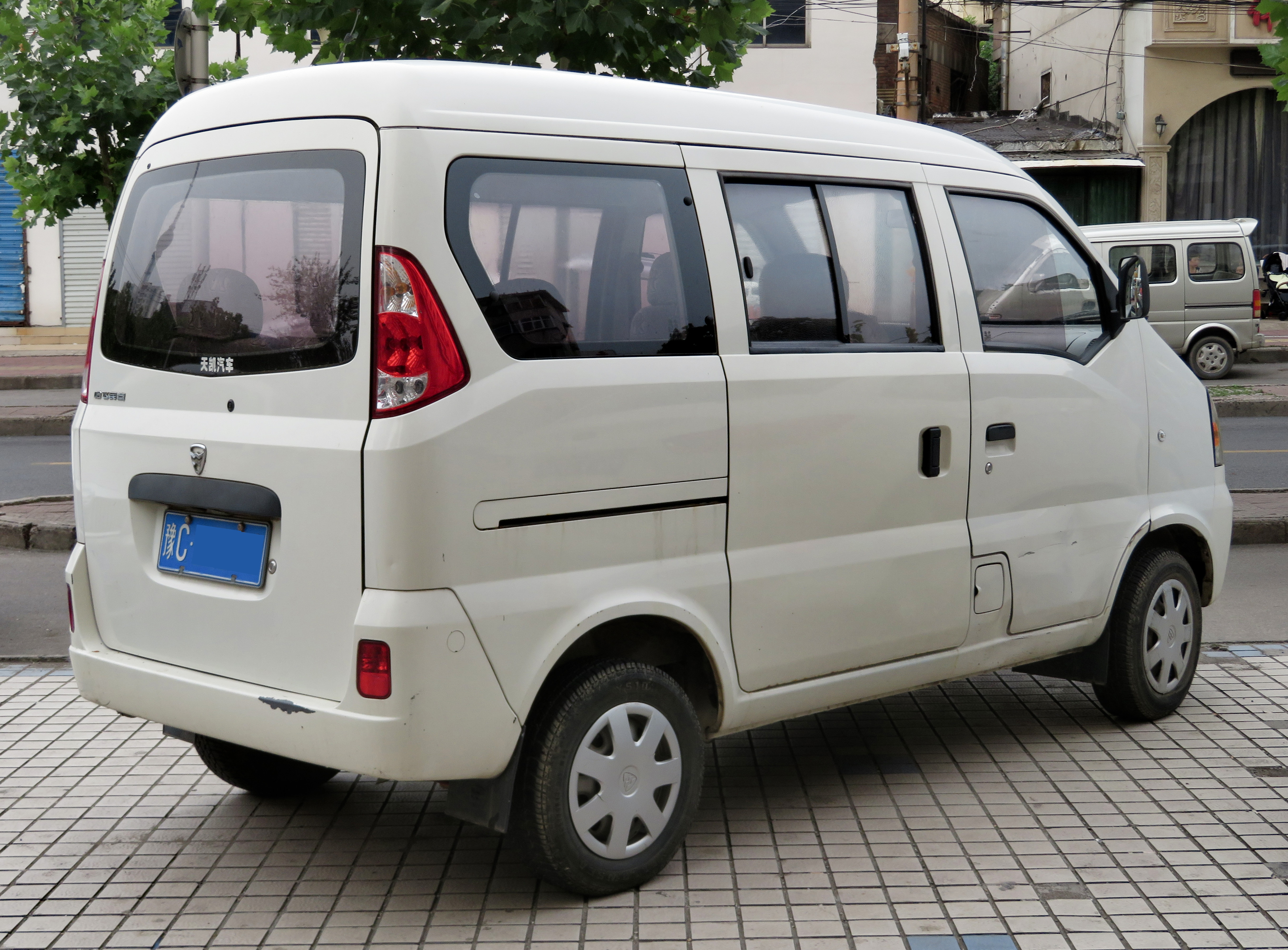
2010 Hafei Minyi M408, rear

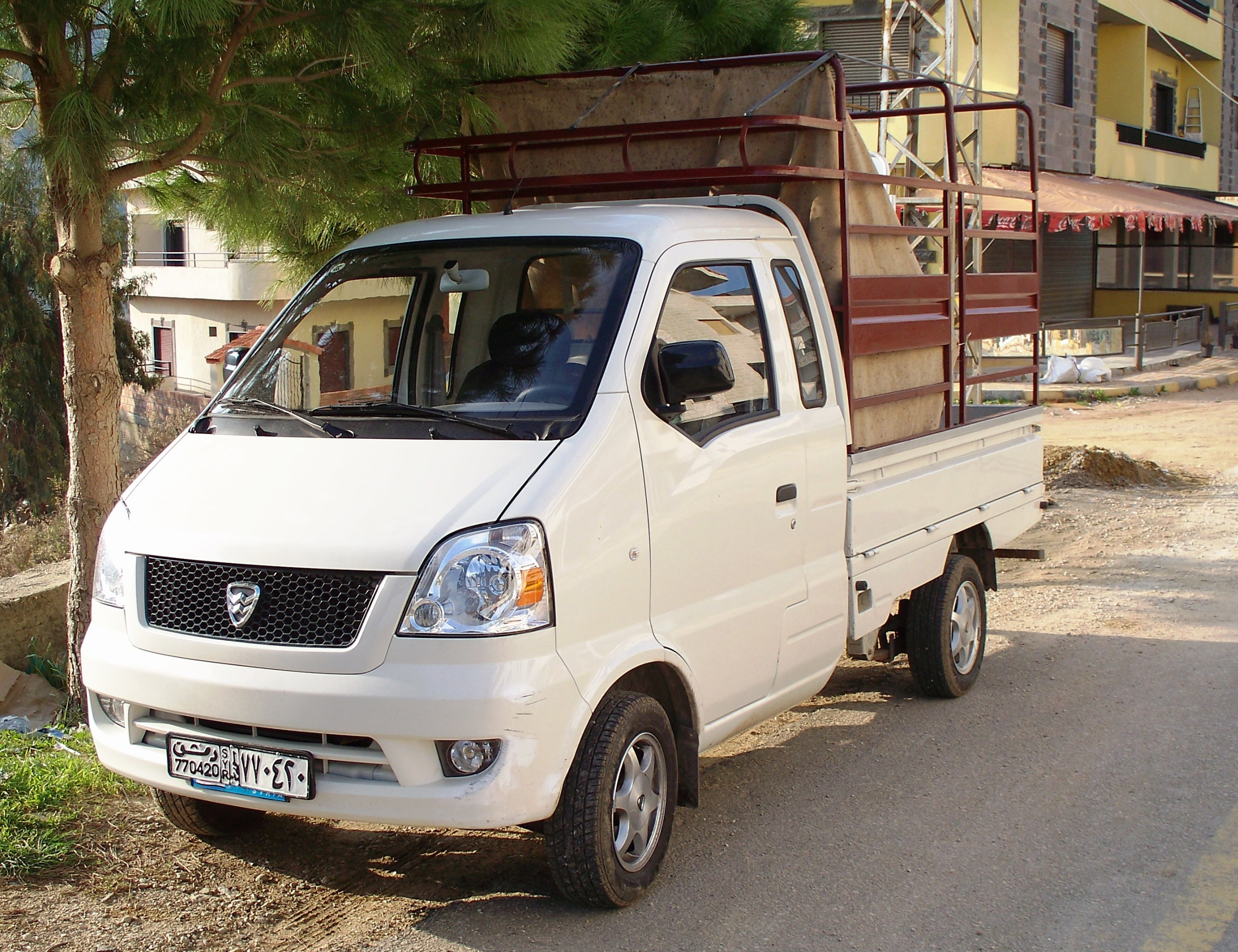
Hafei Minyi single cab pickup

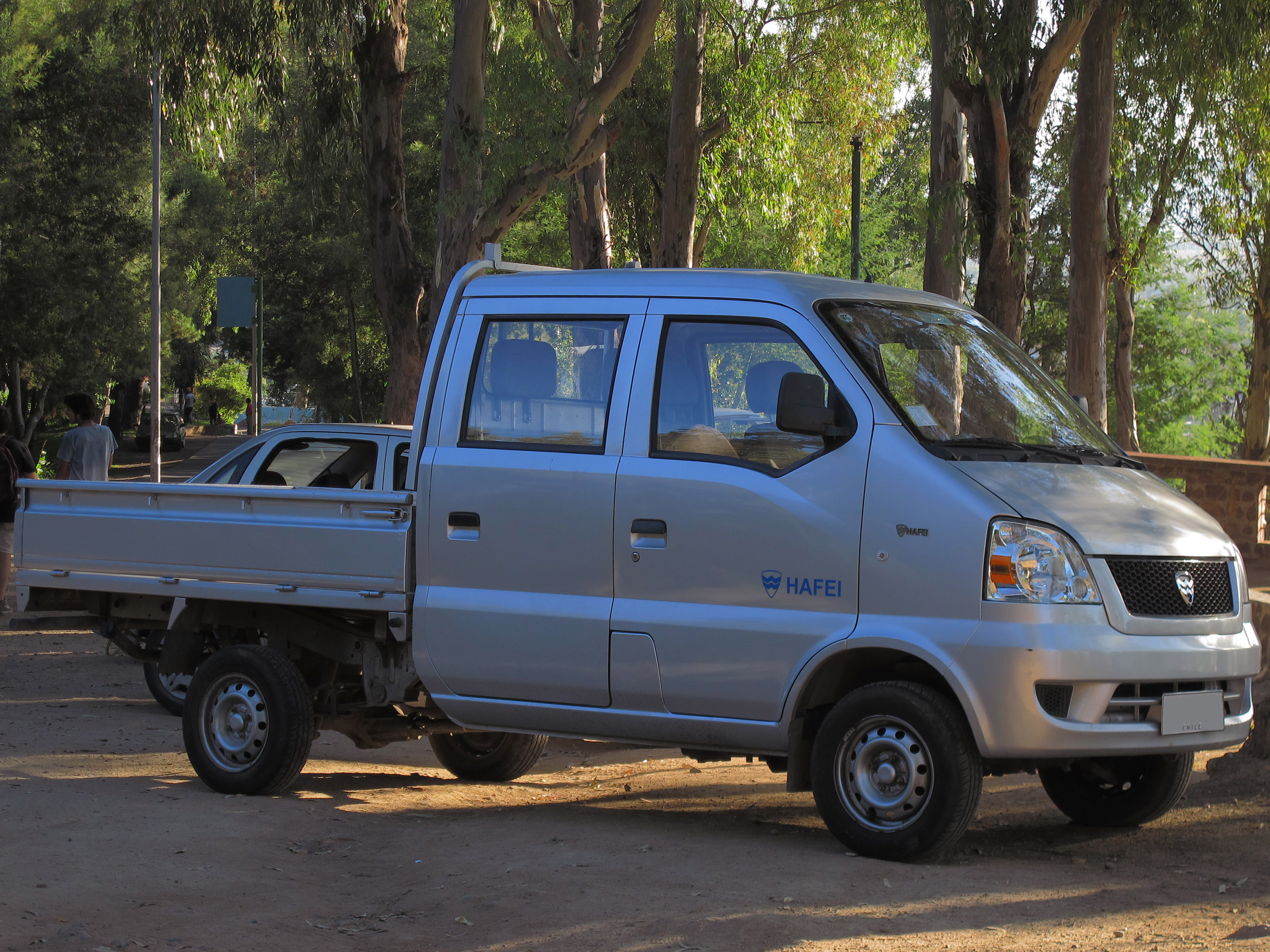
2013 Hafei Minyi Crew Cab pickup

=== Colombia ===
The first generation Hafei Minyi single cab and double cab pickups are available in Colombia starting from July 2012. They have a 1.1-liter engine and feature larger loading pans of up to 2.89 meters for the single cab model and 2.10 meters for the double cab model. Both Minyi pickup models are powered by a 1.1-liter inline-4 engine mated to five-speed manual gearboxes. The Minyi pickup also features mechanical steering, equipped with scanners, radio, tachometer, cloth cushioning, sun visor for the driver and front passenger, cigarette lighter, glove box, and a loading capacity of 815 kilograms in the single cab model and 565 kilograms in the double cab model. They are the largest capacities of their segment in the market. Prices of the pickups are $21,900,000 and $25,400,000 respectively.

== Second Generation (Xin-Minyi) ==
Hafei Xin-Minyi
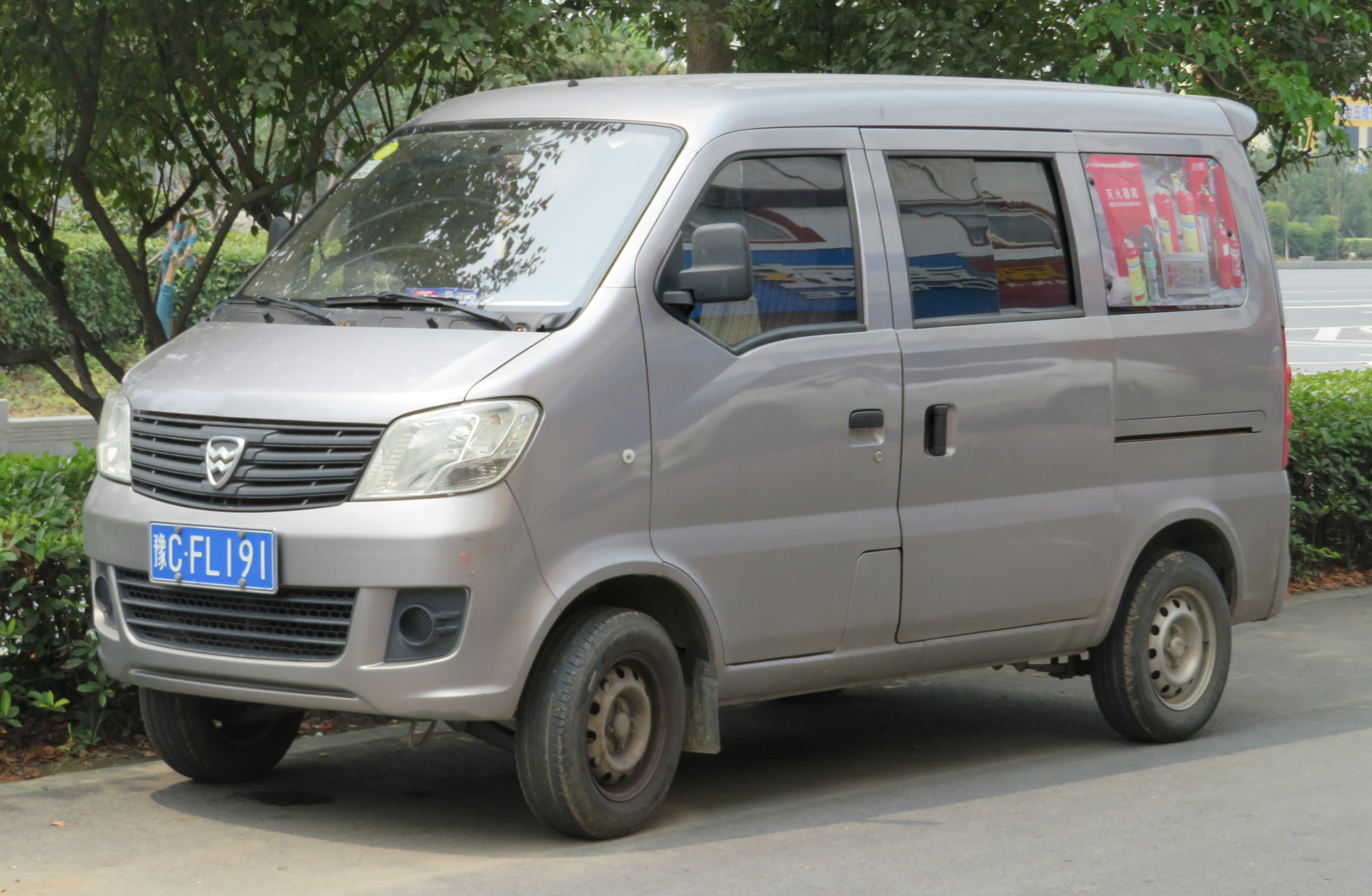

Overview
- Manufacturer: Hafei
- Also called: Hafei Xin-Minyi
- Production: 2012–2018

Body and chassis
- Class: Microvan
- Body style: Microvan
- Related: CMC Veryca

Powertrain
- Engine: 1.0L DA465QA I4
- Transmission: 5 speed manual

Dimensions
- Wheelbase: 2,370 mm (93.3 in)
- Length: 3,735 mm (147.0 in)
- Width: 1,510 mm (59.4 in)
- Height: 1,890 mm (74.4 in)

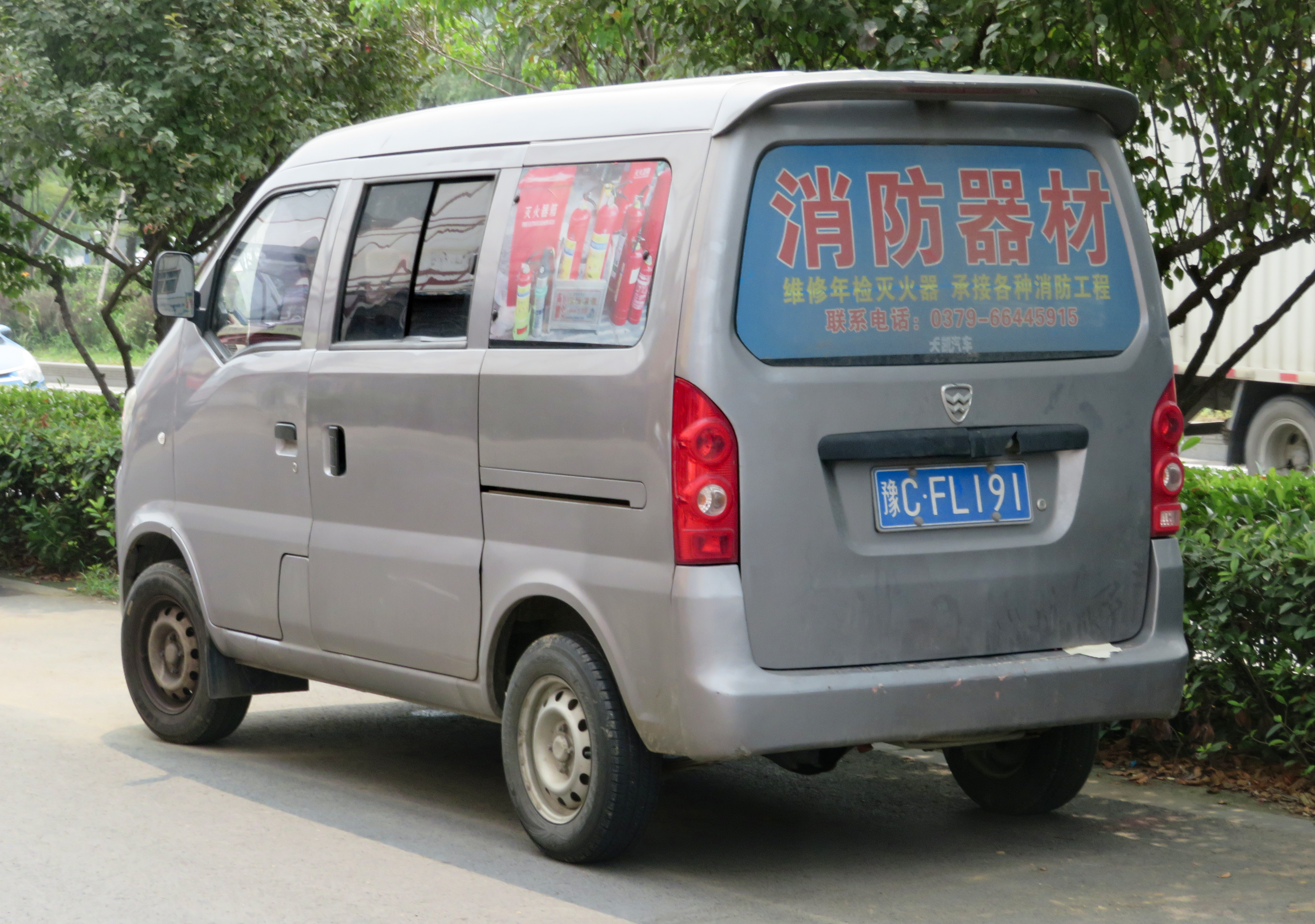
Second generation Hafei Minyi (Xin-Minyi) rear view

A second generation model dubbed the Xin-Minyi was launched during the 2012 Beijing Auto Show.

The updated Hafei Minyi is available in 5 trim levels, with all of them powered by 1.0-liter gasoline engines. There are two versions of the engine, producing 48 hp and 60 hp respectively. The more powerful 1.0-liter engine produces 60 hp (44 kW)/5500rpm and 84Nm/3000-4000rpm. The only transmission is a 5-speed manual gearbox.

=== Colombia ===
The second generation Hafei Minyi was distributed in Colombia by Grupo China Automotriz. This van was launched as the cheapest option on the market as it comes in a panel van version at $19,900,000 with a load capacity of 650Kg. The top trim level is a 7 passenger model priced at $20,900,000.

The Colombia version of the Minyi has a 1.1-liter inline-4 engine and a 5-speed manual transmission. The Minyi also offers optional air conditioning, CD radio, tachometer, fabric cushioning, sun visor for the driver and passenger, cigarette lighter, glove box, third stop and a warranty of 2 years or 30,000 kilometers for private use and 1 year or 50,000 for public service. As of September 2012, it was available in the dealership network of the China Automotive Group, which has been in the national market for more than 8 years with more than 18,000 vehicles rolling in Colombia.
