= Shanghai Maple =

Defunct Chinese car company

Shanghai Maple Guorun Automobile Co., Ltd. 上海华普汽车
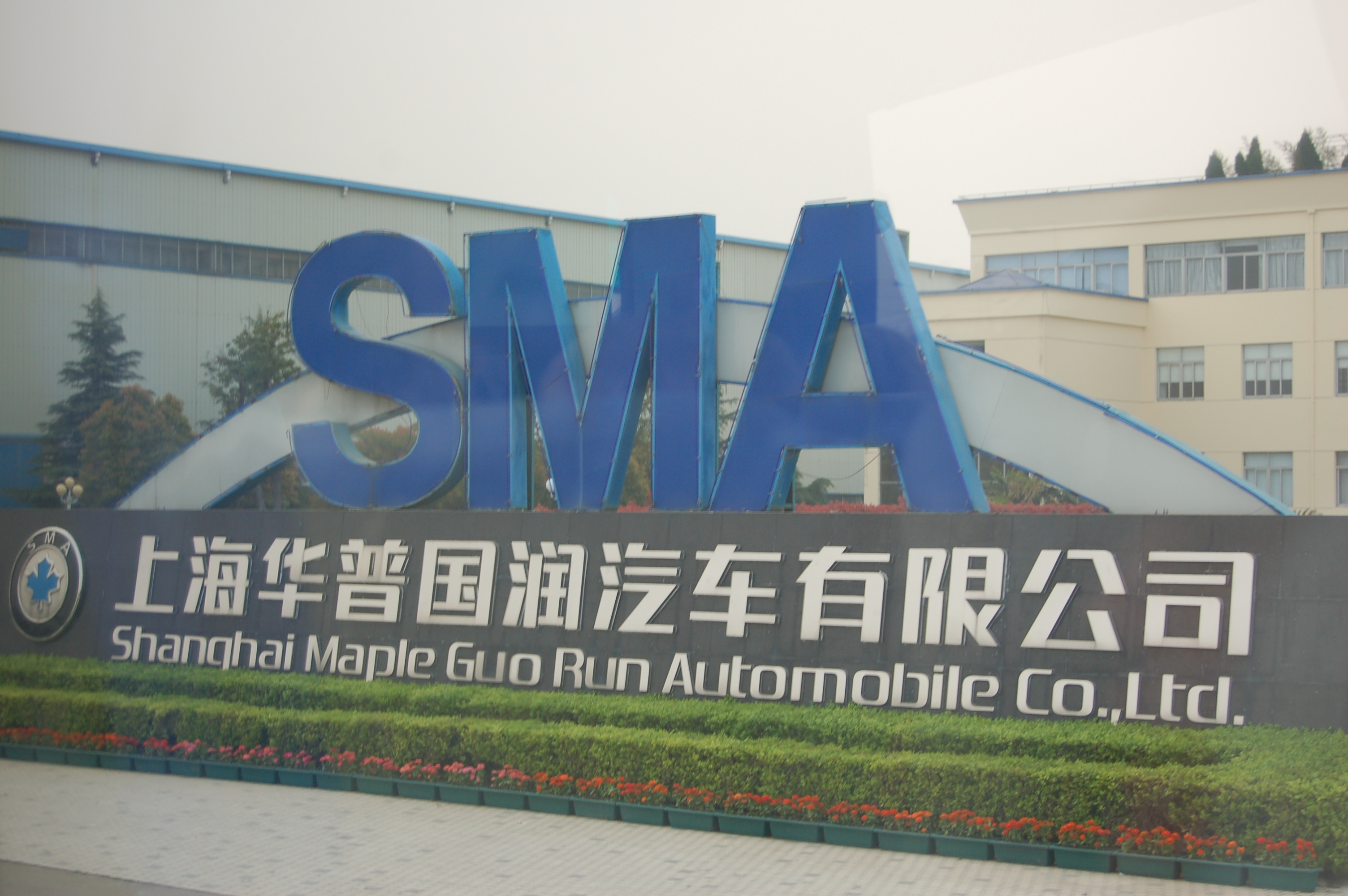
- Shanghai Maple's headquarters in Fengjing, Shanghai
- Type: Subsidiary
- Industry: Automotive
- Founded: 2000 (Fengjing)
- Defunct: 2010, 2022
- Successor: Turned into sub-brand of Livan Automotive
- Headquarters: Fengjing, Shanghai, China
- Products: Automobiles
- Parent: Zhejiang Geely Holding Group

Shanghai Maple Guorun Automobile Co., Ltd. (Shanghai Maple) was a Chinese automobile manufacturing company based in Fengjing, Shanghai, and a subsidiary of Zhejiang Geely Holding Group.

== History ==
Originally Shanghai Maple (SMA, Shanghai Maple Automobiles), the brand was established in 2000, producing Huapu (Maple) branded vehicles. It was founded by Li Shufu's younger brother, Li Shutong. The vehicles are listed under the Langfeng (朗风) brand while being sold as Huapu (华普) products. Geely acquired a strategic holding in Shanghai Maple in 2002, and in 2008, Shanghai Maple was fully consolidated into Geely as their budget brand before phasing it out in 2010.

The first Shanghai Maple vehicle was produced in the summer of 2003, based on the 1990s-era Citroën ZX.

The Maple Marindo, a revised version still on Citroën basis, was displayed at the 2005 Frankfurt Motor Show.

The export of Shanghai Maple vehicles to Egypt began in 2007, where they were marketed as the C51 (saloon) and C52 (saloon with Audi style grille). A sportier R80 hatchback and R81 saloon were exported to markets including Russia and Chile. In 2010, Geely partially phased out the Shanghai Maple marque, replacing it with the Englon budget brand.

In February 2013, Shanghai Maple and Kandi Technologies announced that they had agreed to establish a 50:50 joint venture, Zhejiang Kandi Electric Vehicles Investment, with an initial registered capital of 1 billion yuan (US$160 million), focused on the research and development, production, marketing, and sale of electric vehicles in mainland China. The joint venture agreement was signed on 22 March 2013.

=== Rebirth ===
As of 2020, the Maple brand was revived as a result of the partnership between Geely and Kandi Technologies. Geely holds 78 percent of Fengsheng Automotive Technology Group while the remaining 22 percent is owned by Zhejiang Kandi Vehicle or Kandi Technologies. The new brand was said to focus on research, development, and sales of electric vehicles and vehicle parts, vehicle leasing services, and relevant after-sales services. The revived Maple brand was to make a series of affordable electric cars based on existing Geely petrol cars. The first Maple product was the Maple 30X, based on the Geely Vision X3. An SUV and two hatchbacks were planned for launch in 2021; the manufacturer also announced it was working on several electric vehicles.

In March 2021, Kandi Technologies exited its stake in Maple, transferring its 22 percent equity interest in Fengsheng to Geely.

In 2022, Geely launched a new joint venture between Lifan and Maple called Livan (Ruilan, 睿蓝). Geely announced the launch of the Maple Leaf 60S, Geely's first battery swap car under the Livan brand, produced in association with Lifan and based on the Geely Emgrand GL.

In 2022, after the Lifan Group was acquired by Geely Holding Group, Geely reconsolidated and merged the Maple brand into the Livan brand, ending Maple's existence as an independent brand and making it a model name under the Livan brand.

Timeline of Maple, Kandi and Livian Marque
Year	Company name	Ownership	Marque marketed	Note
Shanghai Maple (2000–2010)
2000	Shanghai Maple Automobiles		Maple	The establishment of Shanghai Maple
2008	Shanghai Maple Automobiles	Geely	Maple	Fully acquired by Geely
2010	Shanghai Maple Automobiles	Geely	None	Maple marque was consolidated and replaced by the Englon
Kandi (2013–2019)
2013	Kandi Electric Vehicles	Geely(50%); Kandi(50%)	Kandi	Kandi and Shanghai Maple(Geely) established 50:50 joint venture, Kandi Electric Vehicles
Maple (2019–2021)
2019	Fengsheng Automobile Technology	Geely(78%); Kandi(22%)	Maple	Geely acquired the majority of the Kandi Electric Vehicles, renamed it to Fengsheng Automobile; The Maple marque was revived
2021	Fengsheng Automobile Technology	Geely	Maple	Geely acquired all the stake of the joint venture
2021	Livan Automotive	Geely(50%); Lifan Technology(50%)	Maple	Geely and Lifan Technology established 50:50 joint venture, Livan Automotive; The Livan Automotive inherits the Maple marque from Fengsheng Automobile
Livan (2024–present)
2022	Livan Automotive	Geely(50%); Lifan Technology(50%)	Livan	Livan marque operate independently; Maple brand was folded into the Livan, becoming a model name used on legacy designs.

== Products ==
=== Shanghai Maple ===
- 2003–2010: Maple Hisoon (海迅), sedan/hatchback
- 2004–2010: Maple Marindo/Haifeng (海锋), sedan
- 2005–2010: Maple Haiyu (海域) (2005–2010), sedan/hatchback
- 2005–2010: Maple Hysoul (海尚) (2005–2010), sedan
- 2009–2010: Maple Haijing (海景) (2009–2010), sedan
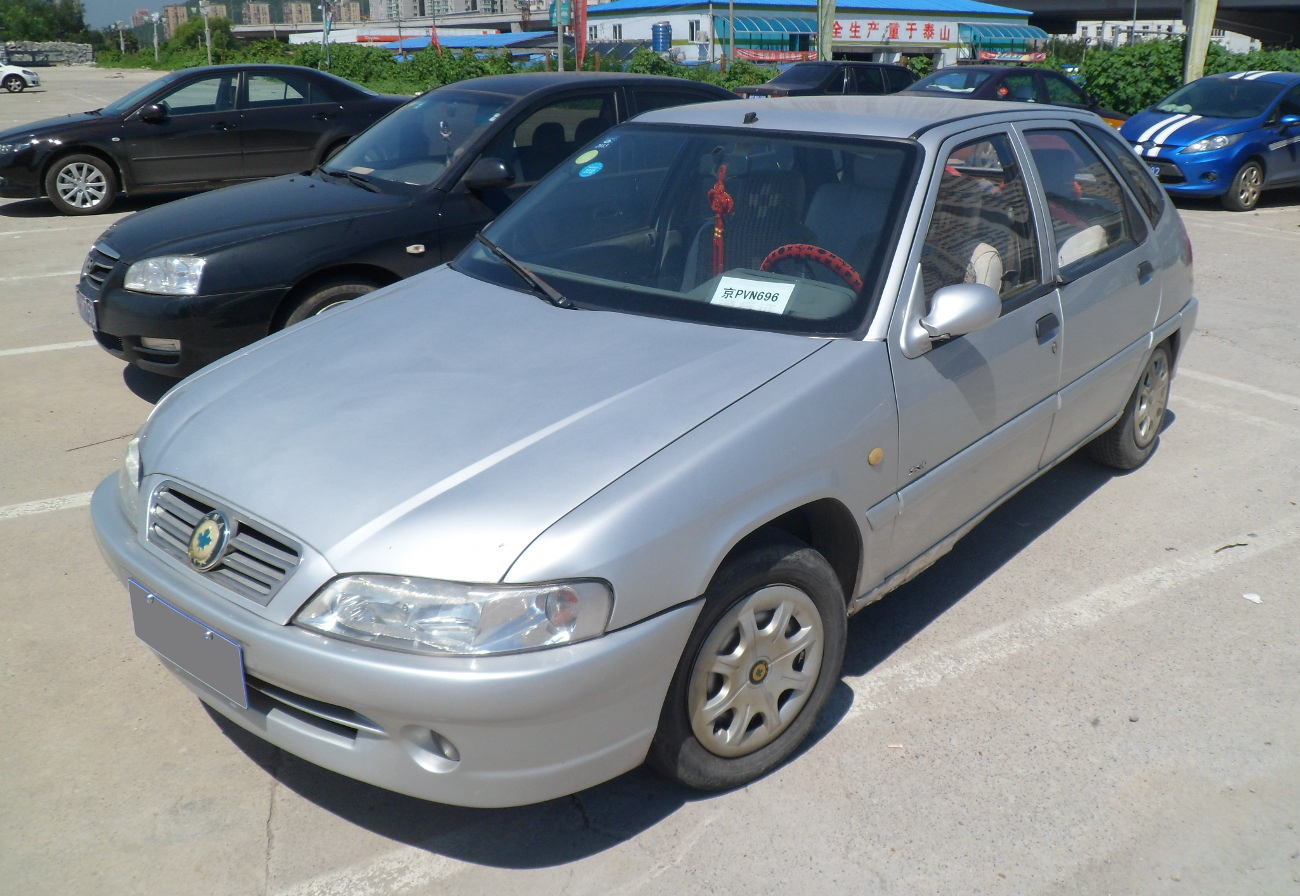
Maple Whirlwind (Biaofeng)

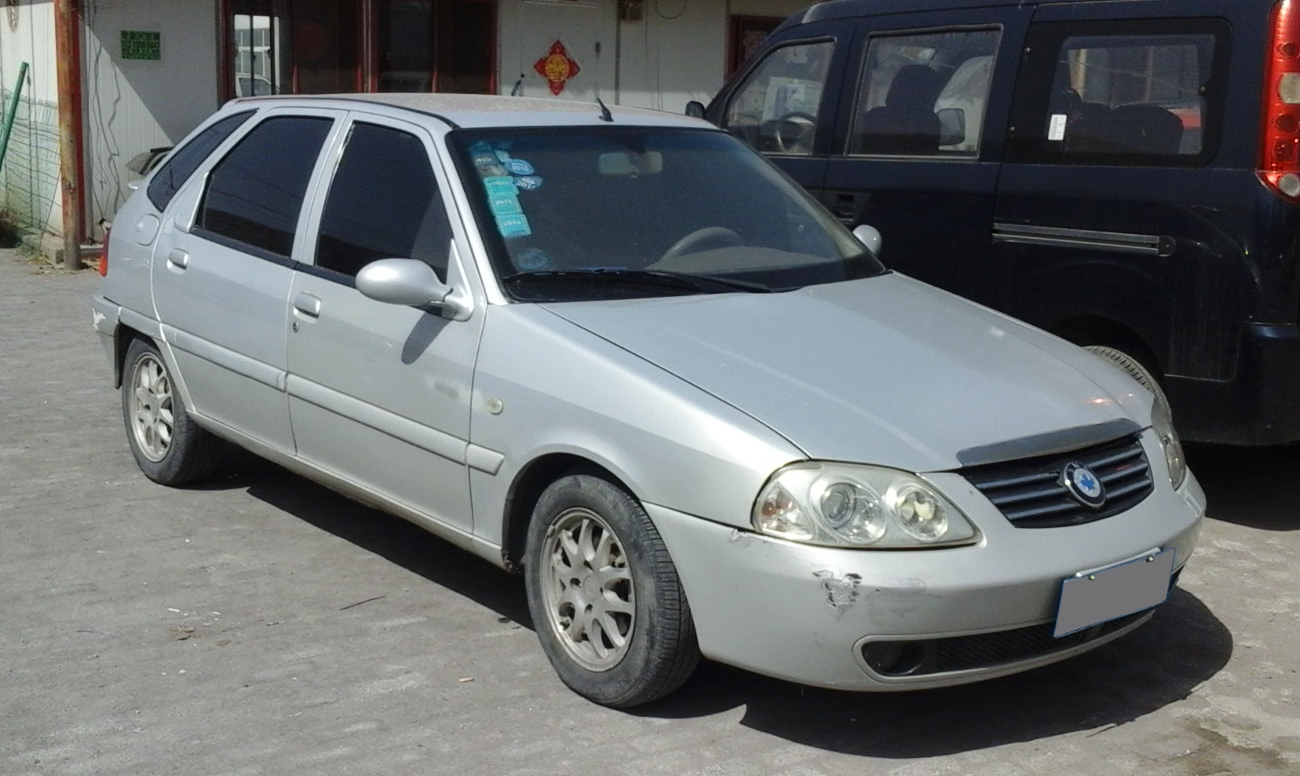
Maple Marindo hatch

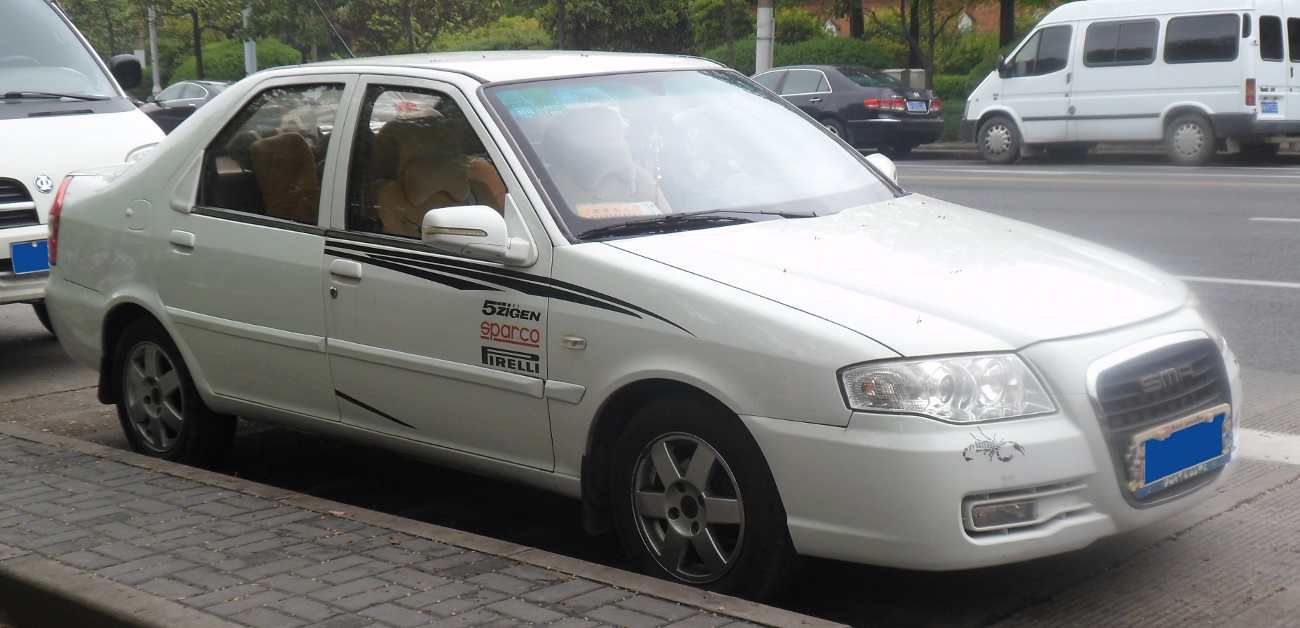
Maple Marindo sedan

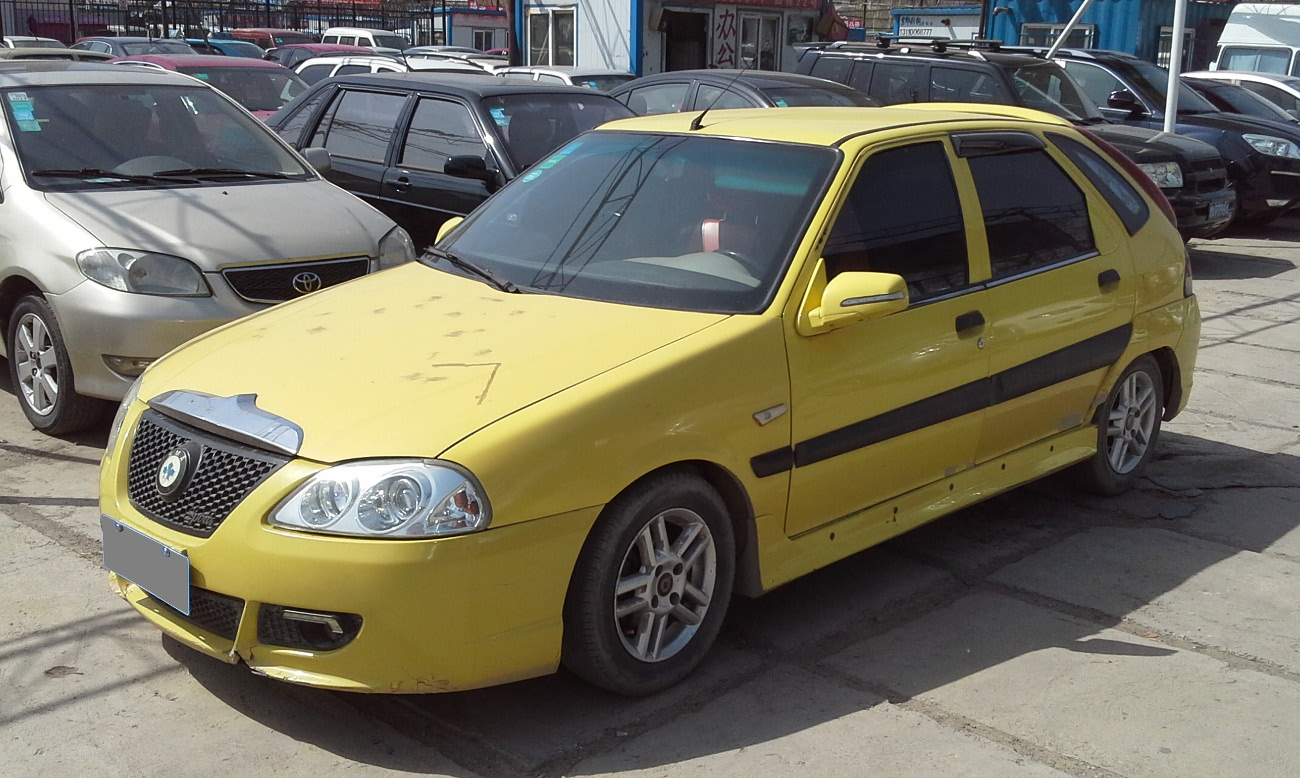
Maple Hisoon hatch

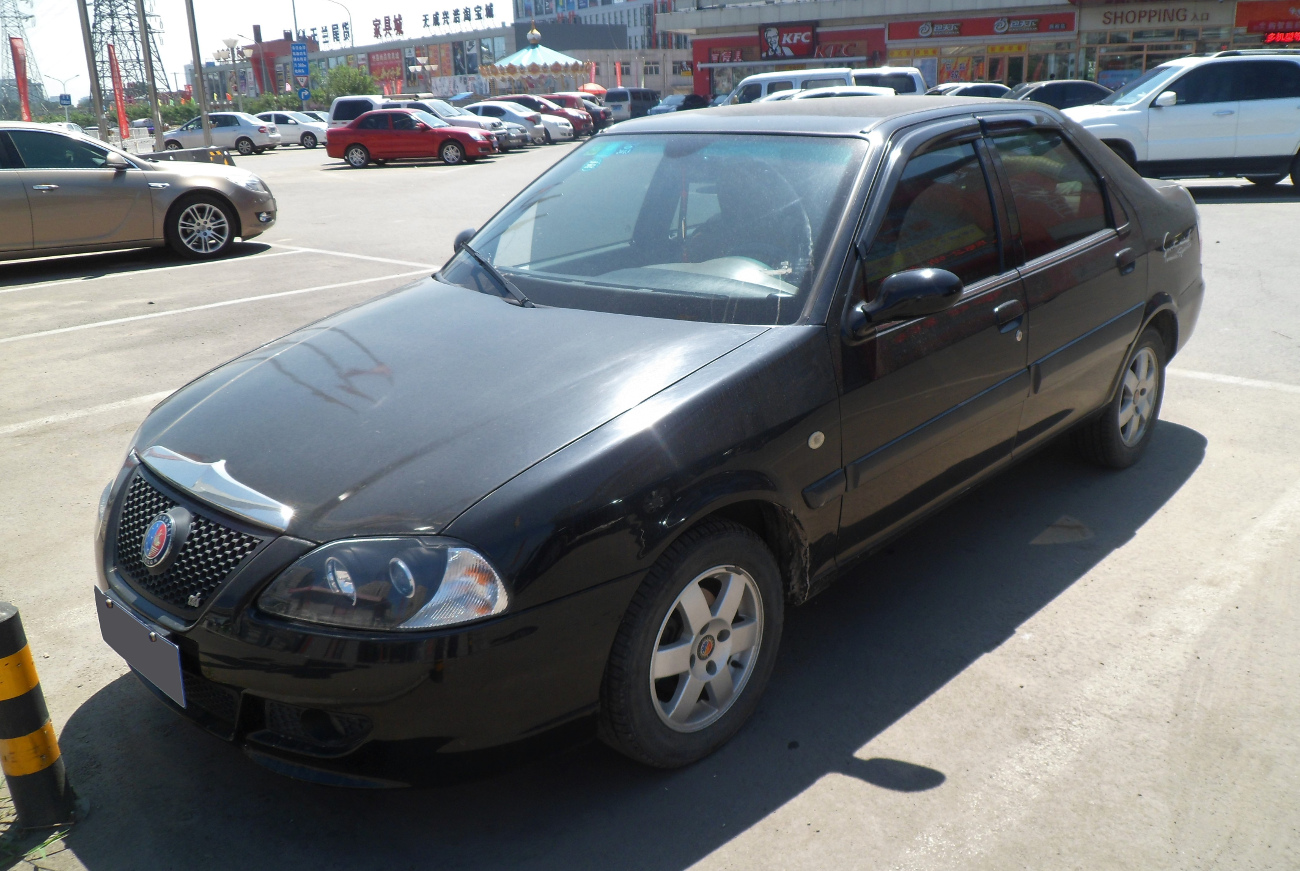
Maple Hisoon sedan

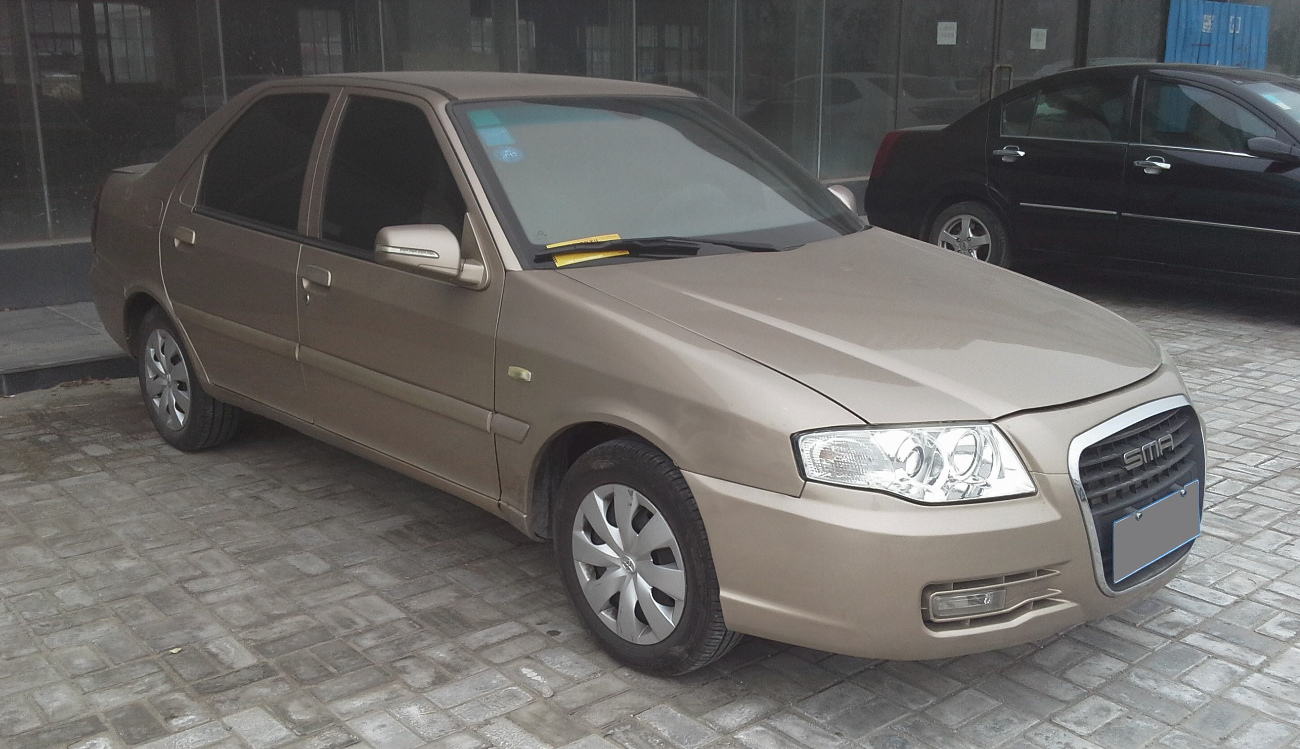
Maple Hysoul (Haishang)

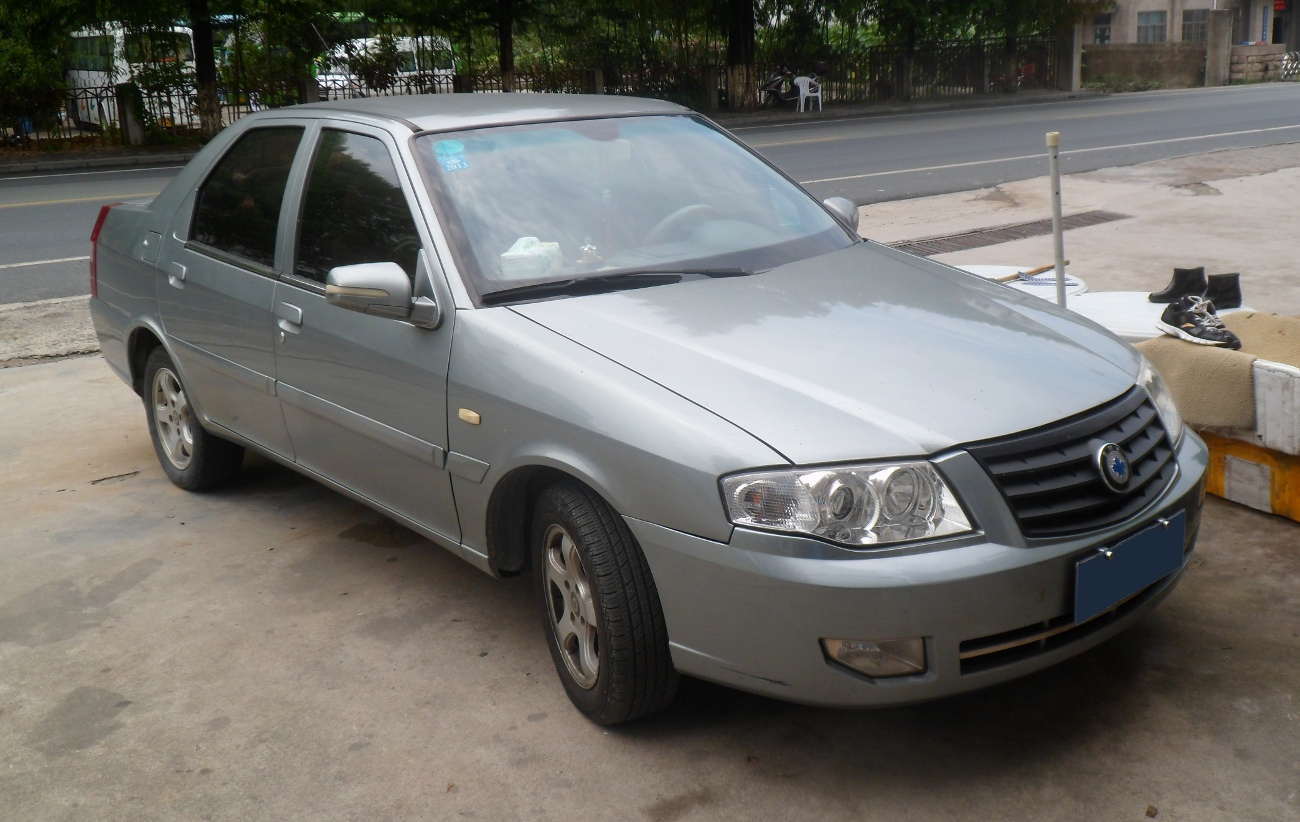
Maple Haifeng

=== Maple (electric) ===
- 2020–2022: Maple 30X, subcompact SUV, rebadged Geely Vision X3 – sold as Livan Maple 30X as of 2022
- 2020–2022: Maple 80V, MPV, rebadged electric variant of Geely Jiaji – sold as Livan Maple 80V as of 2022
- 2021–2022: Maple 60S, compact sedan, rebadged electric variant of Geely Emgrand L – sold as Livan Maple 60S as of 2022
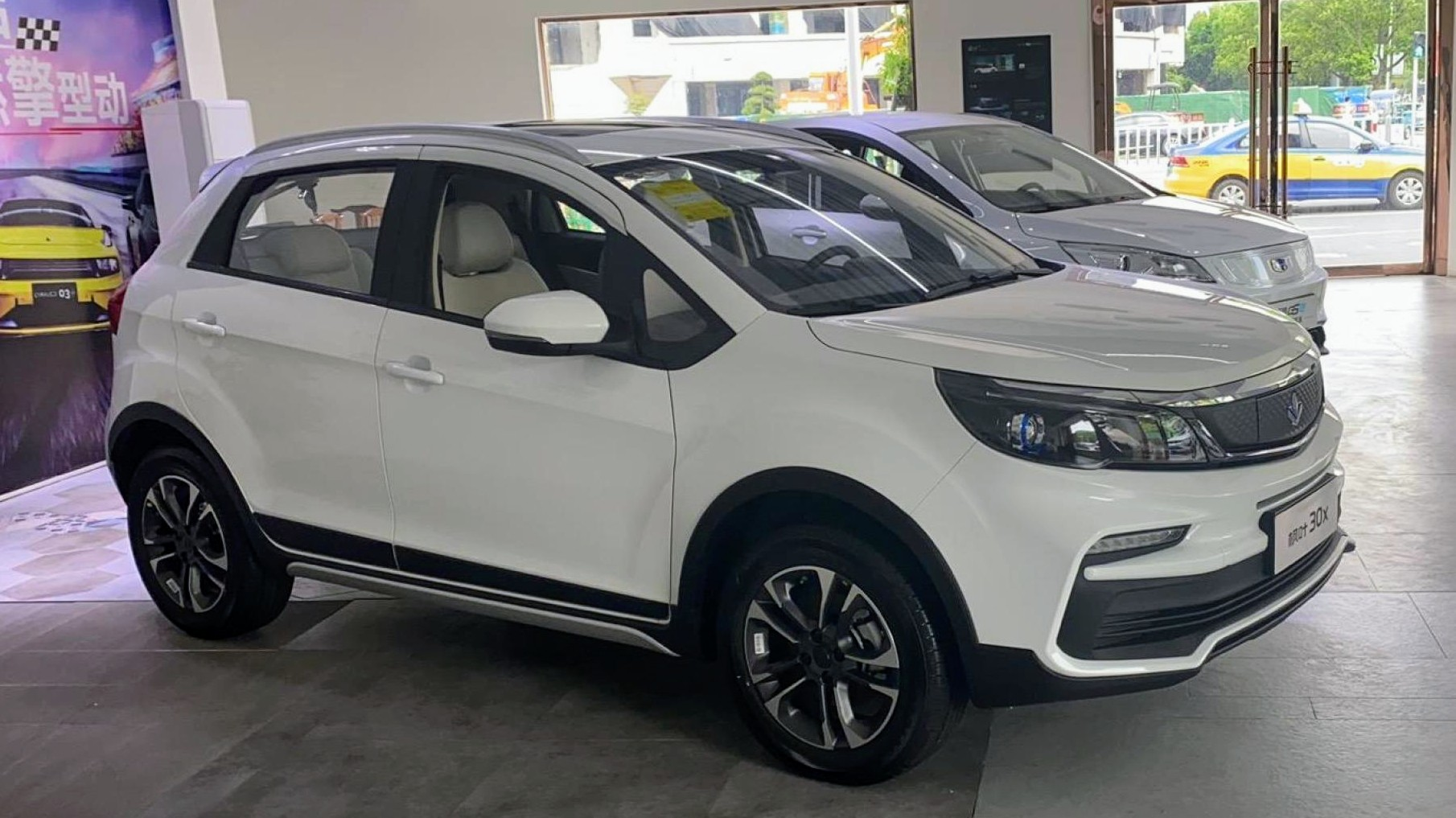
Maple 30x

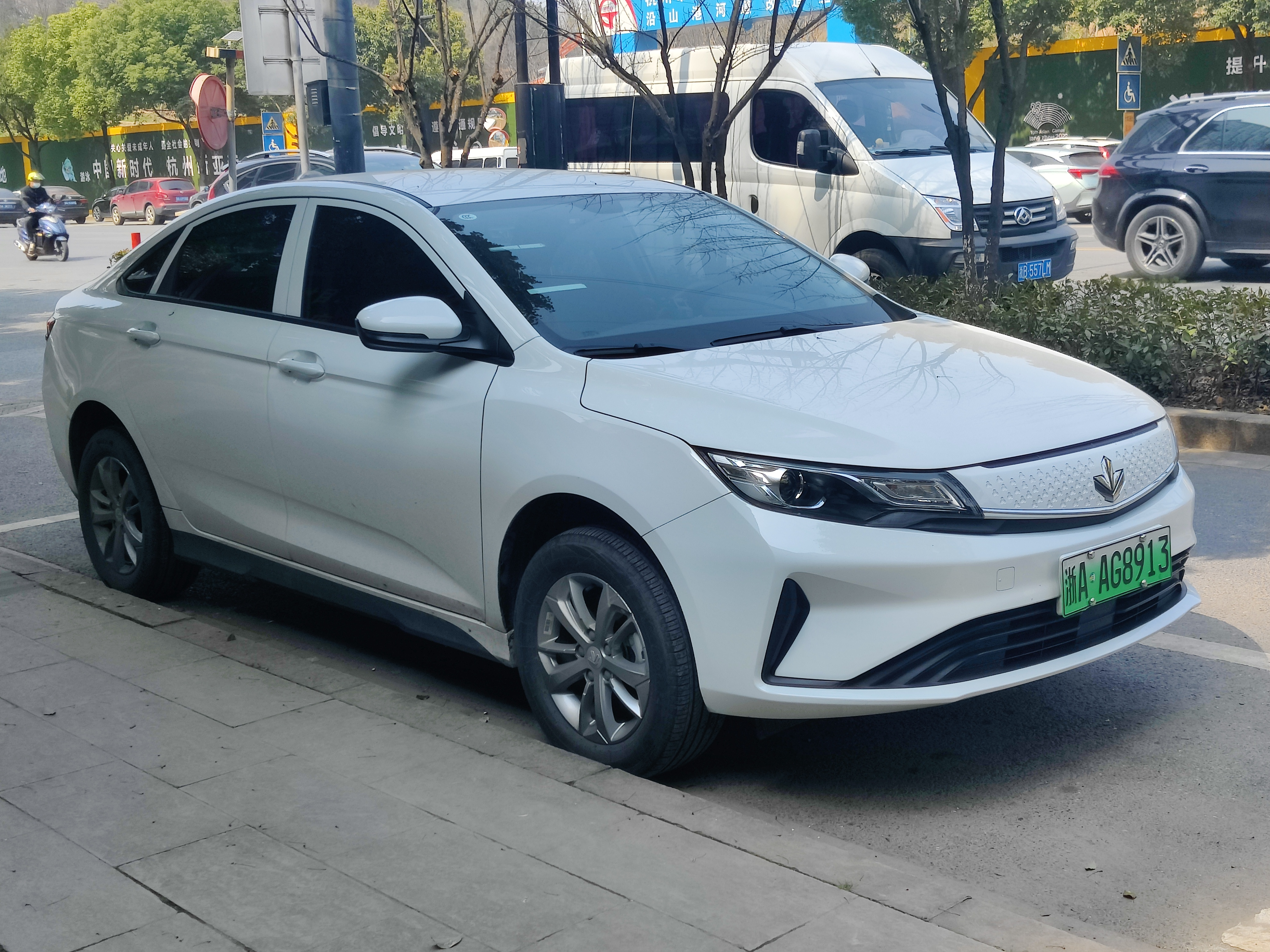
Maple 60S

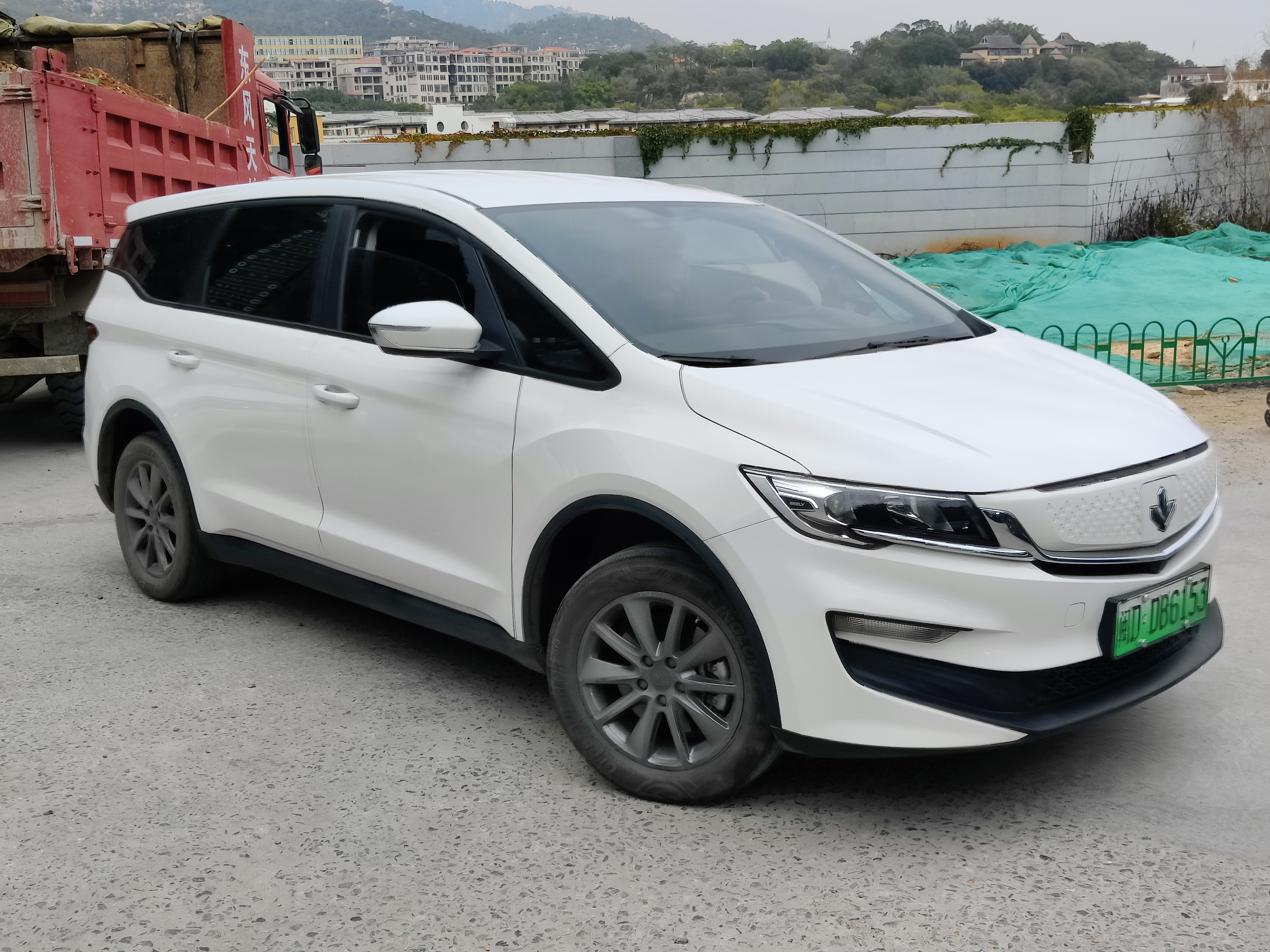
Maple 80V
