= Livan Automotive =

Chinese automotive brand

- Formerly: Shanghai Maple Automobile (2000–2010); Maple (2019–2022)
- Type: Subsidiary
- Industry: Automotive
- Founded: 2000 (Fengjing) as Shanghai Maple Guorun Automobile Co., Ltd.; 上海華普汽車 (first incarnation); 2020 (second incarnation)
- Defunct: Defunct during 2010–2020
- Headquarters: Fengjing, Shanghai, China
- Area served: China; Russia; Middle East; Spain
- Key people: Zhou Zhongcheng (President and CEO)
- Products: Automobiles
- Owner: Qianli Technology (55%); Geely Qizheng (45%)
- Parent: Zhejiang Geely Holding
- Subsidiaries: Shanghai LTI Automobile Components Co., Ltd.
- Website: livanauto.com

Livan Automotive (Chinese: 睿蓝汽车; pinyin: Ruìlán Qìchē) is a joint venture company between Qianli Technology (formerly Lifan Technology) and Geely Qizheng, a company owned by Zhejiang Geely Holding (ZGH). The brand was founded in 2022 following a merger between Geely-owned Maple and Lifan Technology.

In China, Livan targeted the battery-swapping electric vehicle market. The joint venture manufactures electric vehicles using Geely's existing platforms under Livan and Maple brands. In export markets such as Russia, Livan became Geely's budget brand selling internal combustion vehicles.

On January 24, 2022, after Lifan Group was acquired by ZGH, Geely reconsolidated and merged its previous subsidiary Maple Automobile Co., Ltd. into the Livan brand. This move resulted in Maple exiting the market as an independent brand and becoming a model name under the Livan brand.

== History ==
Originally Shanghai Maple (SMA, Shanghai Maple Automobiles), the brand was established in 2000, producing Huapu (Maple) branded vehicles. The first Shanghai Maple vehicle was produced in the summer of 2003, based on the 1990s-era Citroën ZX. Geely acquired a strategic holding in Shanghai Maple in 2002, and in 2008, Shanghai Maple was fully consolidated into Geely as their budget brand before it was phased out in 2010 in favor of the Englon budget brand.

In March 2013, Geely and Kandi Technologies established a 50:50 joint venture, Zhejiang Kandi Electric Vehicles Investment, focused on the research and development, production, marketing, and sale of electric vehicles in mainland China. As a result of this partnership, the Maple brand was revived in 2020. The revived Maple brand began producing a series of affordable electric cars based on existing Geely petrol cars, beginning with the Maple 30X, based on the Geely Vision X3.

In March 2021, Kandi Technologies exited its stake, transferring its 22 percent equity interest to Geely. In 2022, Geely launched a joint venture between Lifan and Maple called Livan (Ruilan, 睿蓝). Geely announced the launch of the Maple Leaf 60S, Geely's first battery swap car under the Livan brand, produced in association with Lifan and based on the Geely Emgrand GL. In early 2022 the Maple brand was folded into the new Livan brand, becoming a model name used on legacy designs.

During the Livan brand launch later in June 2022, a brand new model, the Livan 7 electric fastback crossover was teased, while a few days later at the 2022 Chongqing Auto Show, the Livan 9 electric mid-size crossover SUV was shown for the first time being developed based on the Geely Haoyue.

Livan entered the Russian market in mid-2023. Instead of being an electric vehicle brand, Livan in Russia became Geely's budget brand, selling older Geely models with modified styling. Livan also entered several markets in 2025 with petrol-powered models, such as Spain and United Arab Emirates.

In February 2024, Geely Automobile Holdings sold its 45% stake in Livan Automotive to Geely Qizheng, another company under Zhejiang Geely Holding. As of 2024, Geely Qizheng and Lifan Technology hold 45% and 55% of Livan respectively, both are holding subsidiaries of Geely Group and still retained within the Geely Group.

In October 2024, Livan entered a partnership with Aletra Mobil Nusantara, an Indonesian company, to develop and market right-hand drive electric vehicles in Indonesia under the Aletra brand. Aletra introduced its first vehicle, the Aletra L8 (a rebadged Livan 8) in November 2024.

In March 2025, the major shareholder Lifan Technology was renamed to Chongqing Qianli Technology.

In April 2025, for the Chinese market, the Livan marque was consolidated and became a product line under Geely Auto.

Timeline of Maple, Kandi and Livan
Year	Company name	Ownership	Marque marketed	Note
Shanghai Maple (2000–2010)
2000	Shanghai Maple Automobiles		Maple	The establishment of Shanghai Maple.
2008	Shanghai Maple Automobiles	Geely	Maple	Fully acquired by Geely.
2010	Shanghai Maple Automobiles	Geely	None	Maple marque was consolidated and replaced by the Englon.
Kandi (2013–2019)
2013	Kandi Electric Vehicles	Geely (50%) Kandi (50%)	Kandi	Kandi and Shanghai Maple (Geely) established 50:50 joint venture, Kandi Electric Vehicles.
Maple (2019–2021)
2019	Fengsheng Automobile Technology	Geely (78%) Kandi (22%)	Maple	Geely acquired the majority of the Kandi Electric Vehicles, renamed it to Fengsheng Automobile.; The Maple marque was revived.
2021	Fengsheng Automobile Technology	Geely	Maple	Geely acquired all the stake of the joint venture.
2021	Livan Automotive	Geely (50%) Lifan Technology (50%)	Maple	Geely and Lifan Technology established 50:50 joint venture, Livan Automotive.; The Livan Automotive inherits the Maple marque from Fengsheng Automobile.
Livan (2024–present)
2022	Livan Automotive	Geely (50%) Lifan Technology (50%)	Livan	Livan marque operates independently.; Maple brand was folded into the Livan, becoming a model name used on legacy designs.
2025	Livan Automotive	Geely (45%) Chongqin Qianli Technology (55%)	Geely Livan	Geely Auto sold its 45% stake in Livan Automotive to Geely Qizheng, another company under Zhejiang Geely Holding.; Lifan Technology was renamed to Chongqing Qianli Technology; The Livan marque was consolidated and became a product line under Geely Auto

== Products ==
=== Current models ===
- Livan 7 (2022–present), coupe compact SUV, BEV
- Livan 9 (2022–present), mid-size SUV, rebadged BEV variant of Geely Haoyue
- Livan 8 (2024–present), compact MPV, rebadged BEV variant of Geely Jiaji L
- Livan Blue Balloon (2025–present), City car, rebadged BEV variant of Geely Panda Mini EV
- Livan X3 Pro (2023–present), subcompact SUV, rebadged Geely Yuanjing X3 Pro
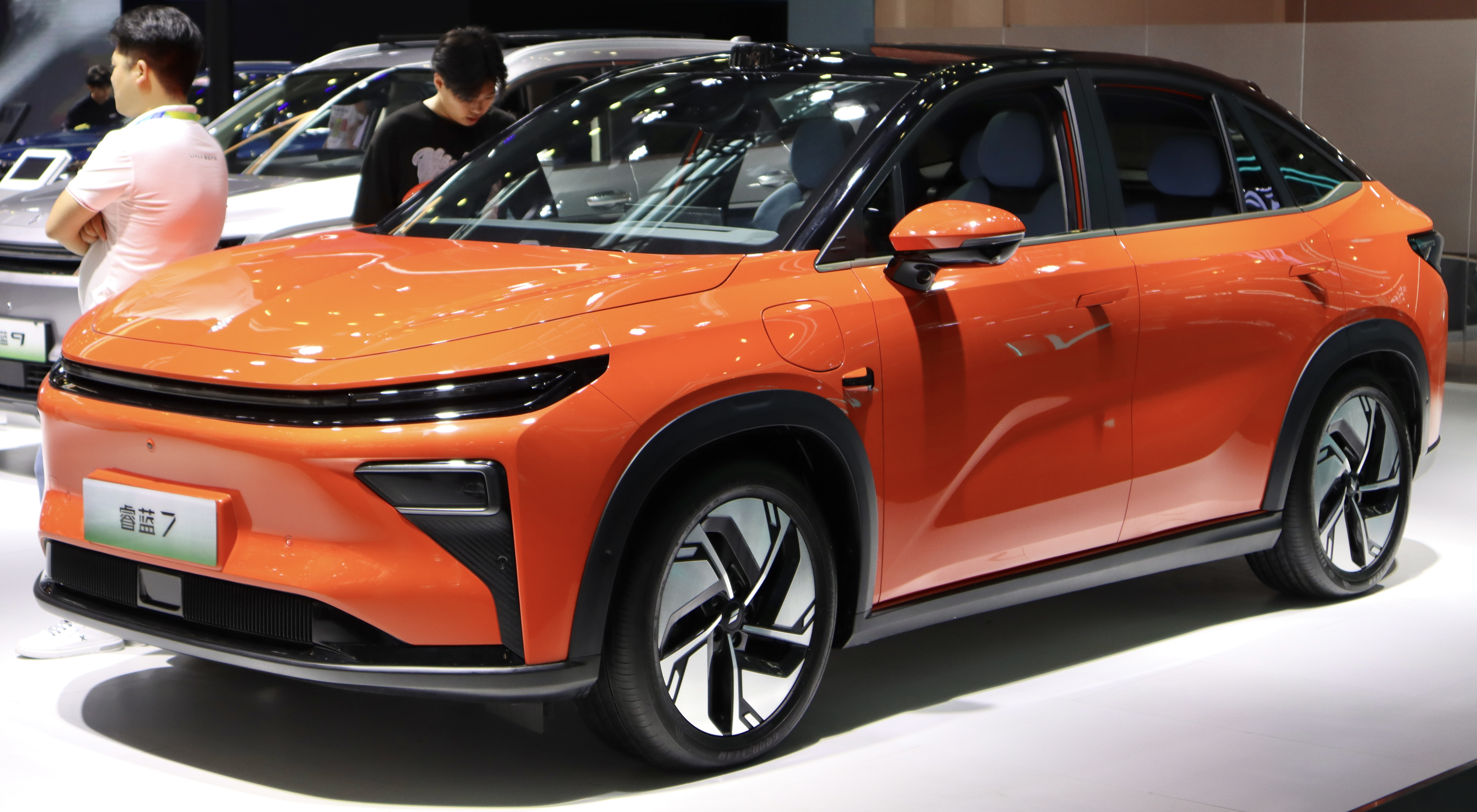
Livan 7

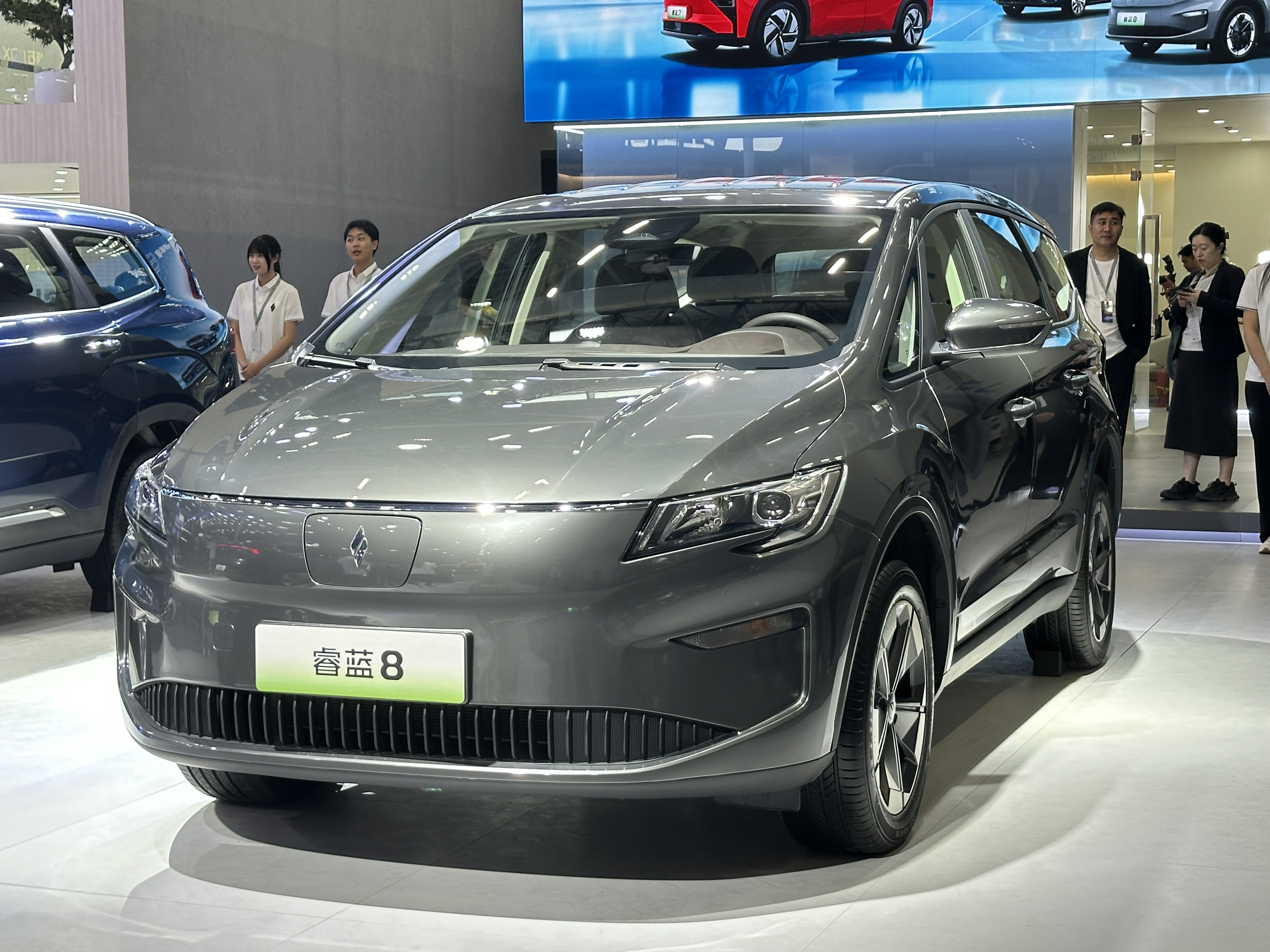
Livan 8

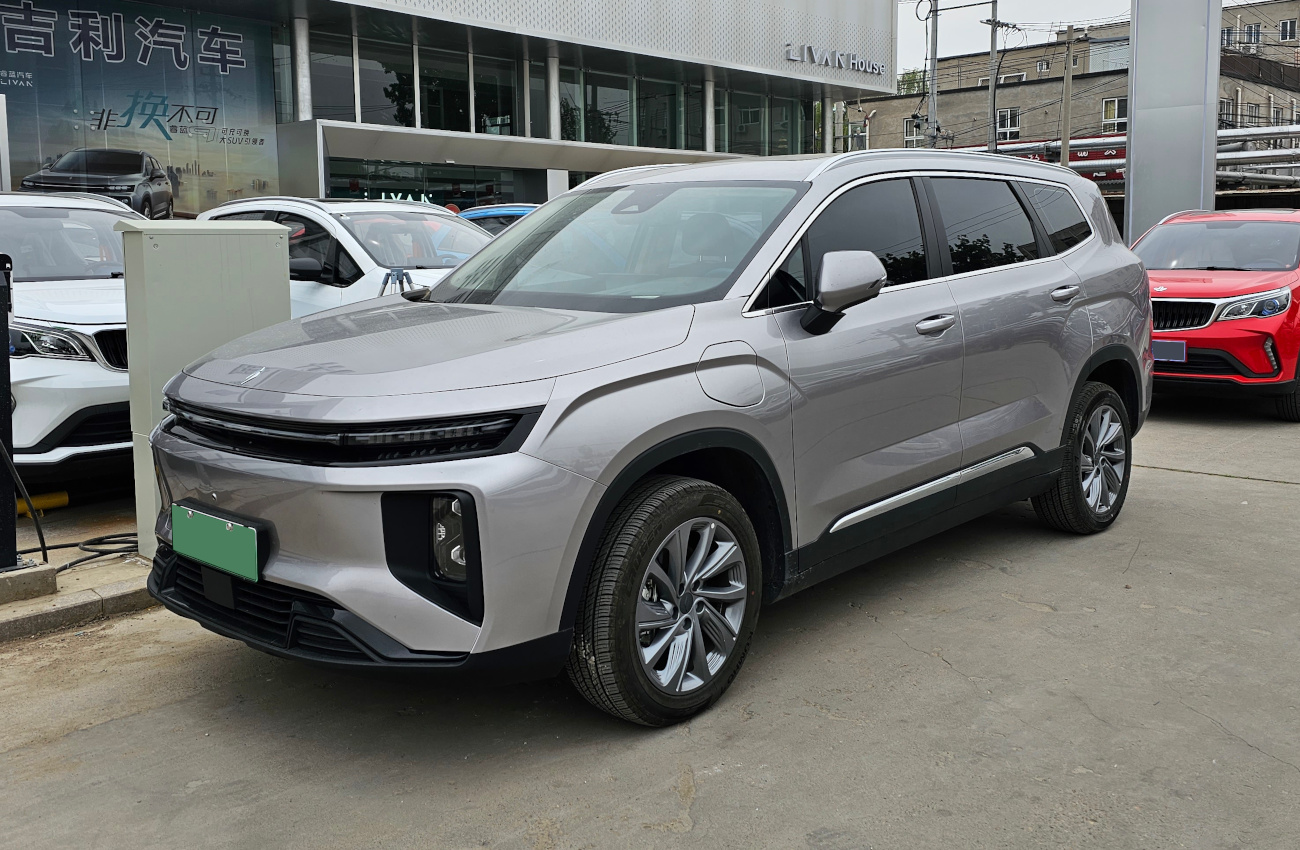
Livan 9

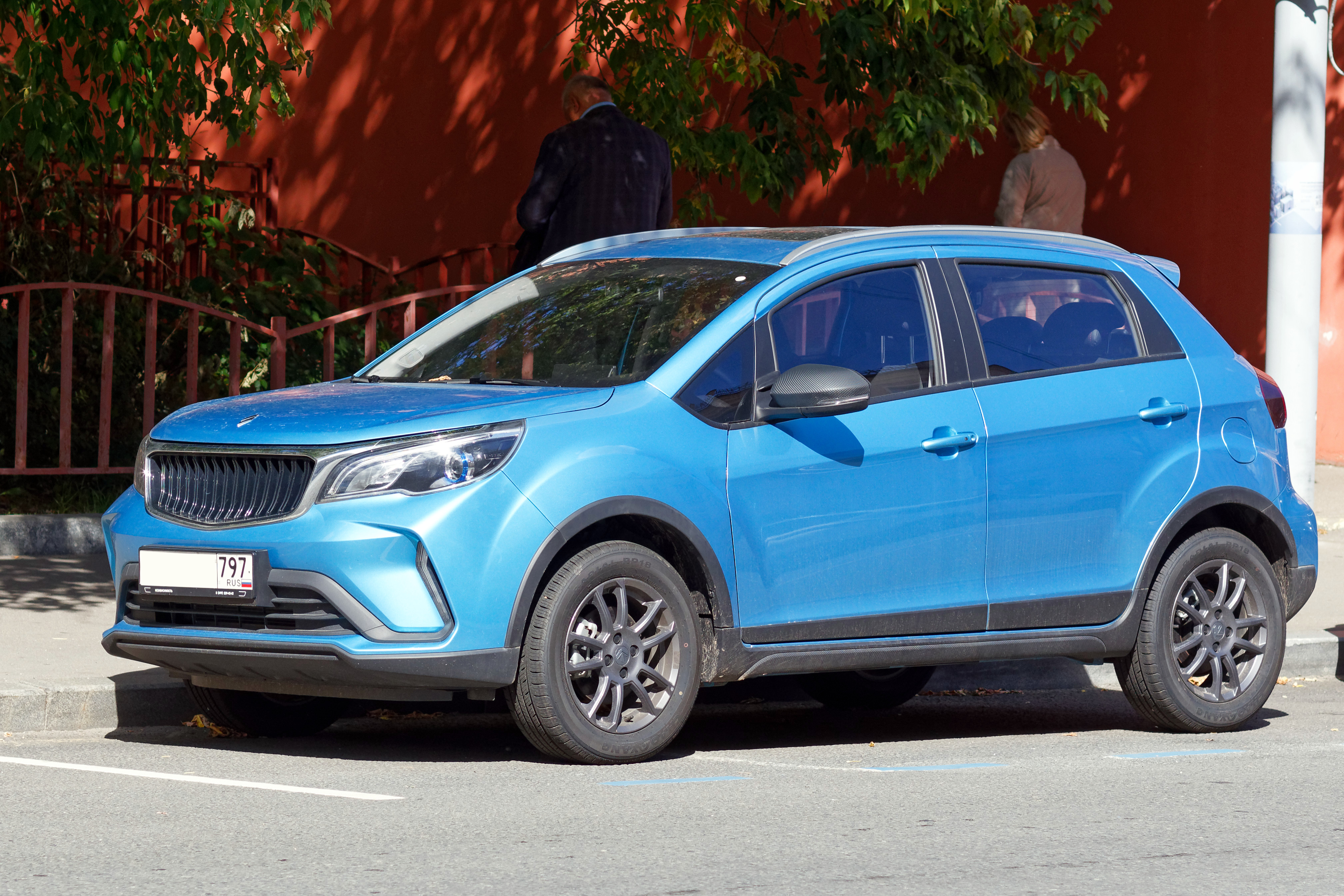
Livan X3 Pro

==== Export models ====
- Livan S6 Pro (2023–present), compact sedan, rebadged Geely Emgrand L
- Livan X6 Pro (2023–present), mid-size SUV, rebadged Geely Haoyue Pro
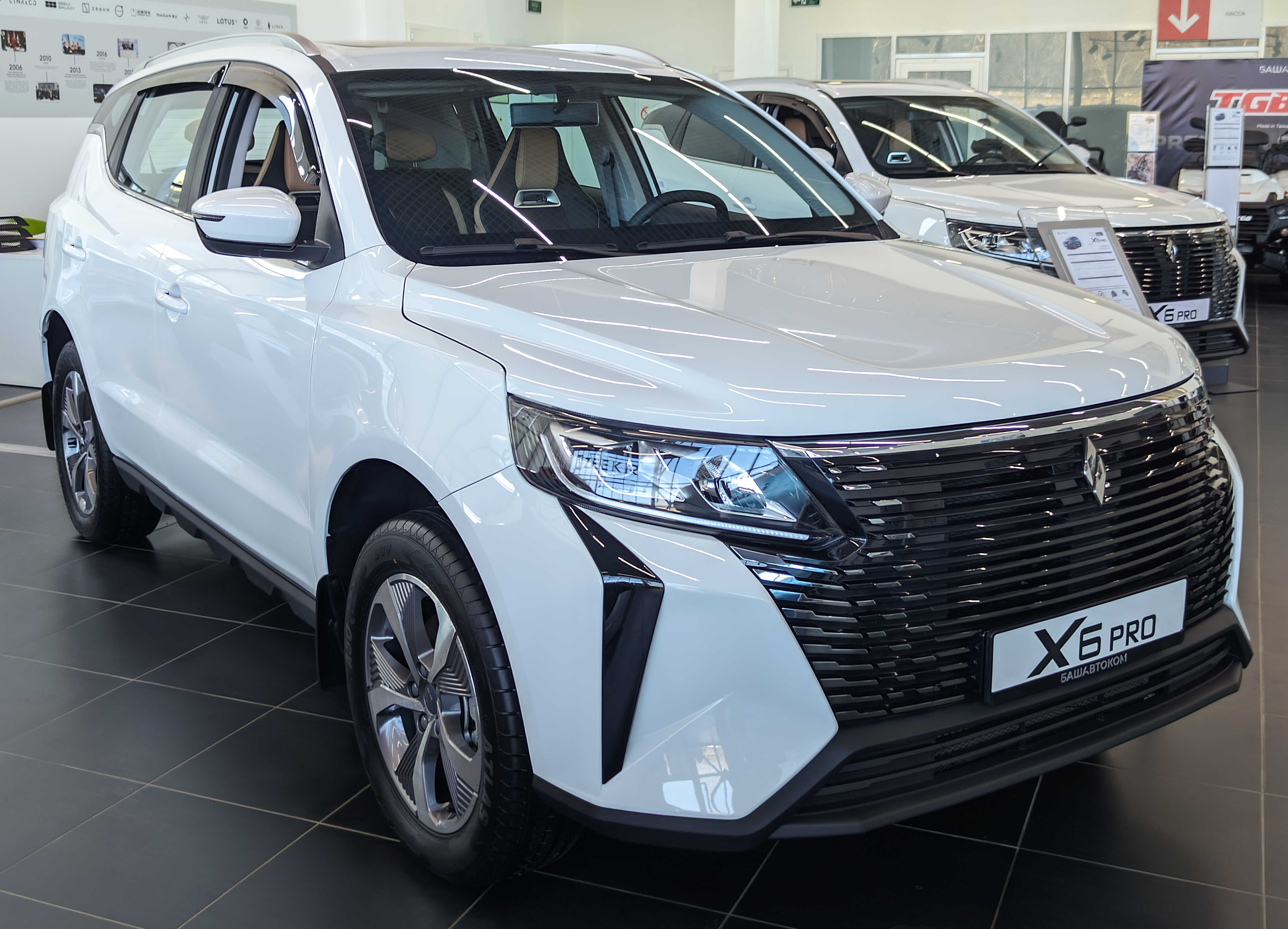
Livan X6 Pro

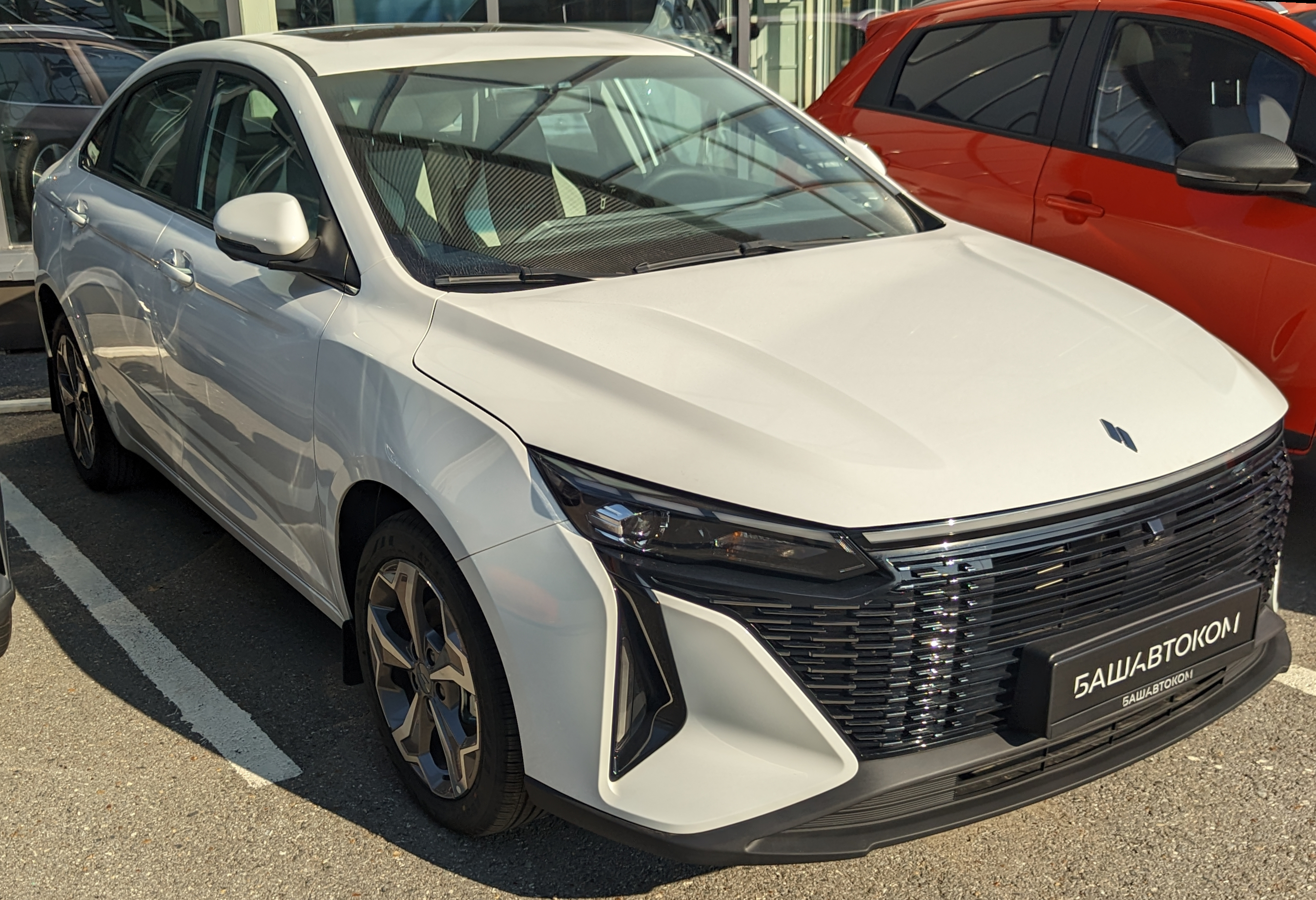
Livan S6 Pro

=== Discontinued models ===
- Maple 30X (2020–2021), subcompact SUV, BEV, rebadged Geely Yuanjing X3
- Maple 60S (2021–2025), compact sedan, rebadged Geely Emgrand EV Pro
- Maple 80V (2020–2025), compact MPV, rebadged BEV variant of Geely Jiaji
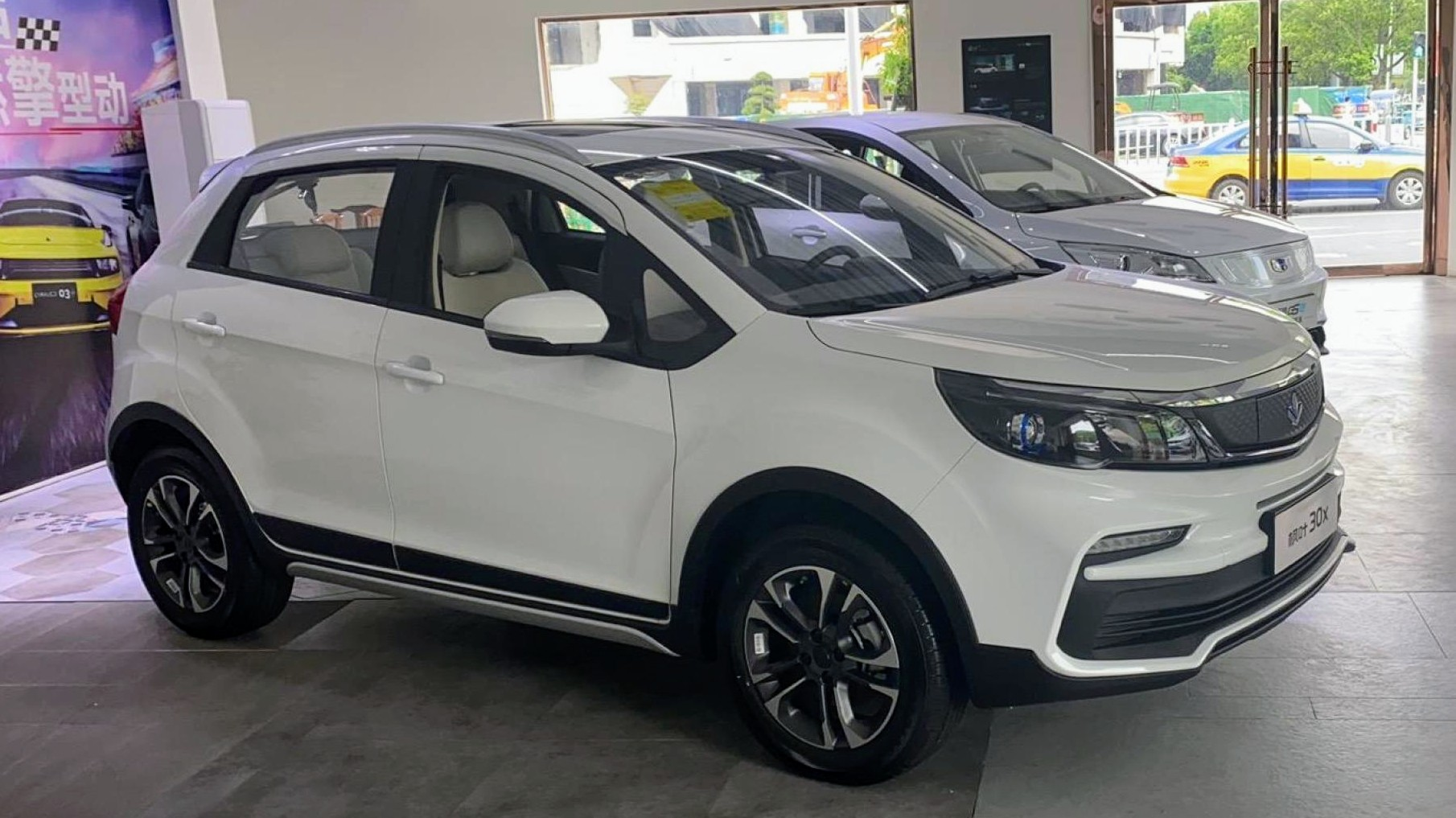
Maple 30X

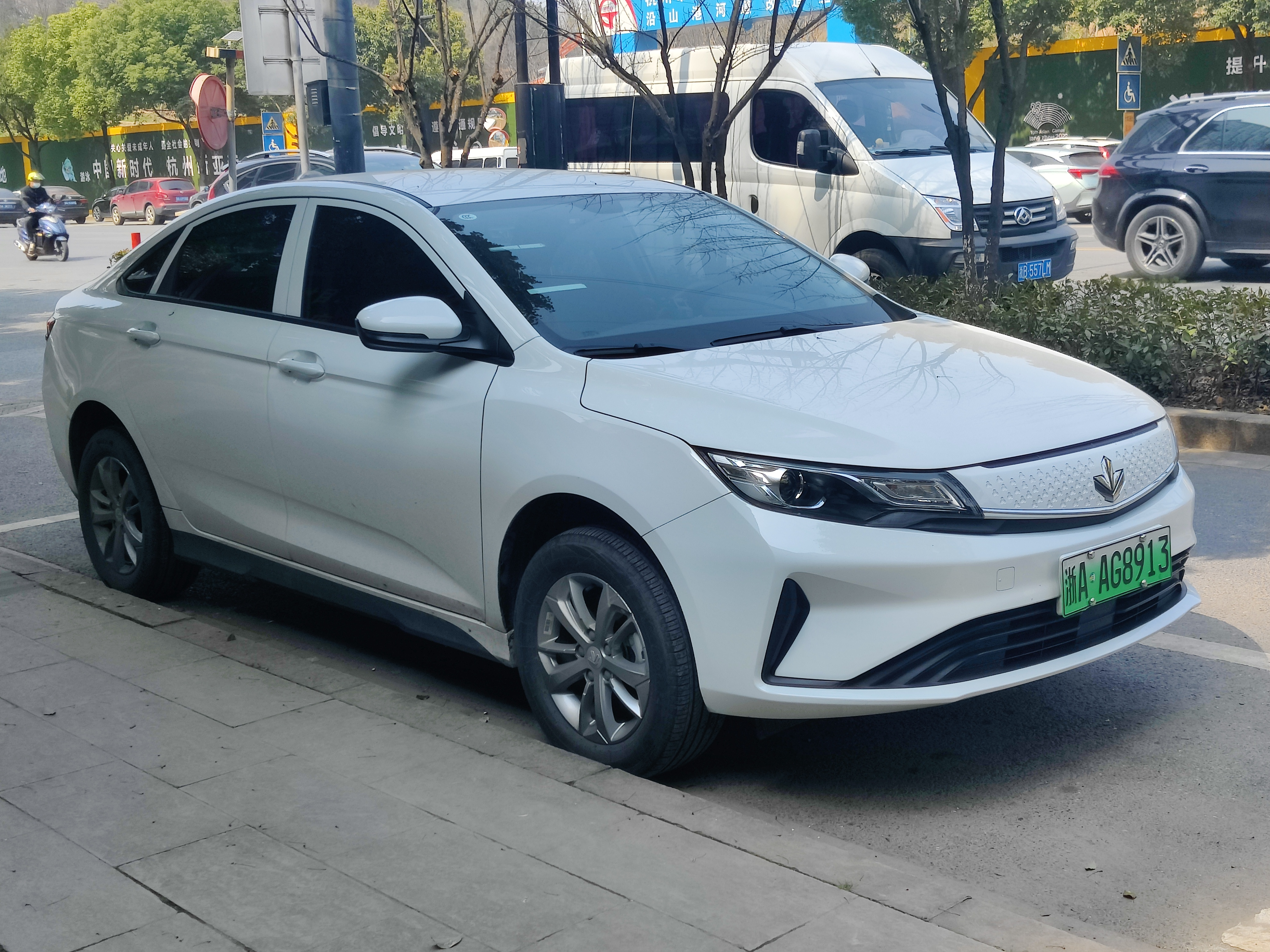
Maple 60S

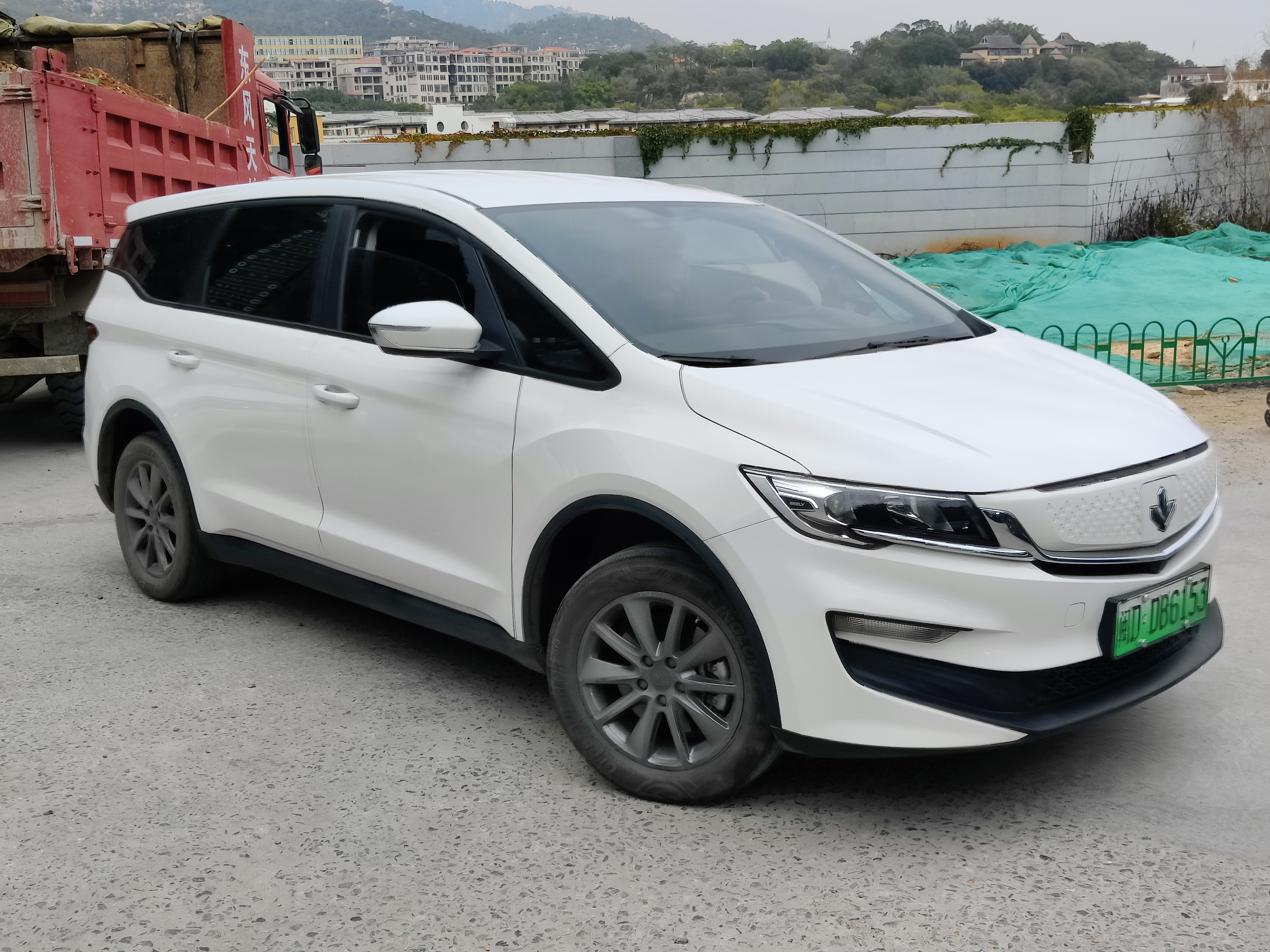
Maple 80V

== See also ==
- Automobile manufacturers and brands of China
- List of automobile manufacturers of China
