= Maple Marindo =

Compact car

Shanghai Maple Marindo
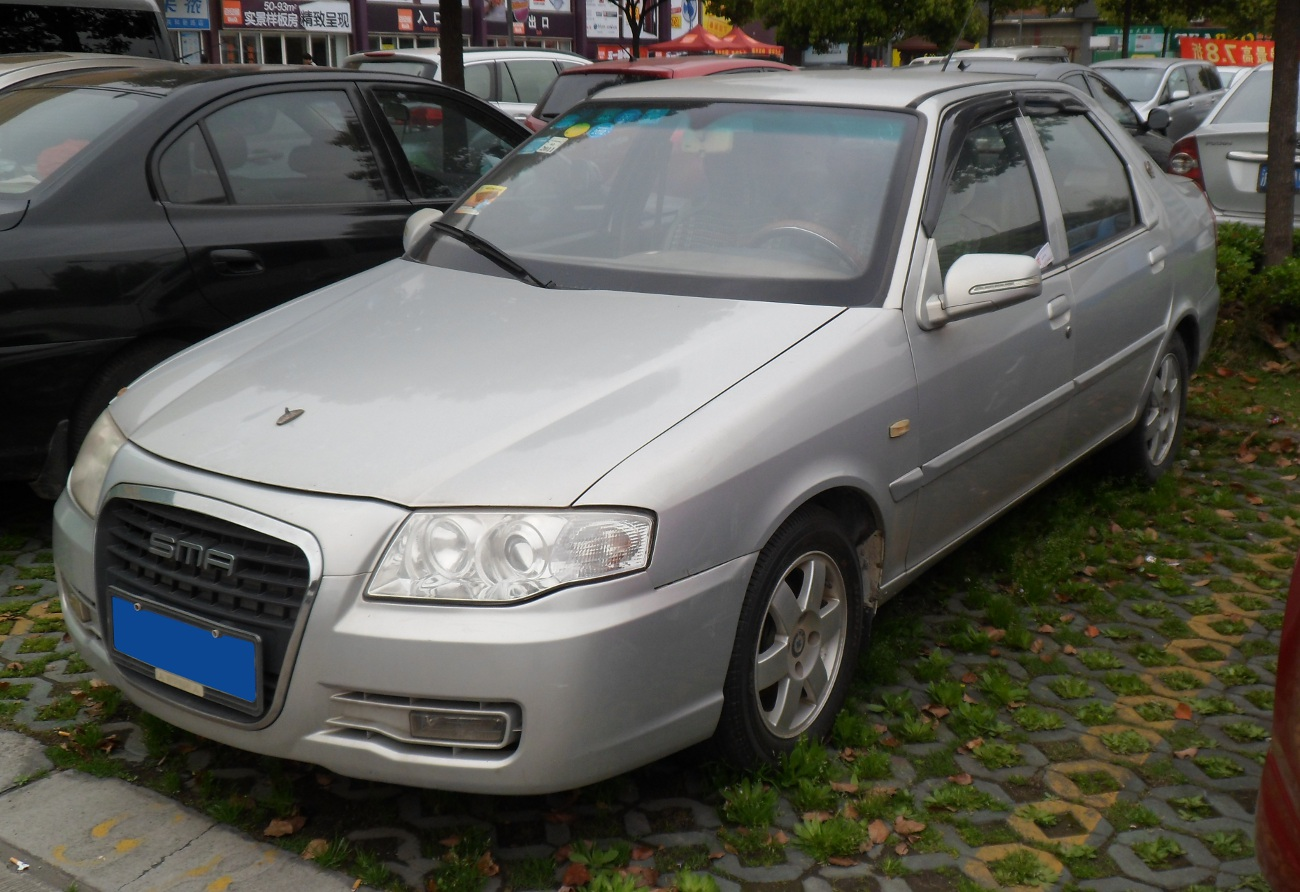

Overview
- Manufacturer: Shanghai Maple
- Also called: SMA Huapu Haifeng; SMA Huapu Haishang
- Production: 2004–2010

Body and chassis
- Body style: 4-door sedan

Powertrain
- Engine: 1.5 L MR479QA I4 (Haifeng); 1.8 L JL481Q I4 (Haishang)
- Transmission: 5 speed manual

Dimensions
- Wheelbase: 2,540 mm (100.0 in)
- Length: 4,490 mm (176.8 in) (Haifeng); 4,435 mm (174.6 in) (Haishang)
- Width: 1,710 mm (67.3 in)
- Height: 1,430 mm (56.3 in)

The Maple Marindo or Haifeng (海锋), Maple Hysoul or Haishang (海尚), and Maple Haiyu (海域) are 4-door compact sedans and 5-door compact liftbacks from Chinese manufacturer, Shanghai Maple, subsidiary of Geely Automobile. It is essentially the sedan version of the Maple Hisoon compact hatchback.

== Shanghai Maple Haiyu ==
The 1.5 L powered Shanghai Maple Haiyu 303 was introduced in 2004,

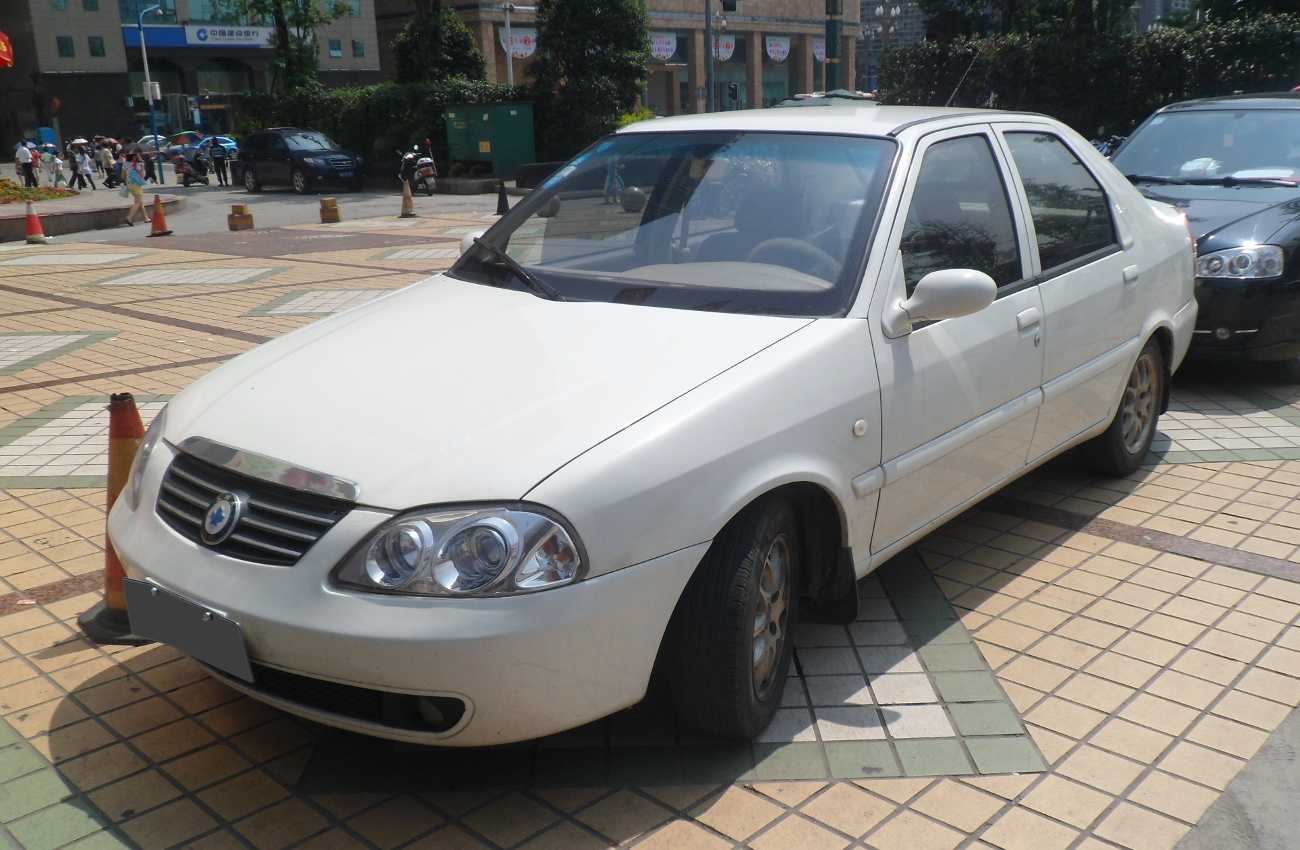
Shanghai Maple Haiyu sedan

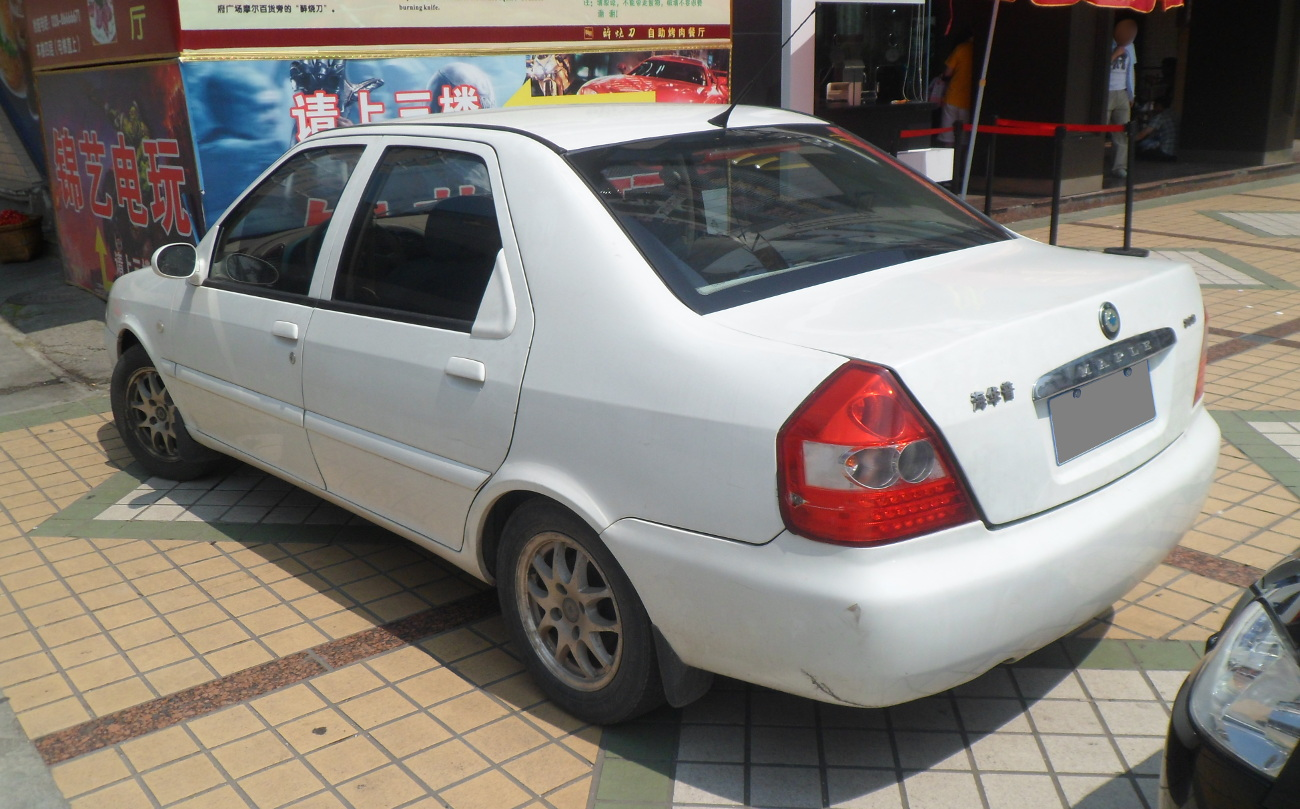
Shanghai Maple Haiyu sedan rear

As of 2005, the Maple Haiyu is available as both a sedan called the MA 303 and hatchback called the AA 205.

== Shanghai Maple Haishang (Hysoul) ==
The 1.8 L powered Shanghai Maple Haishang (海尚) 305 was introduced in 2005. The facelifted model was named the Hysoul, featuring restyled front and rear ends featuring new front fenders, front bumpers, new hood, and new tail lamps. The styling of the front end was heavily inspired by the Audi A4 of the time and the Citroën ZX. The Marindo 305 was shown at the Frankfurt Motor Show in 2005 along with four Geely models.

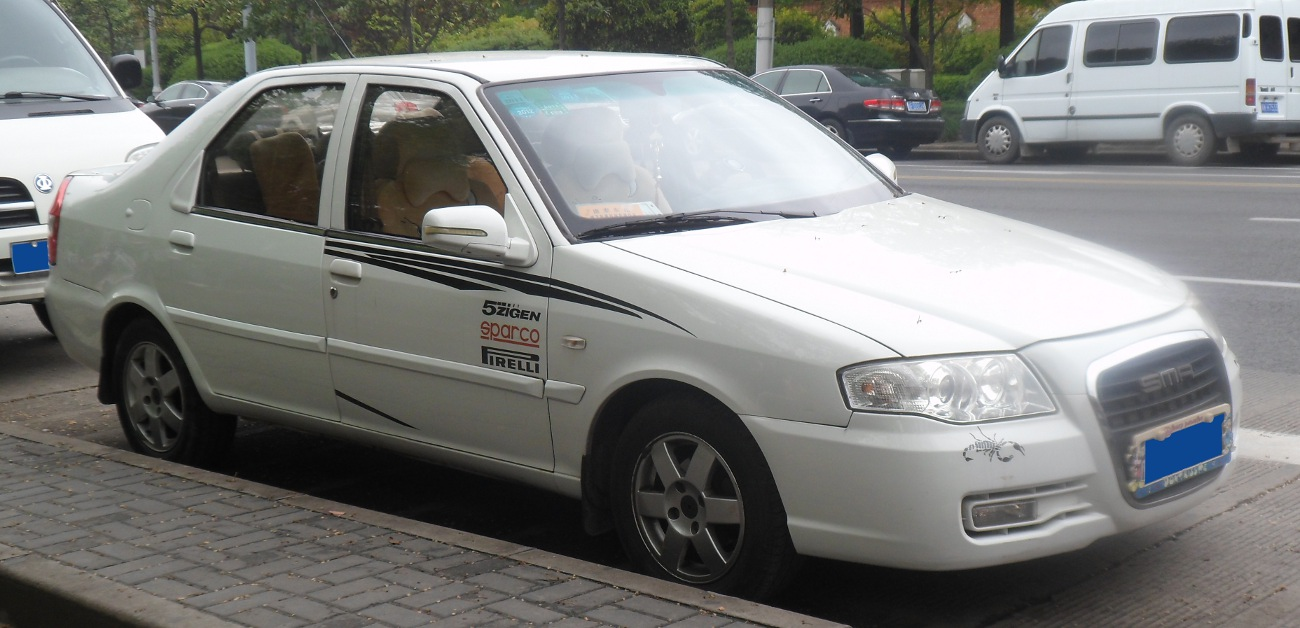
Shanghai Maple Haishang

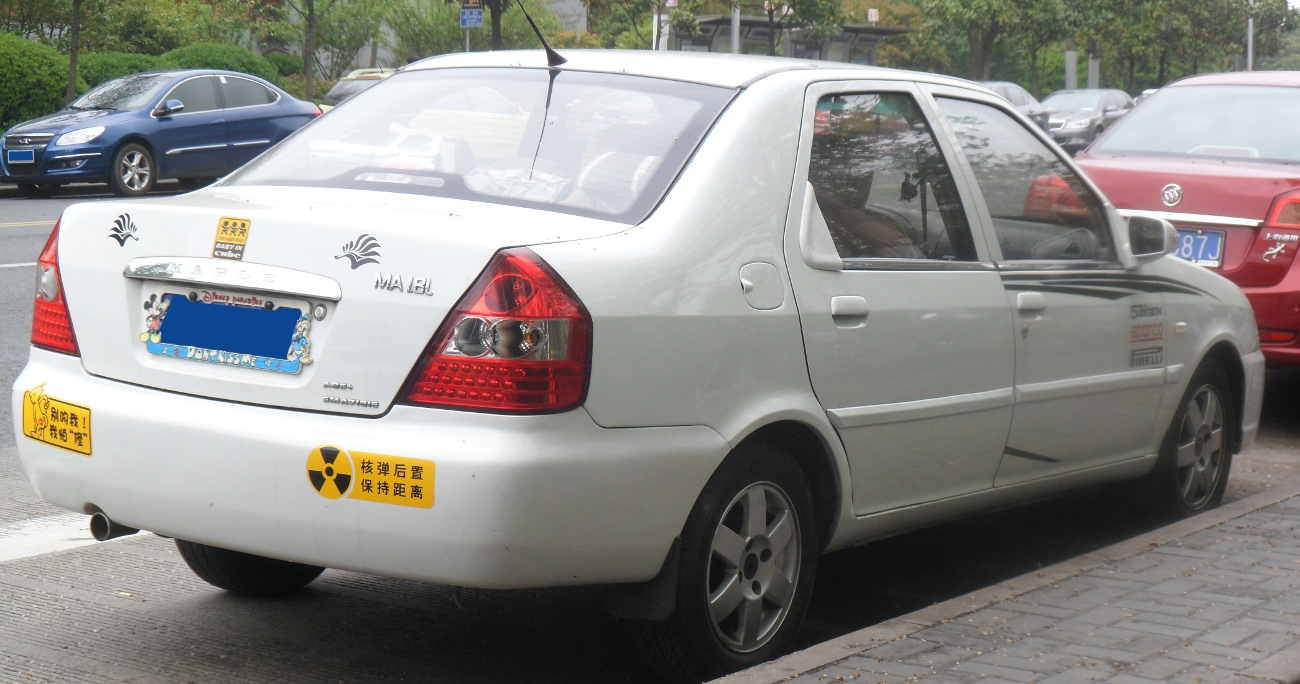
Shanghai Maple Haishang rear

=== Maple Haixuan ===
The Maple Haixuan (海炫) is the hatchback variant of the Hysoul model as they feature the same front end designs. The Haixuan is only available with the 1.5-litre inline-4 engine producing 94hp for the 2006 model year.

== Shanghai Maple Haifeng (Marindo) ==
Based on the Shanghai Maple Hysoul, the Shanghai Maple Haifeng was introduced later featuring restyled front and rear ends featuring new rear fenders, front and rear bumpers, new trunk lid, and new tail lamps. The styling of the rear end was heavily inspired by the first generation Cadillac CTS. Production ended in 2010.

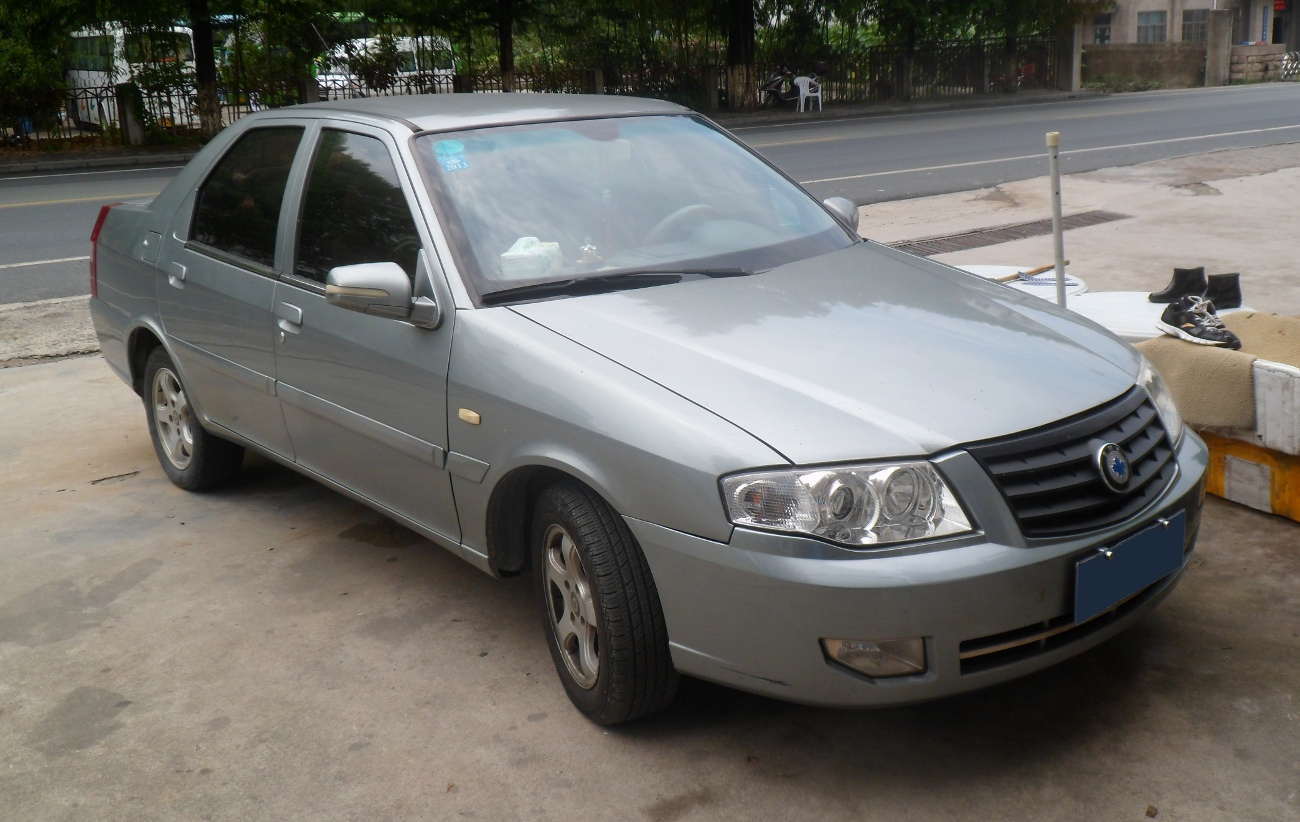
Shanghai Maple Haifeng front

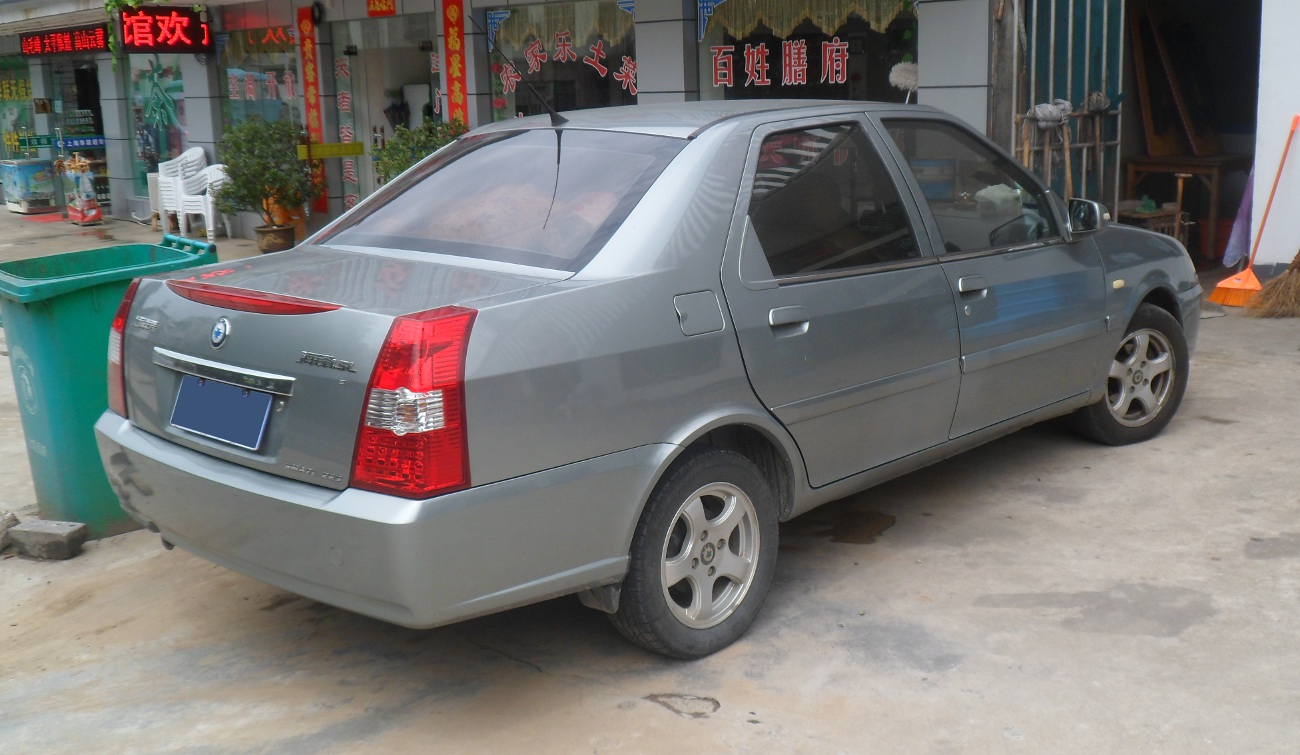
Shanghai Maple Haifeng rear
