= Geely Jiaji =

Compact MPV produced by Geely Auto

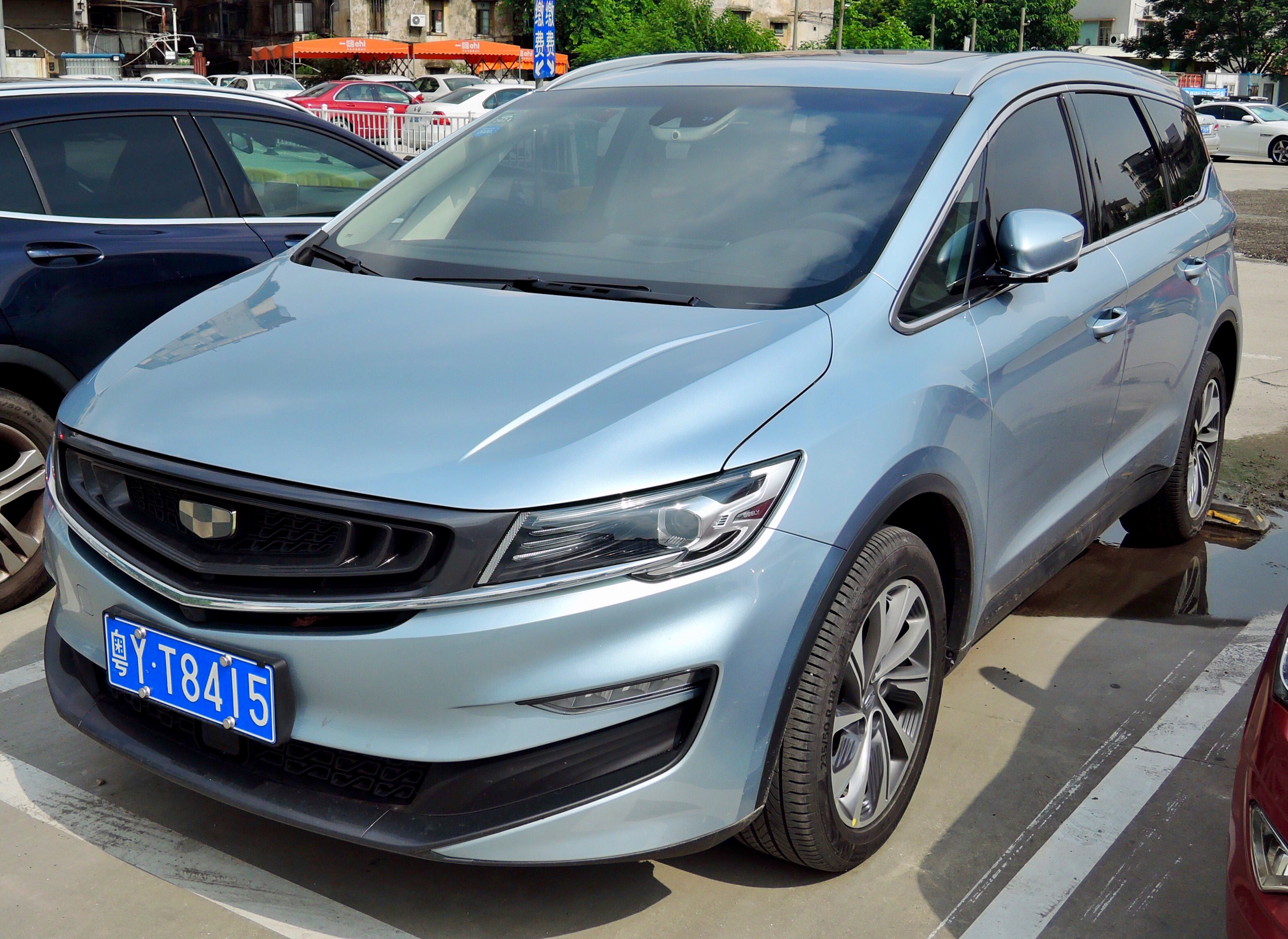

Overview
- Manufacturer: Geely Auto
- Model code: VF11
- Also called: Maple 80V (EV); Livan 8 (EV, 2024–present); Aletra L8 (EV, Indonesia)
- Production: 2019–2025; 2020–present (Electric versions)
- Assembly: China: Guiyang, Guizhou; Indonesia: Purwakarta, West Java (HIM)

Body and chassis
- Class: Compact MPV
- Body style: 5-door MPV
- Layout: Front-engine, front-wheel-drive
- Related: Geely Haoyue

Powertrain
- Engine: Petrol: 1.8 L turbo I4; Petrol plug-in hybrid: 1.5 L I4
- Electric motor: Permanent magnet synchronous
- Transmission: 7-speed DCT; 6-speed manual 6-speed automatic

Dimensions
- Wheelbase: 2,805 mm (110.4 in)
- Length: 4,709 mm (185.4 in); 4,826 mm (190.0 in) (Jiaji L)
- Width: 1,909 mm (75.2 in)
- Height: 1,690 mm (66.5 in); 1,695 mm (66.7 in) (Jiaji L)

The Geely Jiaji (Chinese: 吉利嘉际) is a compact MPV built by Chinese manufacturer Geely Auto as the company's first MPV. The concept named "VF11" was shown at the 2017 Shanghai Auto Show. The Geely Jiaji officially went on sale on 11 March 2019.

== Overview ==
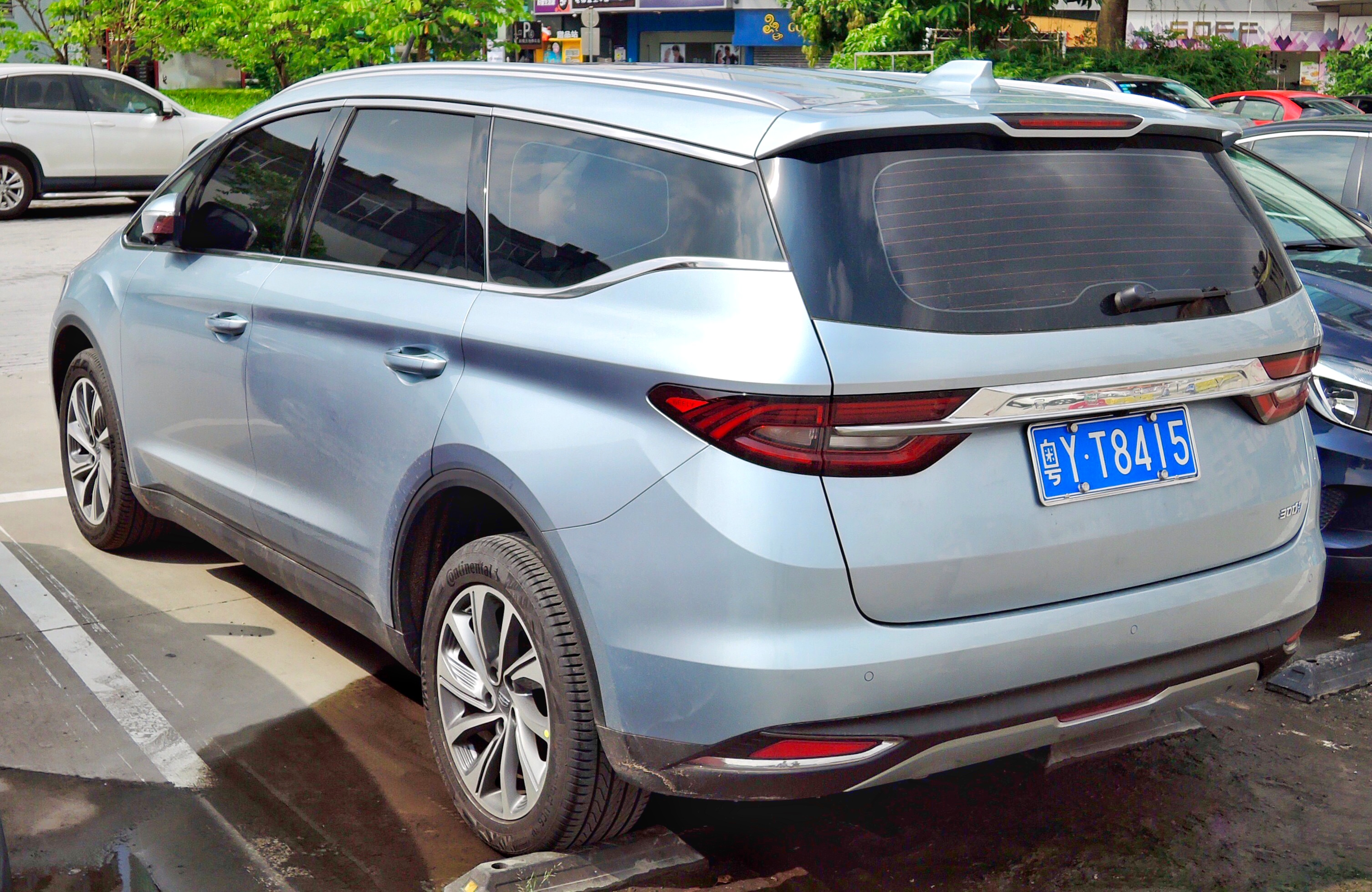
Geely Jiaji rear

Geely Jiaji was named VF11 under development. The Jiaji is the first MPV by the Chinese manufacturer. It is based on a Geely-developed CV platform. As the Jiaji officially went on sale on 11 March, it proved to be a hit with over 3,000 units sold in its first month. The Jiaji provides L2-level automatic driving, intelligence pilot and RCW system.

For the Chinese market, the Geely Jiaji is available with either a 1.5-litre engine with a Plug-in hybrid system or a 1.8-litre turbo engine. The 1.5-litre mild hybrid (MHEV) turbo petrol version Jiaji outputs 190 PS (140 kW; 187 hp) and 300 N⋅m (221 lb⋅ft), powering the front wheels via a 7-speed dual-clutch (DCT) automatic transmission.

=== Jiaji Platinum Edition (2021) ===
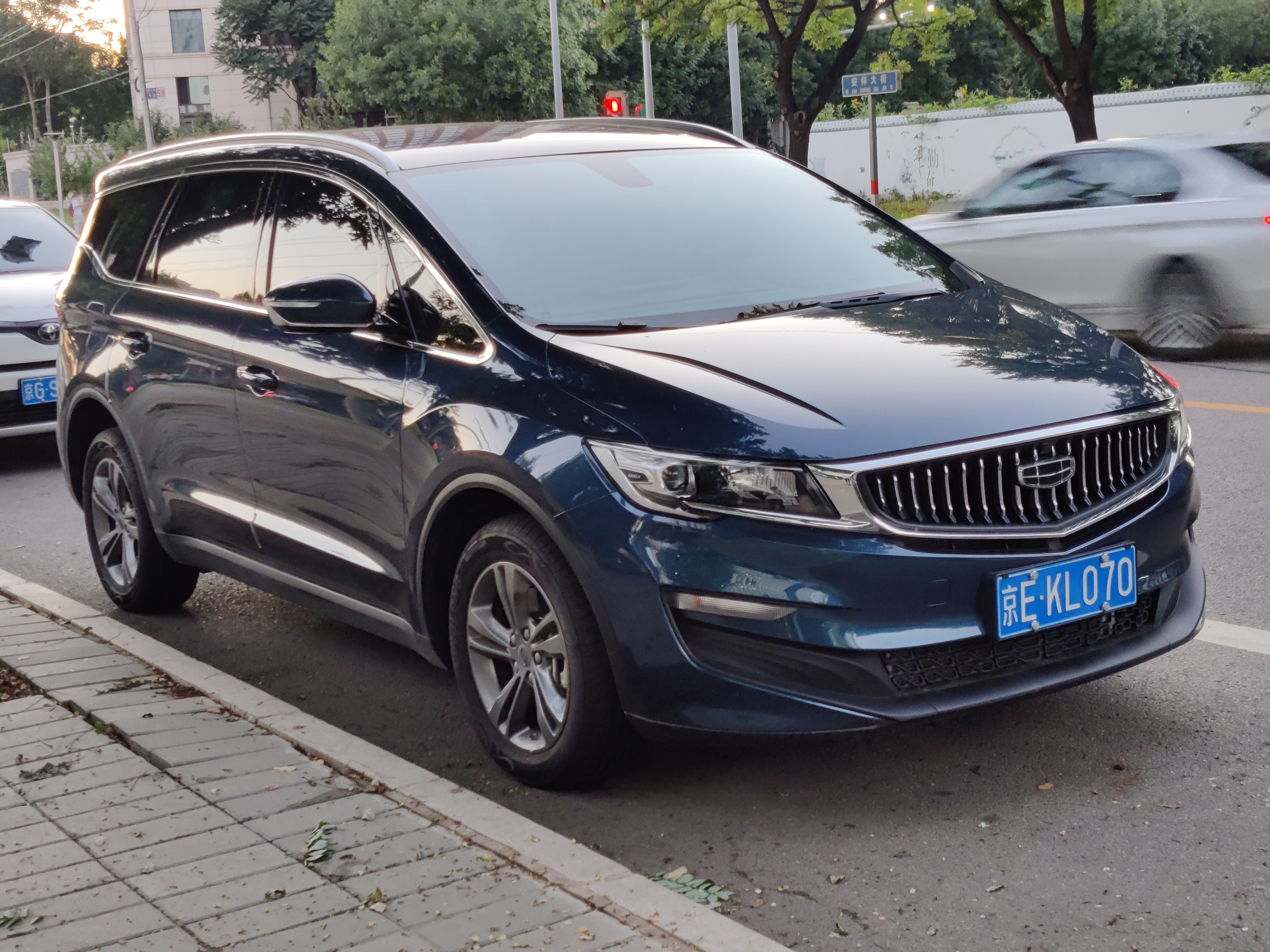
Geely Jiaji Platinum Edition facelift

A facelift variant called the Jiaji Platinum Edition was launched in September 2021 featuring redesigned grilles. The Jiaji Platinum Edition is powered by a 1.8-litre Turbo engine producing 183 hp (136 kW; 186 PS) and 300 N⋅m (221 lb⋅ft) mated to a 7-speed dual-clutch (DCT) automatic transmission.

=== Jiaji L (2022) ===
From late 2022 or the 2023 model year, the Jiaji received a major makeover called the Jiaji L. The Jiaji L is longer at 4,826 mm, a full 120 mm extra compared to the original Jiaji, and has a slightly lower height of 1,695 mm, 5 mm higher compared to the regular Jiaji while retaining the same width at 1,909 mm and wheelbase of 2,805 mm. For the interior, the Jiaji L also received an updated Galaxy OS infotainment system powered by Geely's E02 system-on-chip while still retaining a 12.3-inch touchscreen, with the digital instrument cluster upgraded from seven inches to a 10.25-inch unit. The centre console of the Jiaji L features a simpler design with a longer covered storage cubby with a restyled gear lever, an electronic parking brake, and drive mode selector arranged in a single unit located ahead of an elevated arm rest with additional storage under a tilt-up lid. Seating layouts remains to be in 2-2-2 and 2-3-2 configurations.

The Jiaji L powertrain is a 1.5-litre turbocharged four-cylinder engine that makes 178 hp (133 kW; 180 PS) at 5,500 rpm and 290 N⋅m (214 lb⋅ft) of torque from 2,000 to 3,500 rpm. The engine is paired with a 7-speed wet dual-clutch transmission with front wheel drive across the range. Geely claims a WLTC-rated fuel consumption of 6.9 L/100 km (34 mpg_{‑US}; 41 mpg_{‑imp}) and top speed of 190 km/h (118 mph).

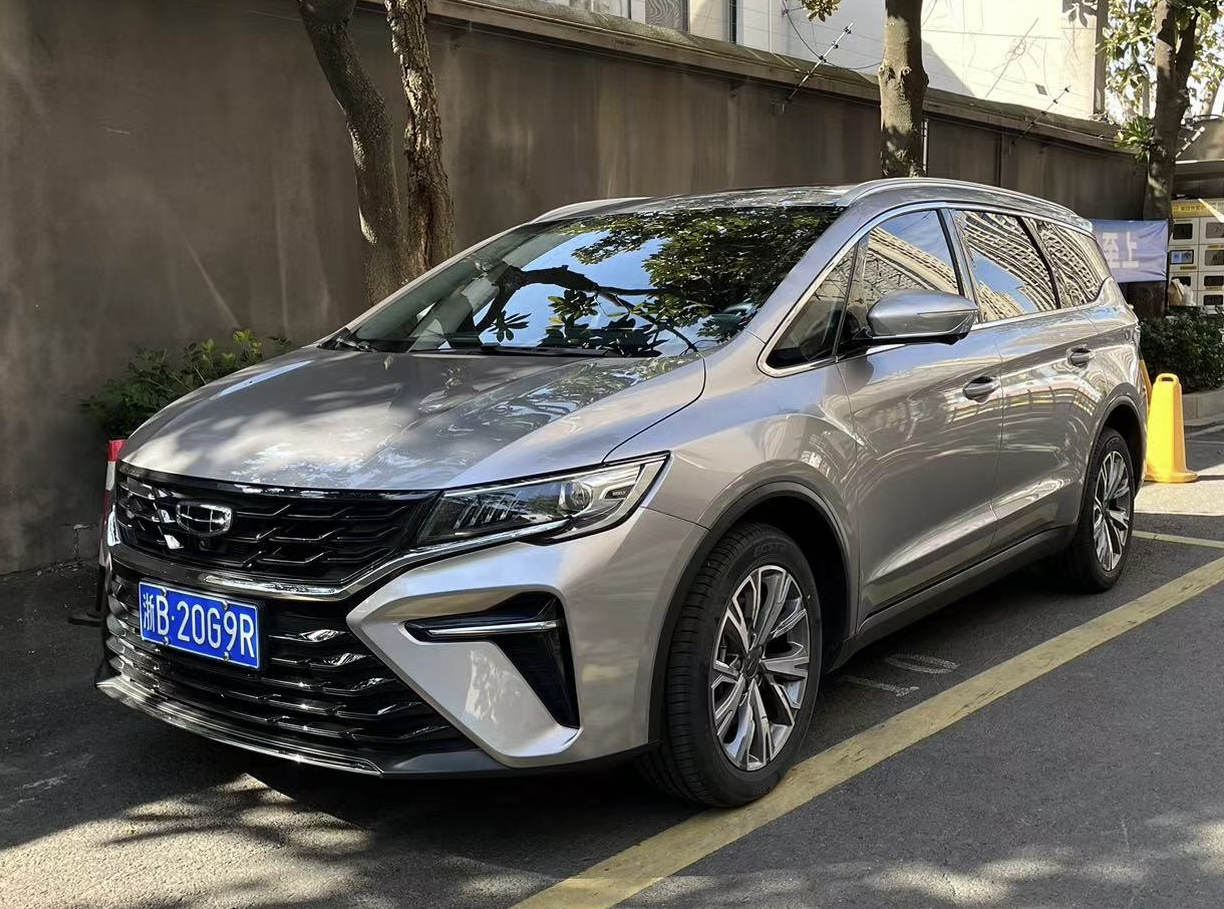
Geely Jiaji L front

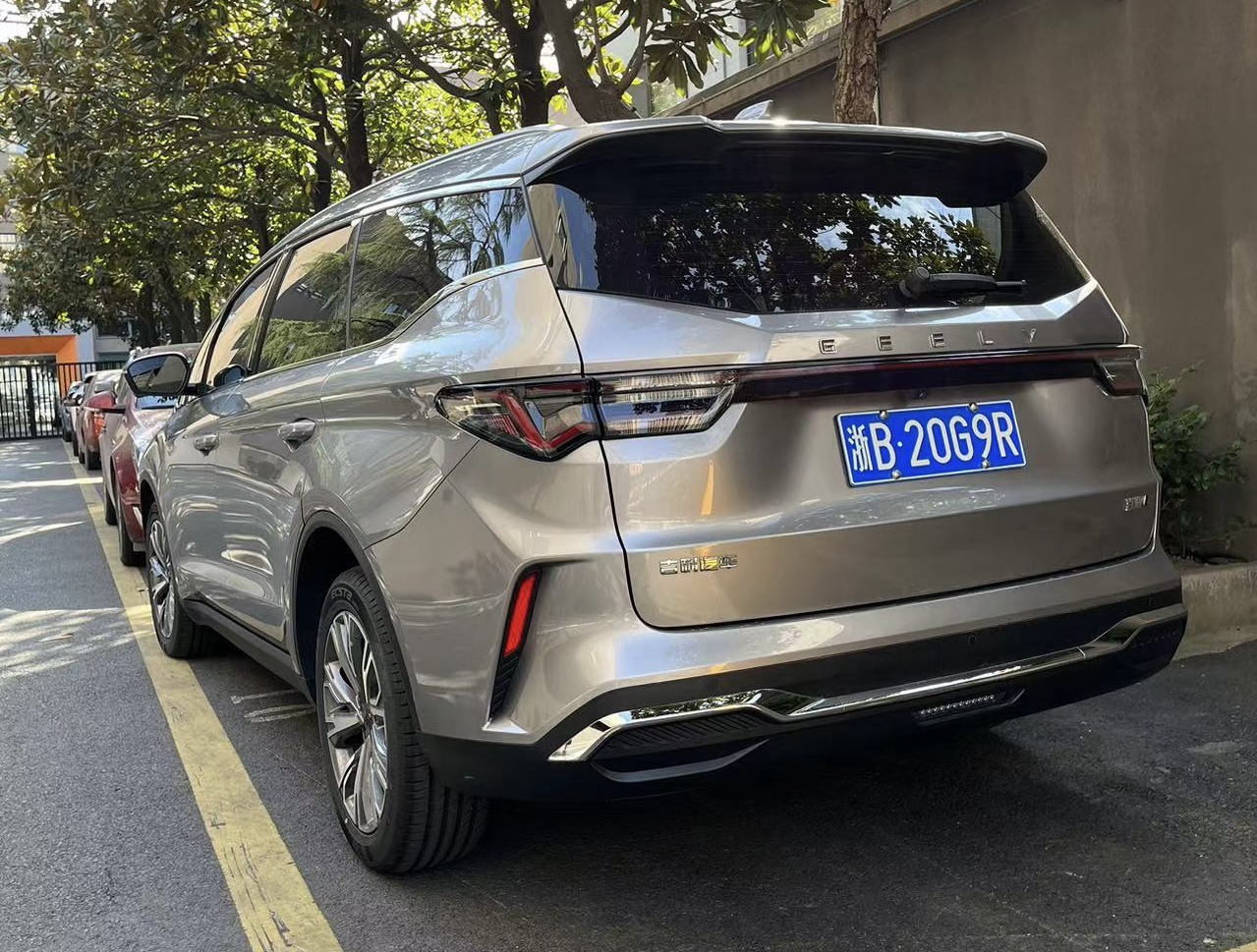
Geely Jiaji L rear

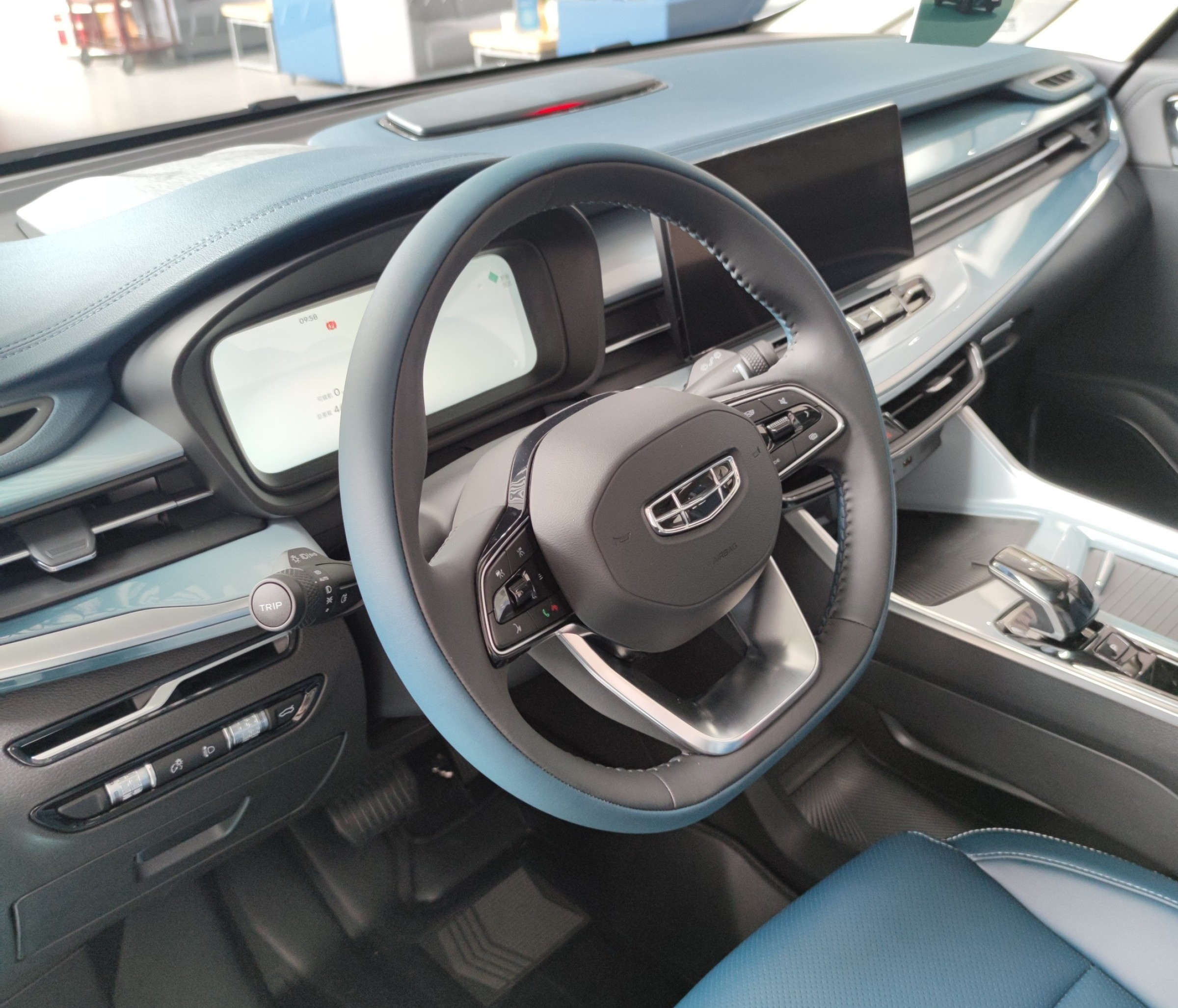
Geely Jiaji L interior

=== Technology ===
The multimedia system provides a 12.3-inch touchscreen and is able to activate and control all systems in the car. The GKUI infotainment system also includes features such as 360-degree surround view camera, voice command to control windows and sunroof, natural voice recognition and 4G connectivity with online music streaming services. In plug-in hybrid models, there is also a key which infers users the electric vehicle settings. Some models provides Geely Full LED System. Jiaji also carries three types of power sources.

	Petrol	Plug-in Hybrid
Engines	1.8T 184 hp (137 kW; 187 PS) petrol	1.5T 177 hp (132 kW; 179 PS) petrol
Maximum power output	135 kW (181 hp; 184 PS)	130 kW (174 hp; 177 PS)
Peak torque	300 N⋅m (221 lb⋅ft)	255 N⋅m (188 lb⋅ft)
Electric motor power	—	140 kW (188 hp; 190 PS)

Petrol models carry a 1.8 inline-4 turbo engine and a 6-speed automatic gearbox. There are four valves per cylinder. All models feature optional seating for either 6 or 7 passengers with the 6-seater having second row captain's chairs. Electronic parking brake and electronic gear shifter are standard across the range with the exception of the base 1.5T with 6-speed manual.

== Electric versions ==
=== Maple 80V EV ===
The Maple 80V EV sold under Maple brand and later under Livan is based on the Geely Jiaji with the exterior body being essentially a rebadge of the Geely MPV. The Maple 80V is Maple's second model. It is Geely's first product to feature replaceable batteries and can replace batteries at battery swap stations. In terms of power, the NMC battery pack of the Maple 80V comes from Hefei Guoxuan High-Tech. The motor of the 80V has a rated power of 40 kW (54 hp; 54 PS) and a maximum speed of 130 km/h (81 mph).

During the 2020 China International Intelligent Industry Expo, Geely Technology Group released the battery swap stations. Geely announced that it plans to complete 35 battery swap stations in Chongqing in 2020, and more than 200 battery swap stations will be completed in Chongqing by 2023.

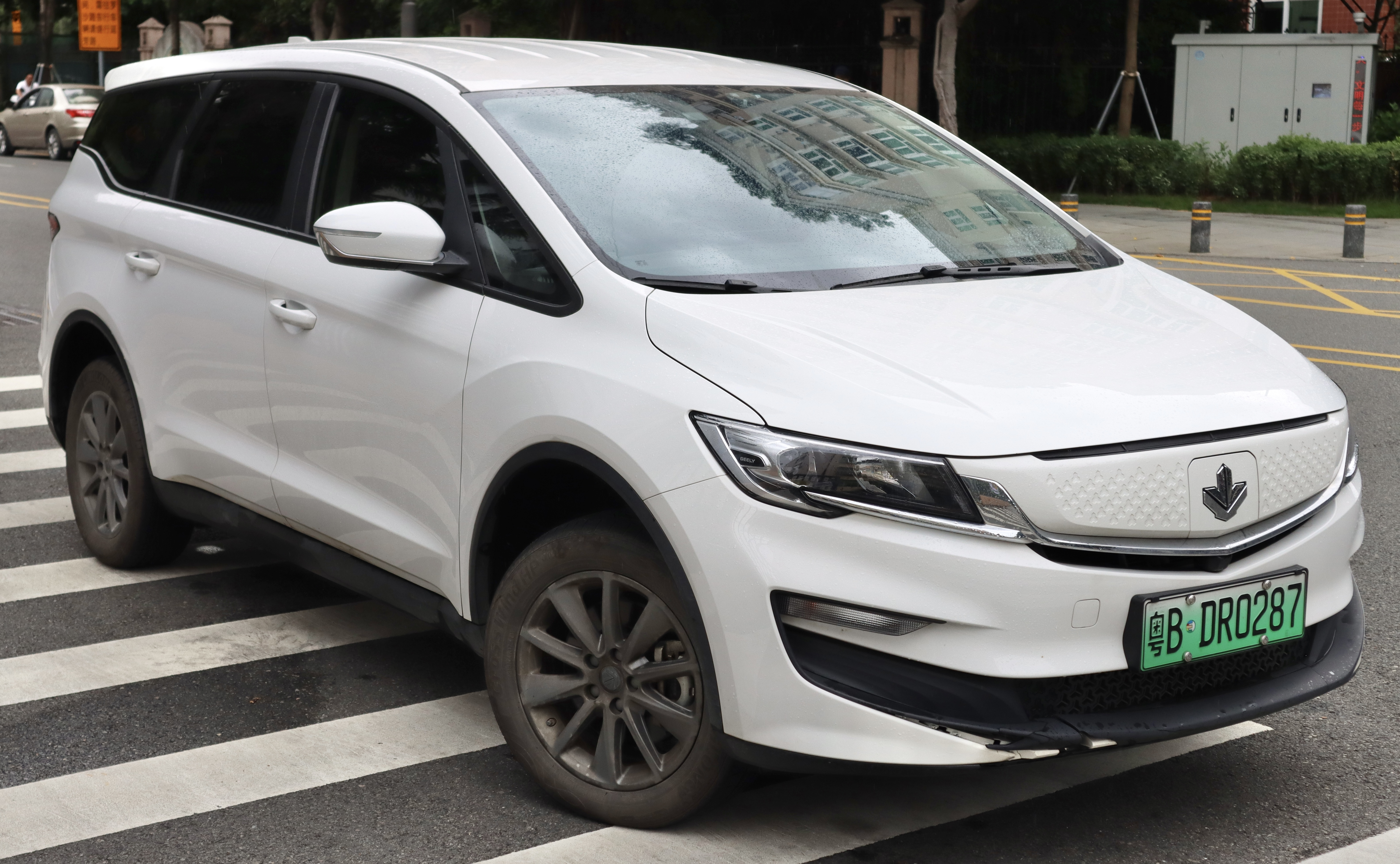
Maple 80V

=== Livan 8 ===
Based on the Geely Jiaji L, the Livan 8 is Livan's first global model. The Livan 8 was unveiled at Auto Guangzhou 2024. The Livan 8 is positioned as an all-electric 7-seater MPV. It is available as a standard-range model (50.4 kWh) capable of a 407 km (253 mi) range and as a long-range model (64.7 kWh) offering a range of 515 km (320 mi).

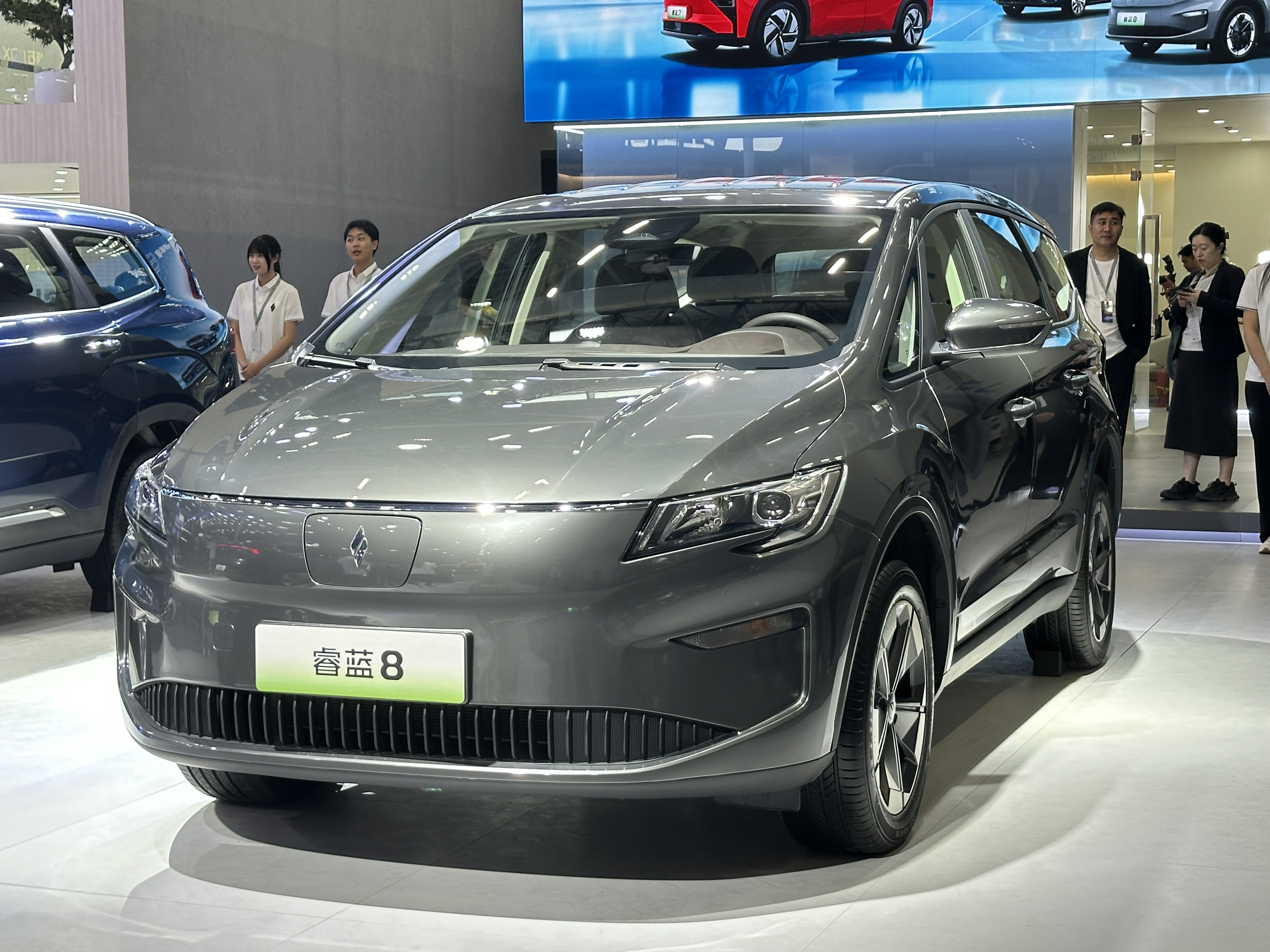
Livan 8 front

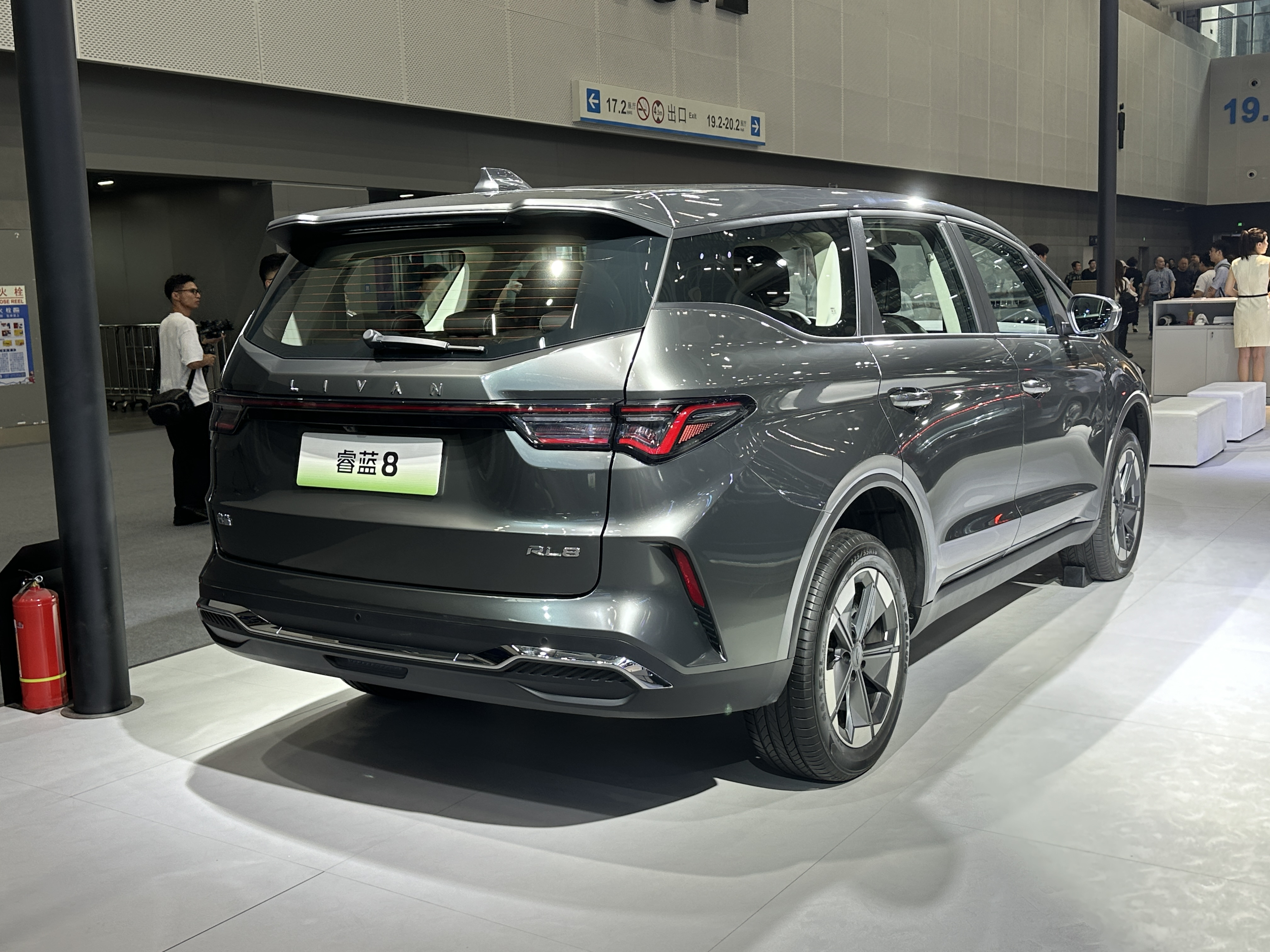
Livan 8 rear

==== Aletra L8 EV ====
As a result of a joint venture between Livan Automotive and Sinar Armada Globalindo (SAG), the Livan 8 is marketed in Indonesia under the Aletra brand as the Aletra L8 EV. It was revealed in November 2024 at the 3rd Gaikindo Jakarta Auto Week as Aletra's first model. The L8 consist of two variants with differing battery packs; Short Range (L8) and Long Range (L8S). Local assembly of the L8 EV in Indonesia at the Handal Indonesia Motor plant commenced in May 2025.

== Sales ==
Year	China		
Year	Jiaji	Jiaji PHEV	Maple 80V
2019	32,961		
2020	28,772		
2021	12,178		
2022	6,933		
2023	2,669	385	2,005
2024	1,847	1	1,065
2025	959	—	1,775
