= Geely GX9 =

Mid-size crossover SUV

Geely GX9 Haoqing
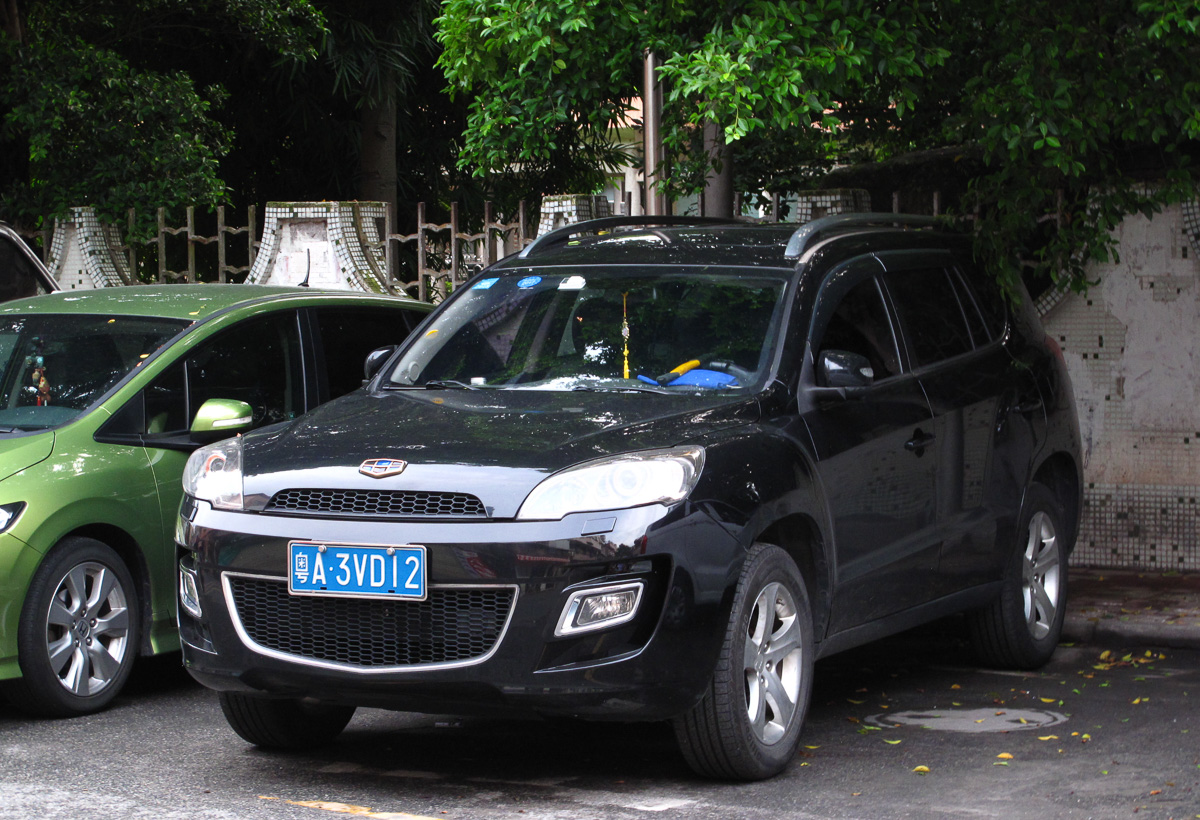
- Geely GX9 Haoqing in Guangzhou

Overview
- Manufacturer: Geely Auto
- Also called: Emgrand EX8
- Production: 2014–2017
- Assembly: China: Ningbo, Zhejiang

Body and chassis
- Class: Mid-size SUV
- Body style: 5-door crossover SUV
- Layout: Front-engine, front-wheel-drive or all-wheel-drive
- Platform: Geely CV
- Related: Geely Vision X6

Powertrain
- Engine: Petrol: 1.5 L 3G15TDB G-Power turbo I3; 1.8 L 4G18TDB G-Power turbo I4
- Transmission: 7-speed dual-clutch

Dimensions
- Wheelbase: 2,800 mm (110.2 in)
- Length: 4,839 mm (190.5 in)
- Width: 1,880 mm (74.0 in)
- Height: 1,715 mm (67.5 in)

Chronology
- Successor: Geely Haoyue

The Geely GX9 is a mid-size SUV produced by the Chinese automaker Geely Auto.

== Overview ==
The GX9 is Geely's first 7-seater crossover and it was originally previewed as a concept in 2009, and was called the Emgrand EX8 in 2010, then renamed to Geely GX9 in 2014 and finally reached the market as Haoqing SUV. The GX9 was shown during the Shanghai Autoshow in 2013 as the Emgrand EX8 semi-concept, and production started in early 2014 as the GX9 of Geely after being unveiled during the 2014 Beijing Autoshow. The final production car has prices ranging from 100,000 to 150,000 yuan. The Geely GX9 SUV achieved a five star result in the C-NCAP crash test.

=== Powertrain ===
Power of the Geely GX9 comes from a 2.4 petrol engine or a 2.0 turbodiesel engine for export. The four-cylinder gasoline engine produces a maximum 162 hp and 210 nm, mated to a six-speed automatic transmission or a 5-speed manual transmission.

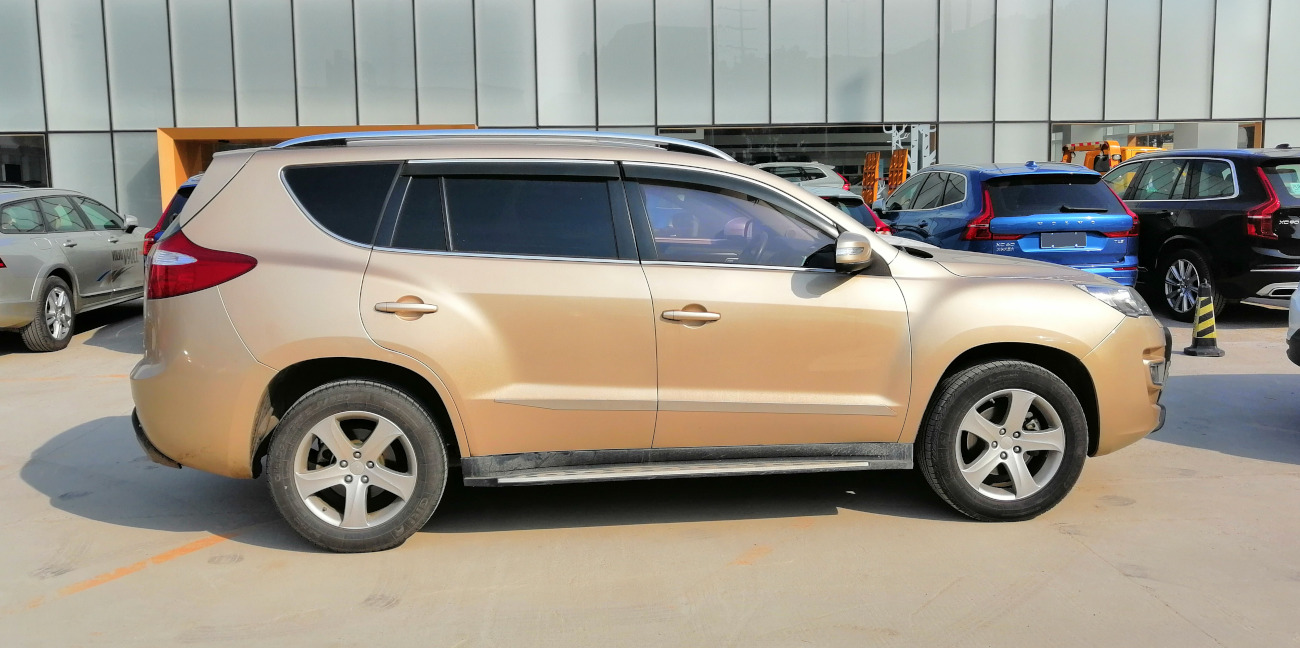
Side view

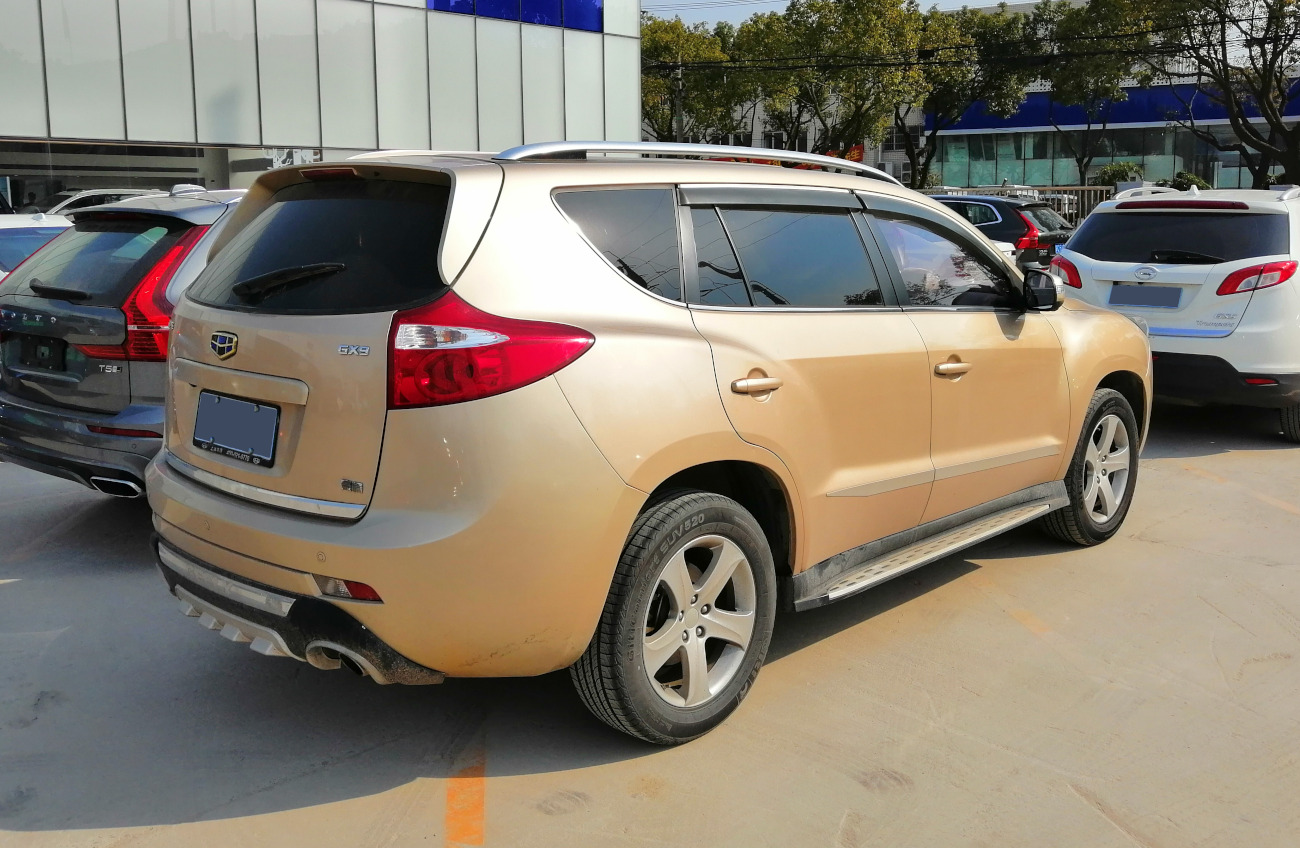
Rear view
