= Geely Yuanjing X6 =

Compact crossover SUV

Geely Haoyue Pro
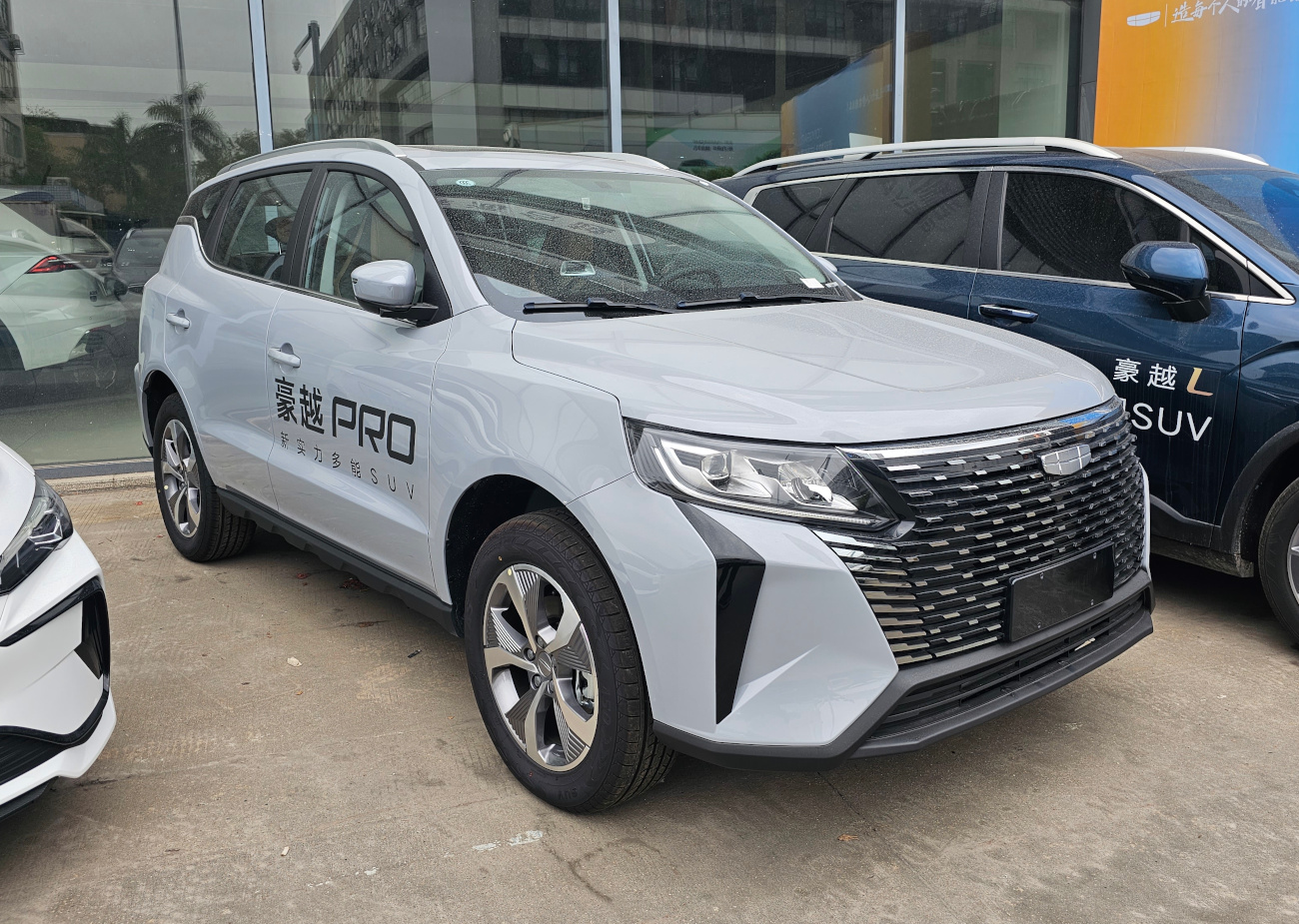

Overview
- Manufacturer: Geely Auto
- Also called: Gleagle GX7 (2012–2015); Geely GX7 (2015–2016); Geely Emgrand GX7; Englon SX7; Geely Yuanjing X6 (2016–2024); Livan X6 Pro (2024–present); EMC 7 (Italy, 2025–present)
- Production: 2012–present

Body and chassis
- Class: Compact SUV
- Body style: 5-door crossover SUV
- Layout: Front-engine, front-wheel-drive
- Platform: Geely NL
- Related: Geely GX9

The Geely Haoyue Pro or the Geely Vision X6, or the Gleagle GX7 is a compact crossover SUV produced by Chinese auto maker Geely Auto. Since its launch in 2012, this model series has undergone multiple renamings and rebrandings.

Originally launched as the Gleagle GX7 under the Gleagle brand and then as the Shanghai Englon SX7 under the Shanghai Englon brand of Geely in 2012 as first generation. The vehicle was relaunched as the Geely GX7 after the Gleagle brand was discontinued.

The second generation, codename NL-4 was launched in 2016 and renamed the vehicle to Geely Vision X6 as the flagship of the Geely Vision series.

The third generation codename NC31 was launched in 2024 renamed the vehicle again to Geely Haoyue Pro, or Livan X6 Pro in export markets such as Russia.

== First generation (GX7; 2012) ==
Geely GX7
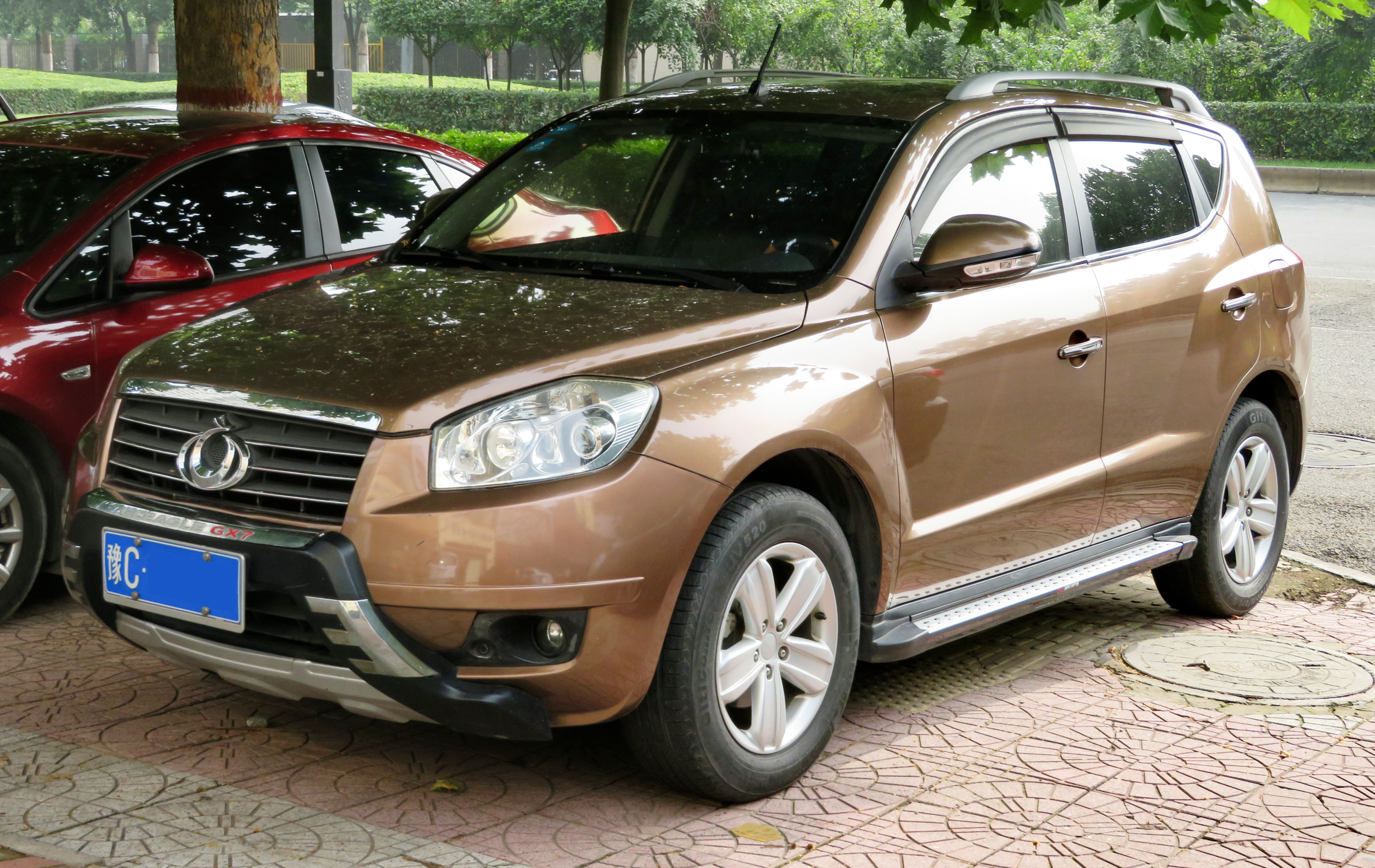
- 2013 Gleagle GX7

Overview
- Also called: Gleagle GX7; Geely Emgrand X7; Geely Emgrand GX7; Englon SX7
- Production: 2012–2016
- Model years: 2012–2016
- Assembly: China: Chengdu; Belarus: Barysaw

Powertrain
- Engine: 1.4 L JLB-4G14TB turbo I4; 1.8 L 4G18 I4; 2.0 L 4G63 I4; 2.4 L 4G64 I4
- Transmission: 5-speed manual 6-speed manual 6 speed automatic 8-speed CVT

Dimensions
- Wheelbase: 2,661 mm (104.8 in)
- Length: 4,500 mm (177.2 in)-4,546 mm (179.0 in)
- Width: 1,840 mm (72.4 in)
- Height: 1,700 mm (66.9 in)
- Curb weight: 1,514–1,310 kg (3,338–2,888 lb)

In 2012 the Gleagle GX7 was launched, and it was officially introduced to the market on March 3, 2014. When the Gleagle sub-brand was shut down in 2015, the name was changed to Geely GX7.

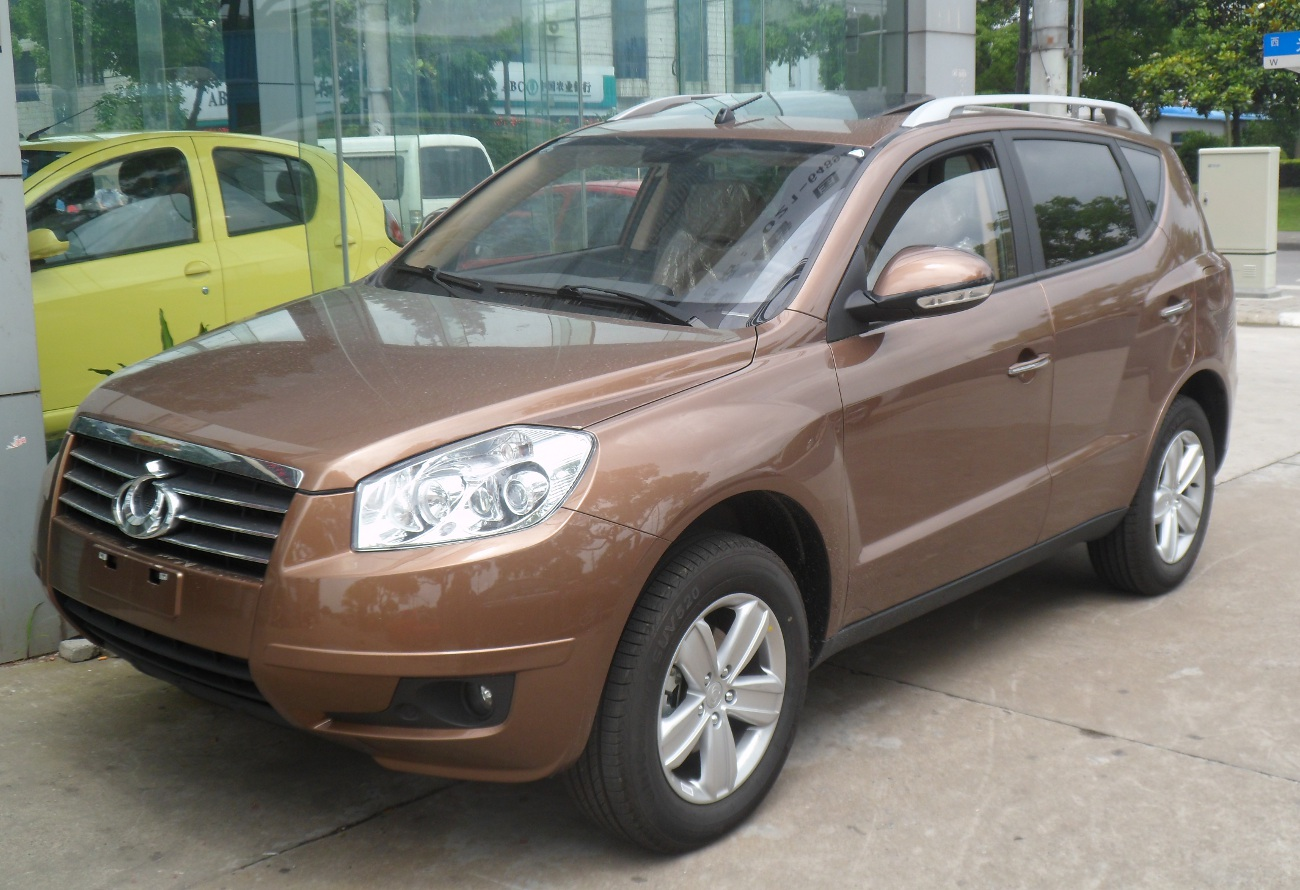
Pre-facelift Gleagle GX7 (front)

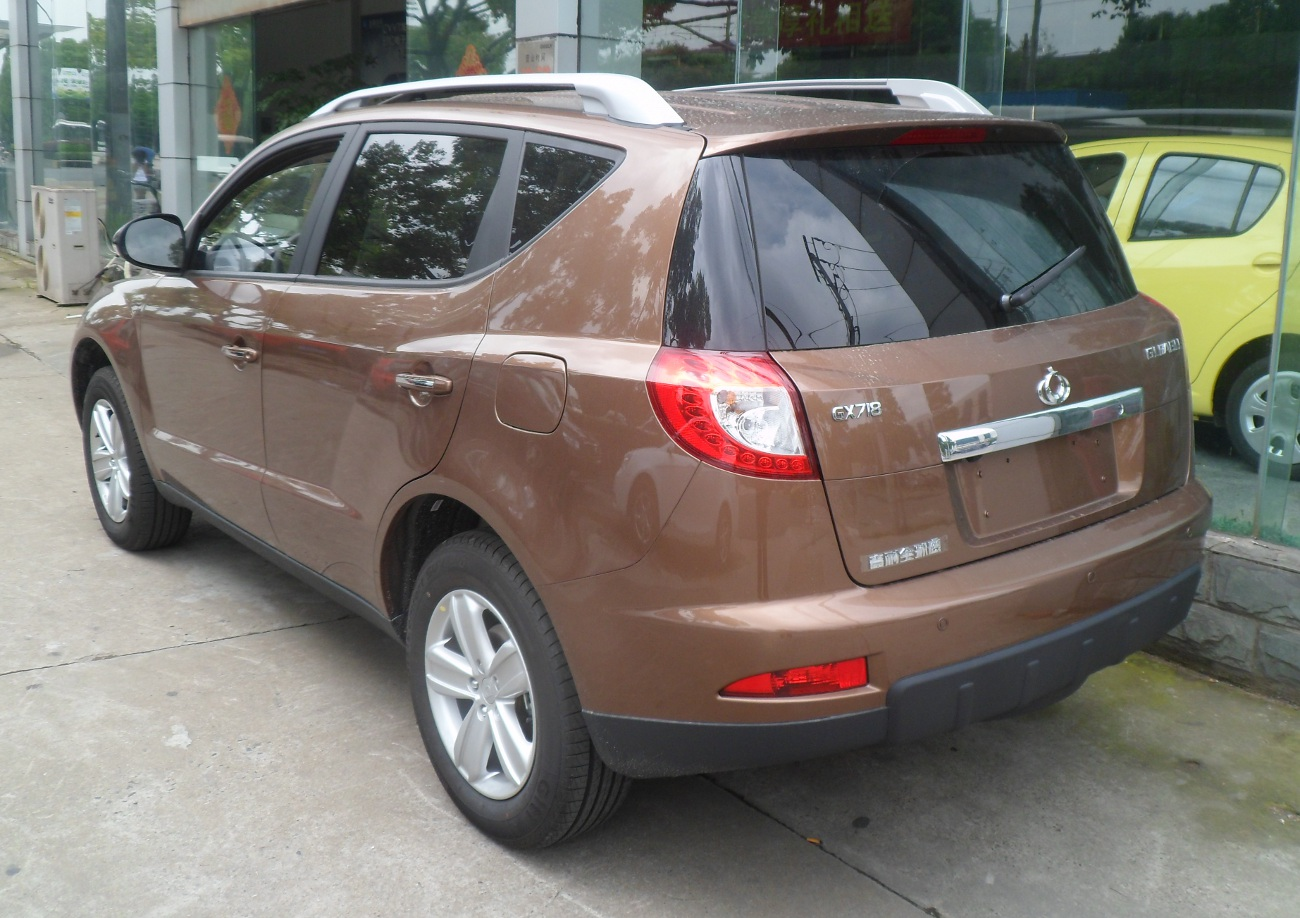
Pre-facelift Gleagle GX7 (rear)

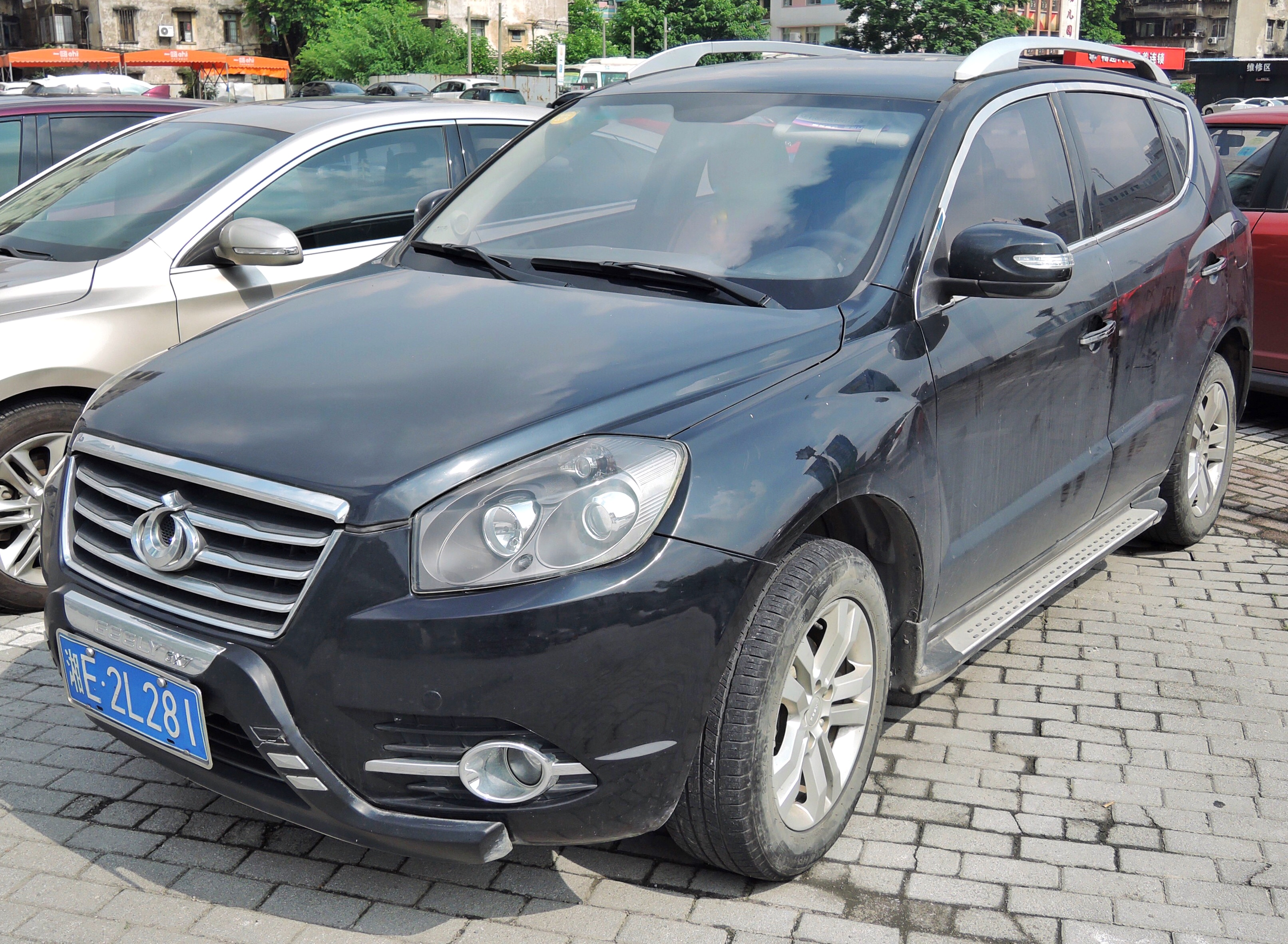
Post-facelift Gleagle GX7

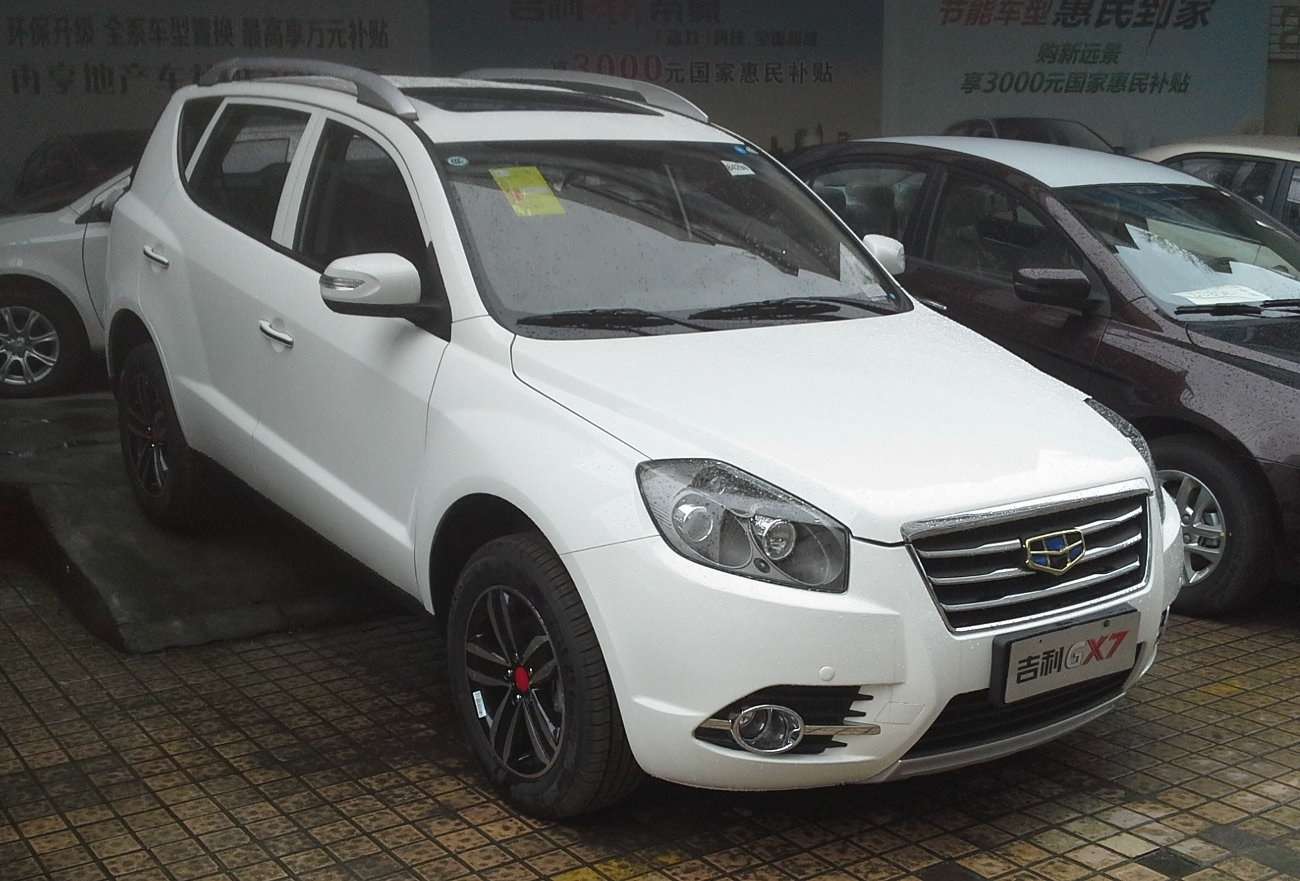
Geely GX7

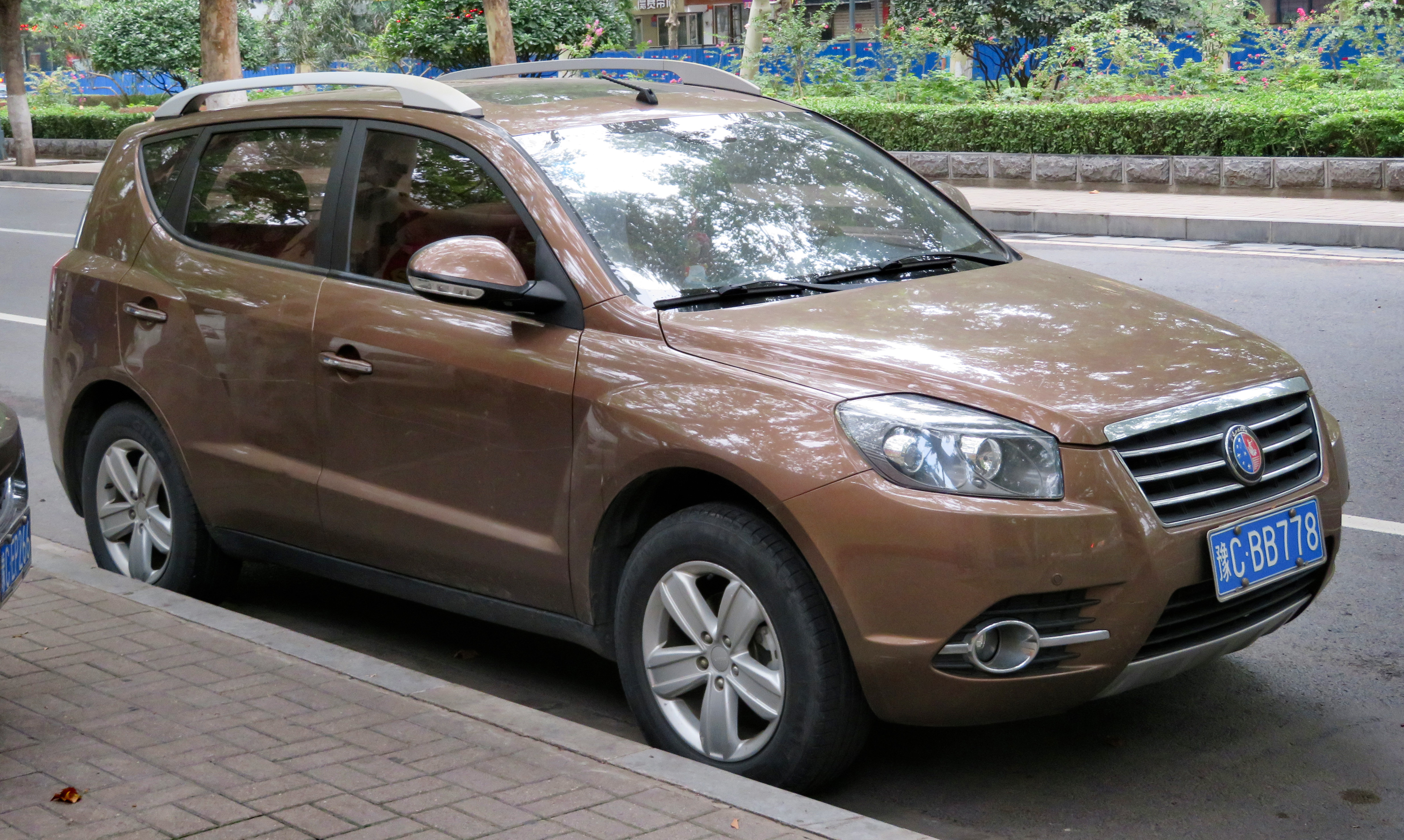
Englon SX7

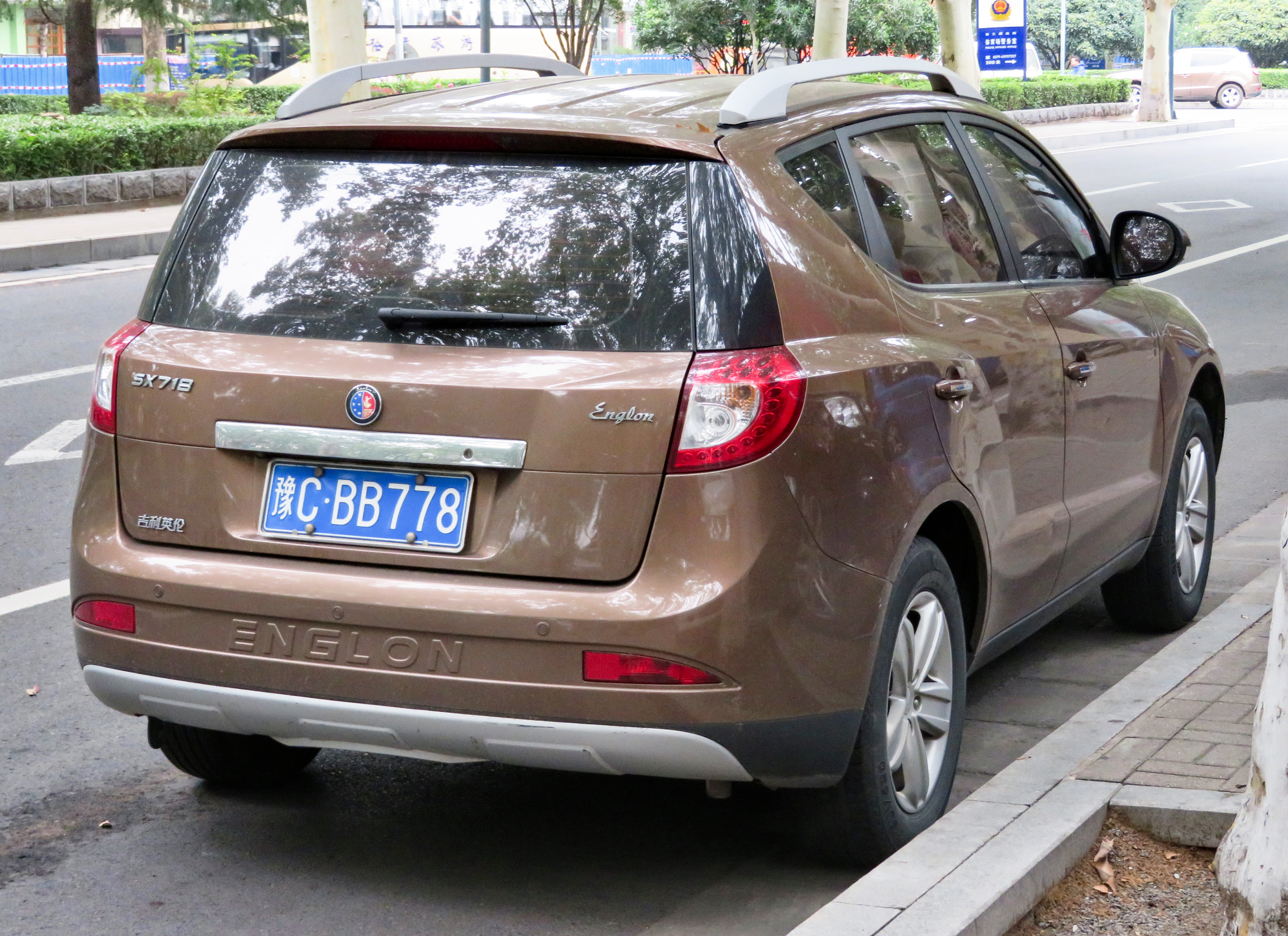
Englon SX7 (rear)

=== Powertrain ===
The engines offered on the Gleagle GX7 and Geely GX7 is a 1.8 liter inline-four engine producing 133 hp (98 kW), a 1.8 liter inline-four engine producing 139 hp (102 kW), and a 2.0 liter inline-four engine producing 141 hp (104 kW) with a 6-speed automatic transmission.

== Second generation (Yuanjing X6; 2016; NL-4) ==
Geely Yuanjing X6
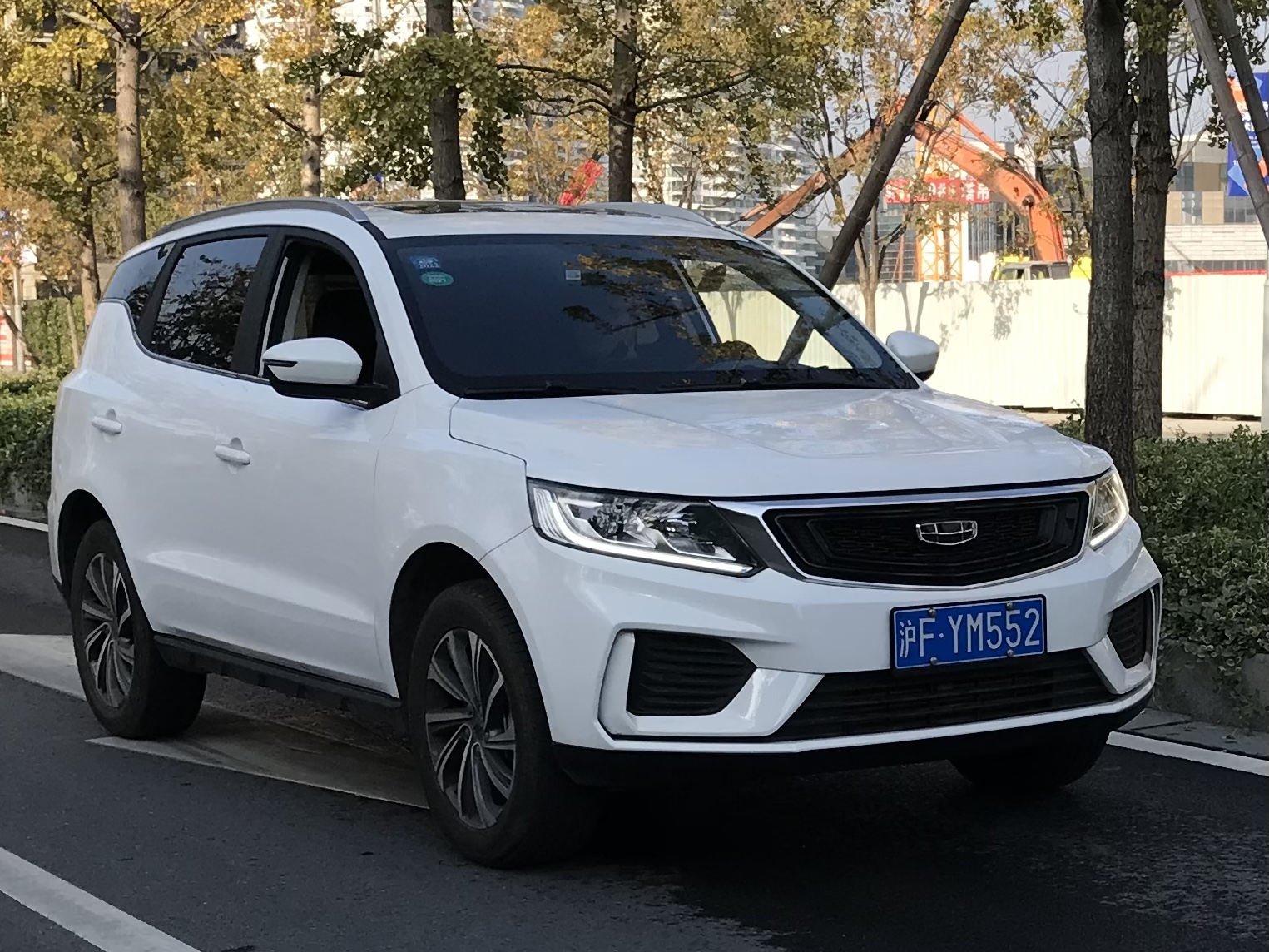

Overview
- Model code: NL-4
- Also called: Geely Vision X6
- Production: 2016–2024
- Model years: 2016–2024
- Assembly: China: Chengdu

Body and chassis
- Platform: Geely NL
- Related: Geely GX9

Powertrain
- Engine: 1.3 L 4G13 turbo I4; 1.4 L JLB-4G14TB turbo I4; 1.8 L 4G18 I4
- Transmission: 5-speed manual 8-speed CVT

Dimensions
- Wheelbase: 2,661 mm (104.8 in)
- Length: 4,500–4,546 mm (177.2–179.0 in)
- Width: 1,840 mm (72.4 in)
- Height: 1,700 mm (66.9 in)
- Curb weight: 1,514–1,310 kg (3,338–2,888 lb)

In 2016, Geely launched the model codename NL-4 and changed its name again to Vision X6 or Yuanjing X6. The facelift updated the front DRG and mainly the grilles of the Yuanjing SUV to be inline with the rest of the Geely products, while the name change now places the model as part of the Yuanjing product series and the Yuanjing X6/SUV now stands above the Yuanjing X3 and Yuanjing X1 crossovers.

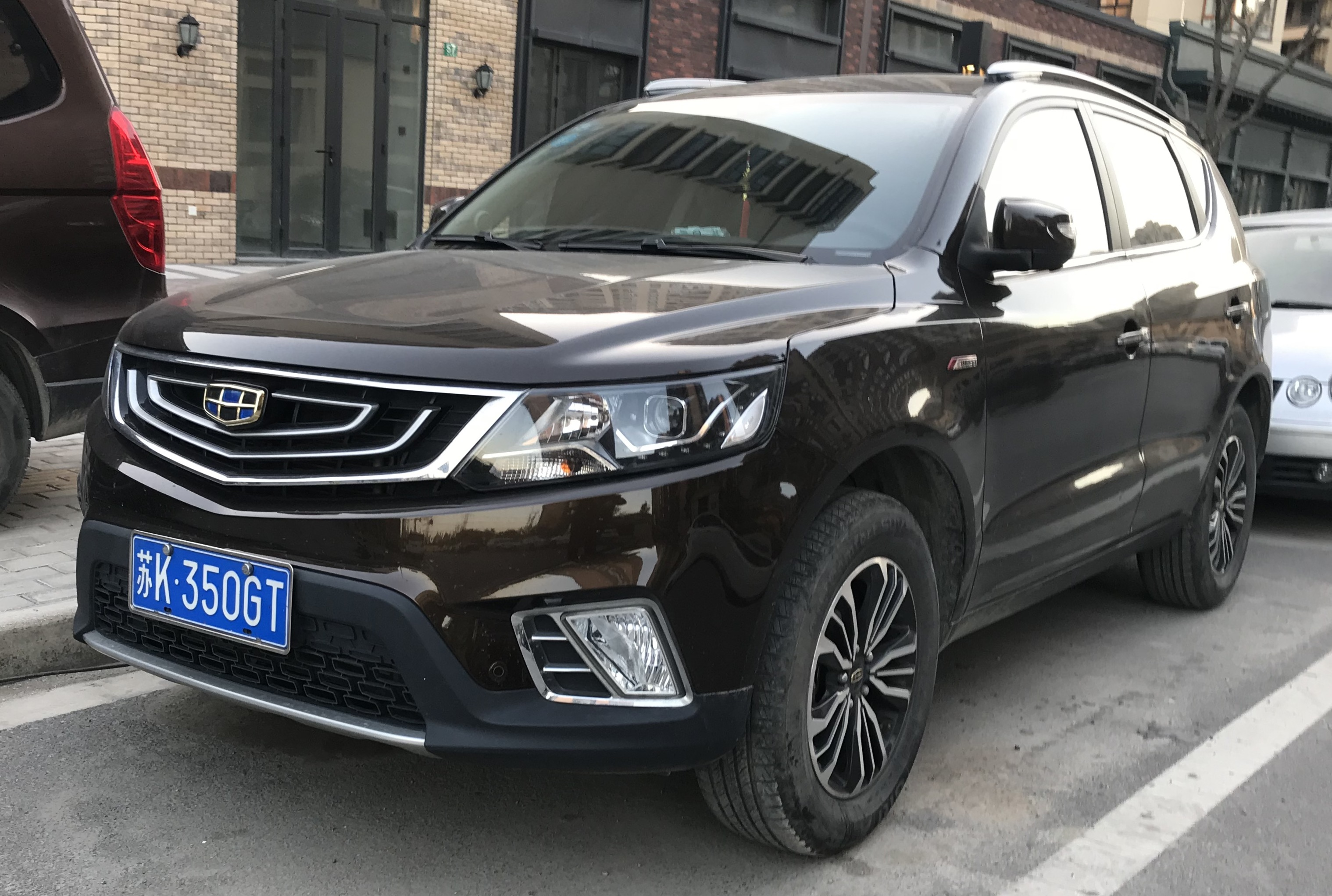
Geely Yuanjing X6

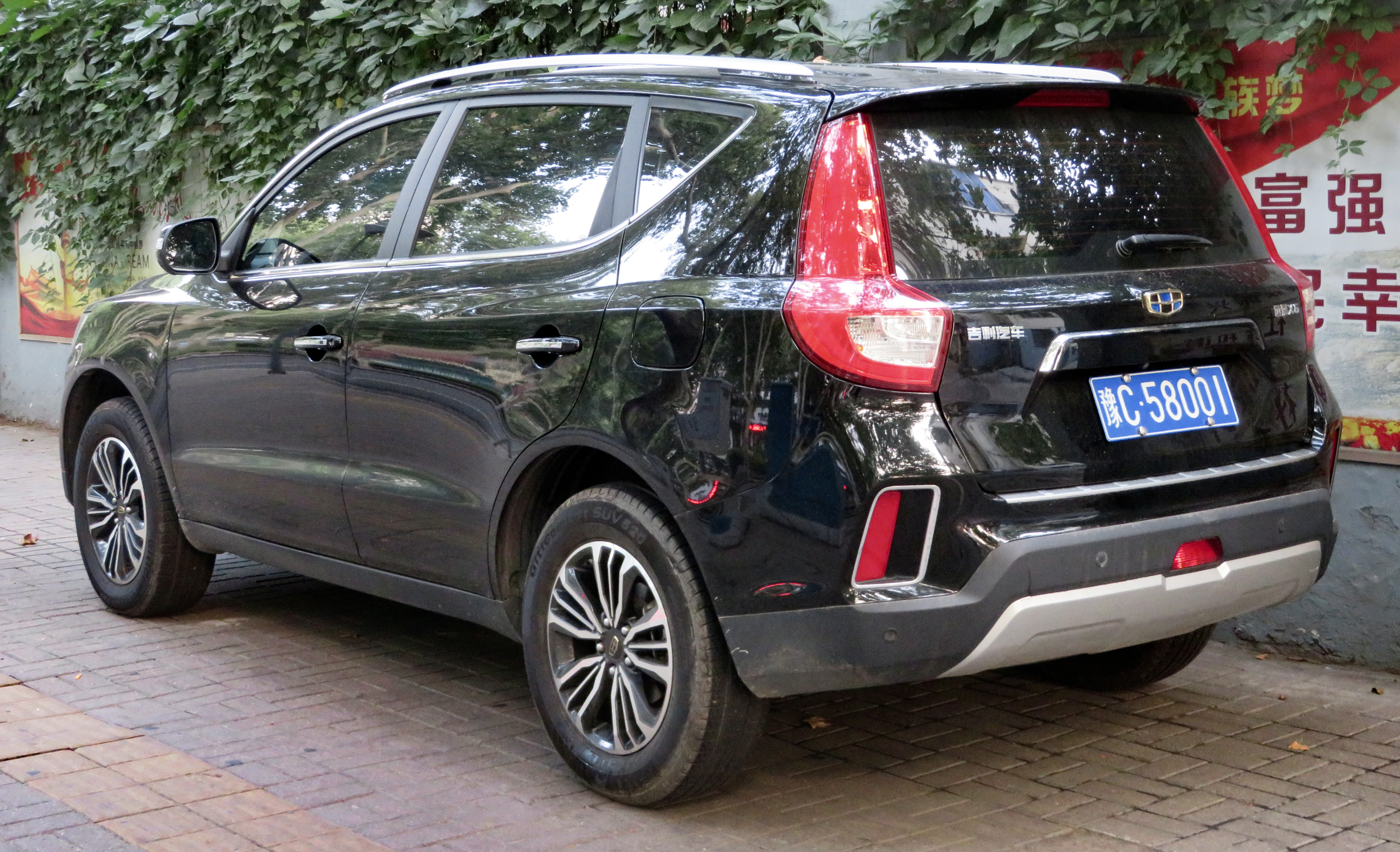
Rear view

=== Powertrain ===
The engines offered on the Geely Yuanjing X6 is a 1.3 liter turbo inline-4 engine producing 133 hp mated to a CVT, and the 1.8 liter inline-4 engine producing 139 hp from the pre-facelift model mated to a 5-speed manual gearbox.

=== 2018 facelift ===
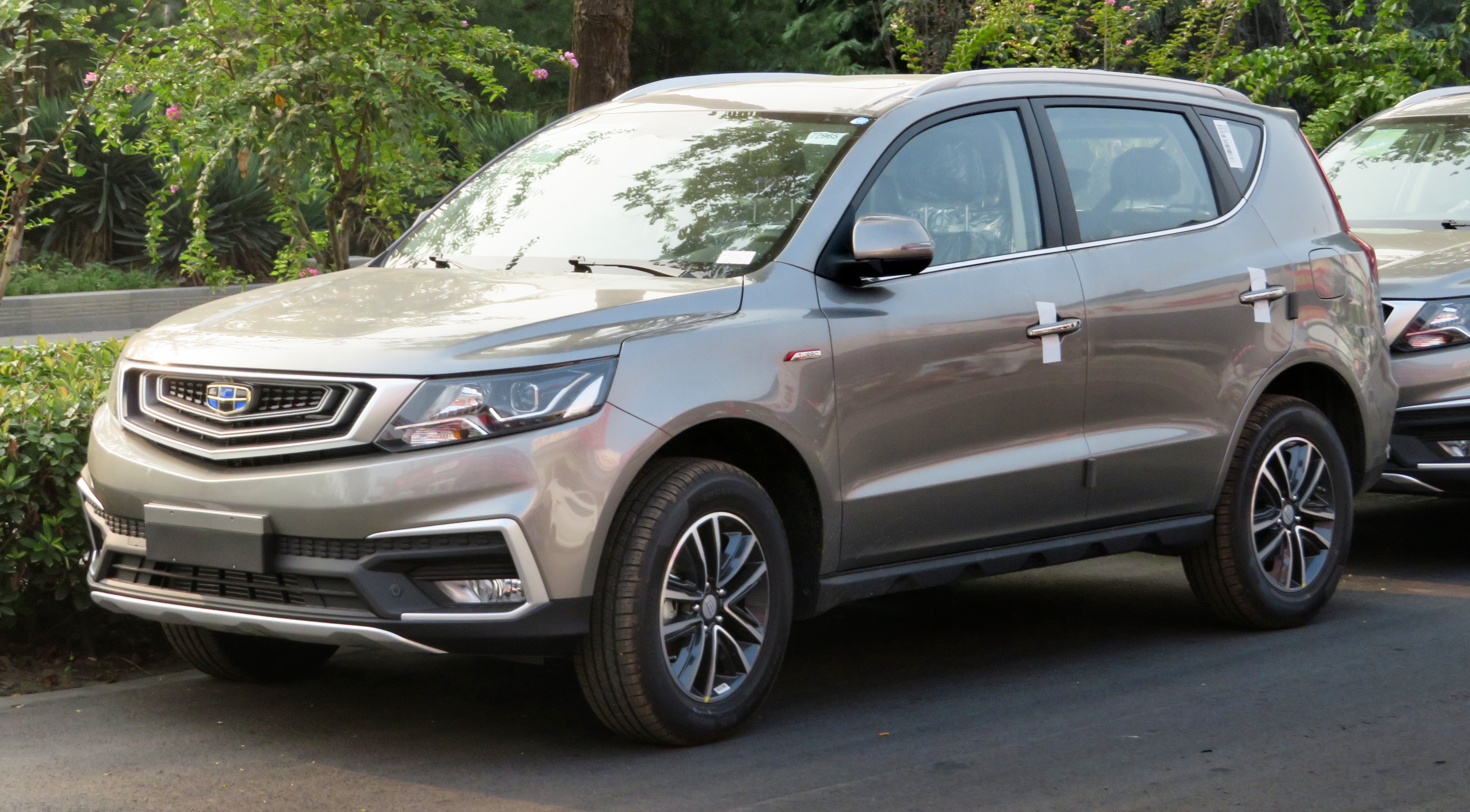
Geely Yuanjing X6 (facelift)

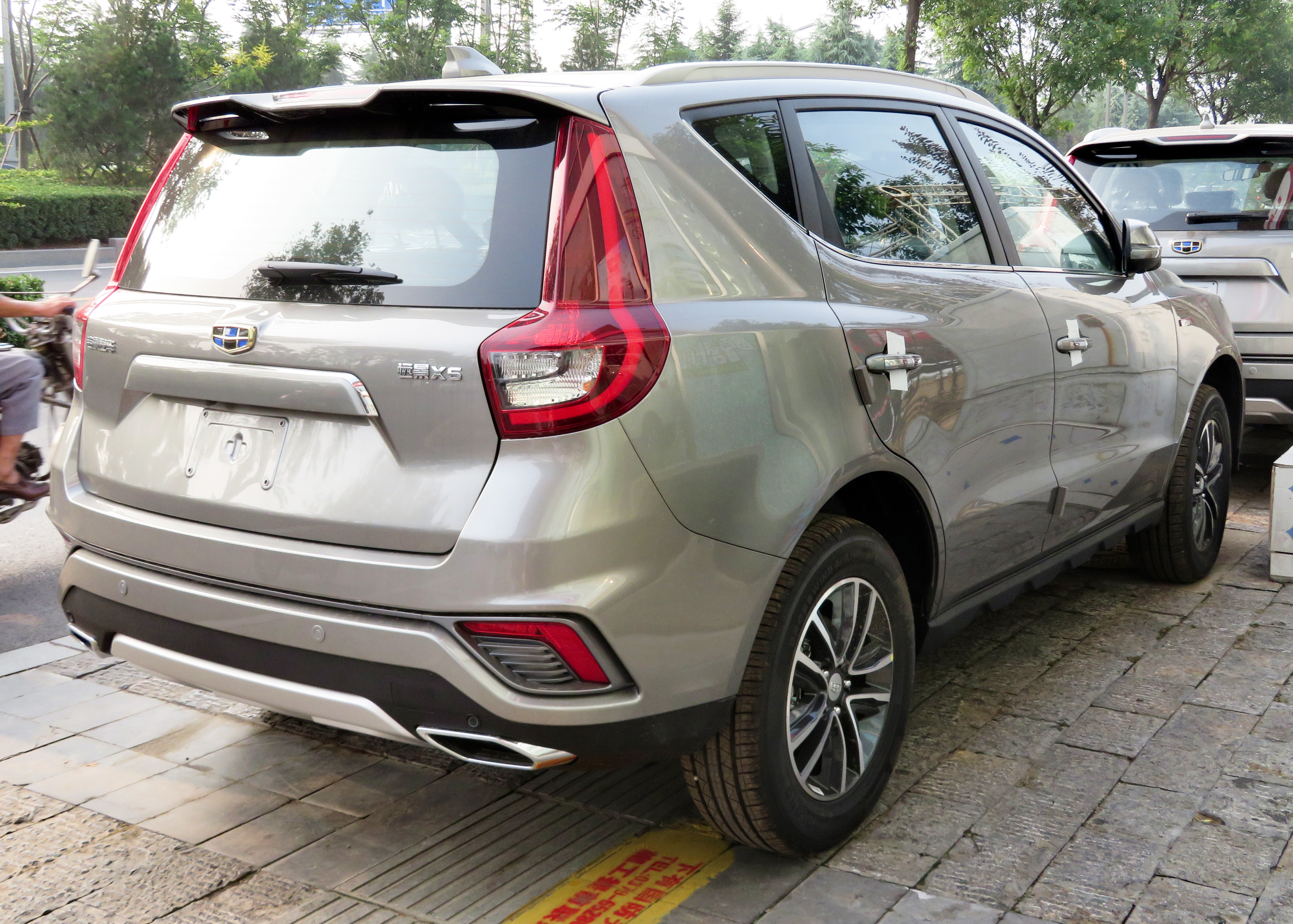
Rear view

=== 2020 facelift ===
As of October 2019, images of the Geely Yuanjing X6 facelift was revealed featuring a slightly restyled front fascia, a completely redesigned rear and black Geely badges. The updated model has a vehicle length of 4,546mm, a width of 1,834mm, and a height of 1,515mm, and the wheelbase is 2,661mm. Power comes from a 1.4 liter turbo engine producing a maximum power of 141 PS and a torque of 235Nm.

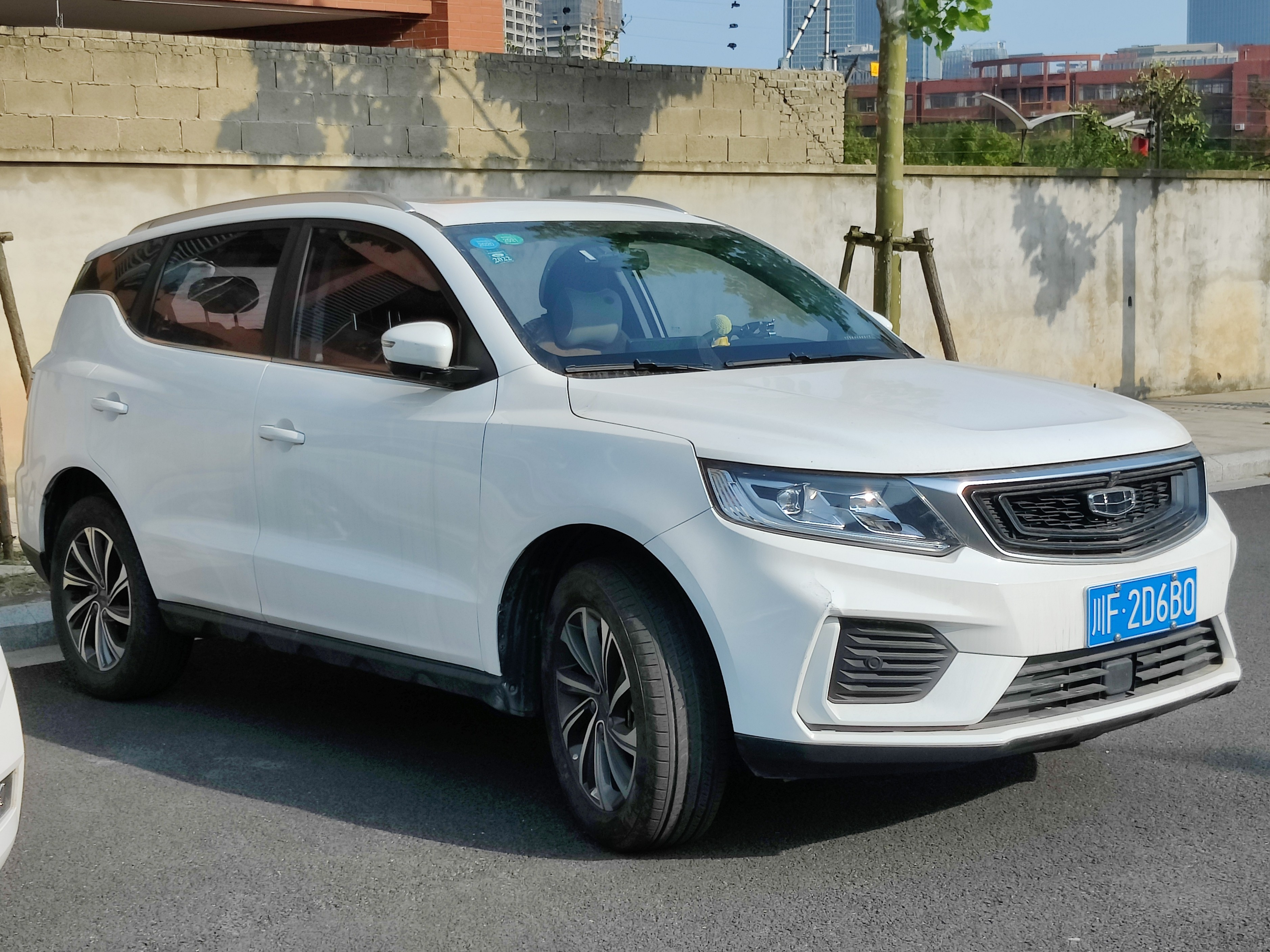
2020 Geely Yuanjing X6 (facelift)

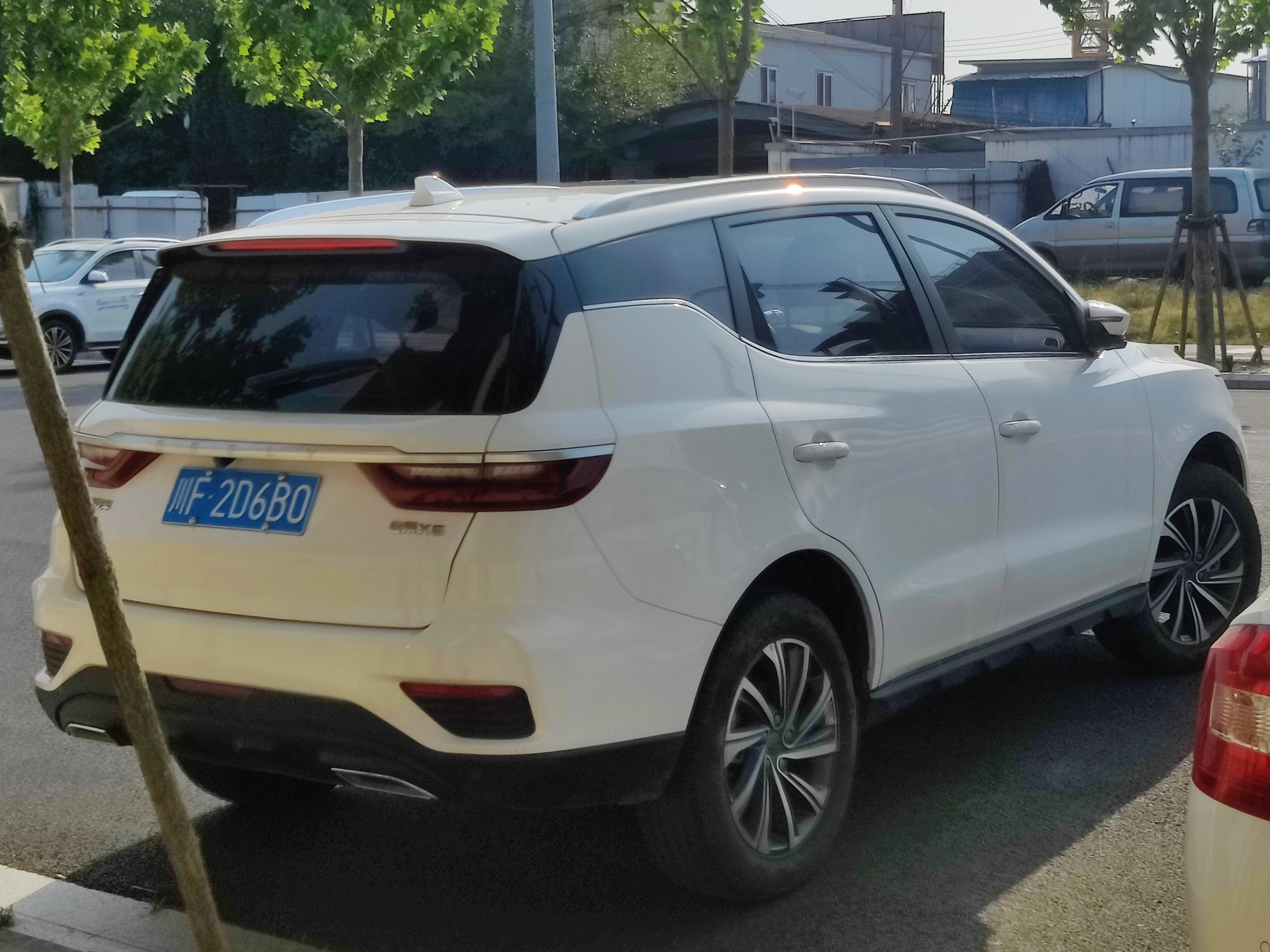
Rear view

=== 2021 facelift (Yuanjing X6 Pro) ===
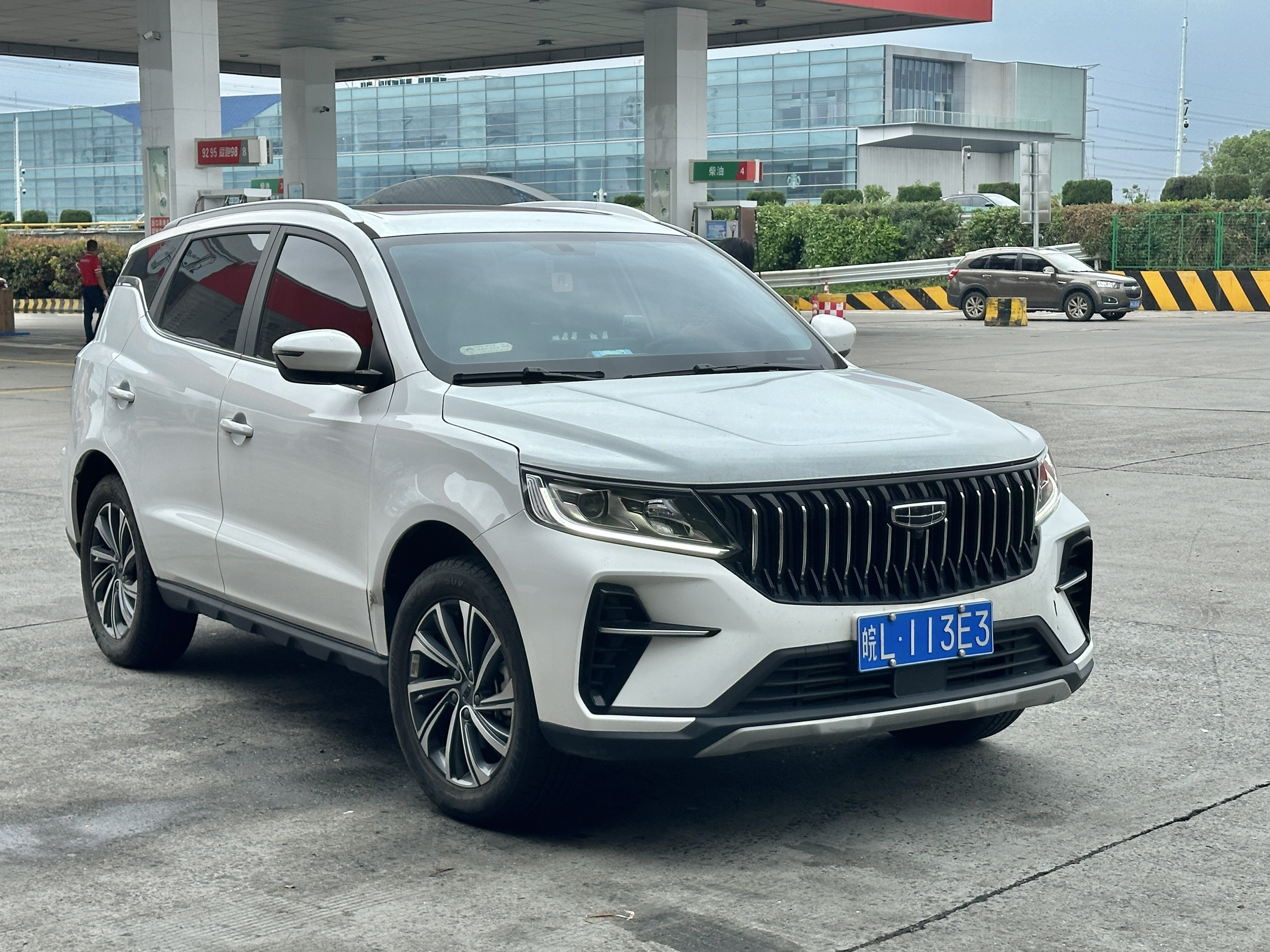
2021 Geely Yuanjing X6 Pro

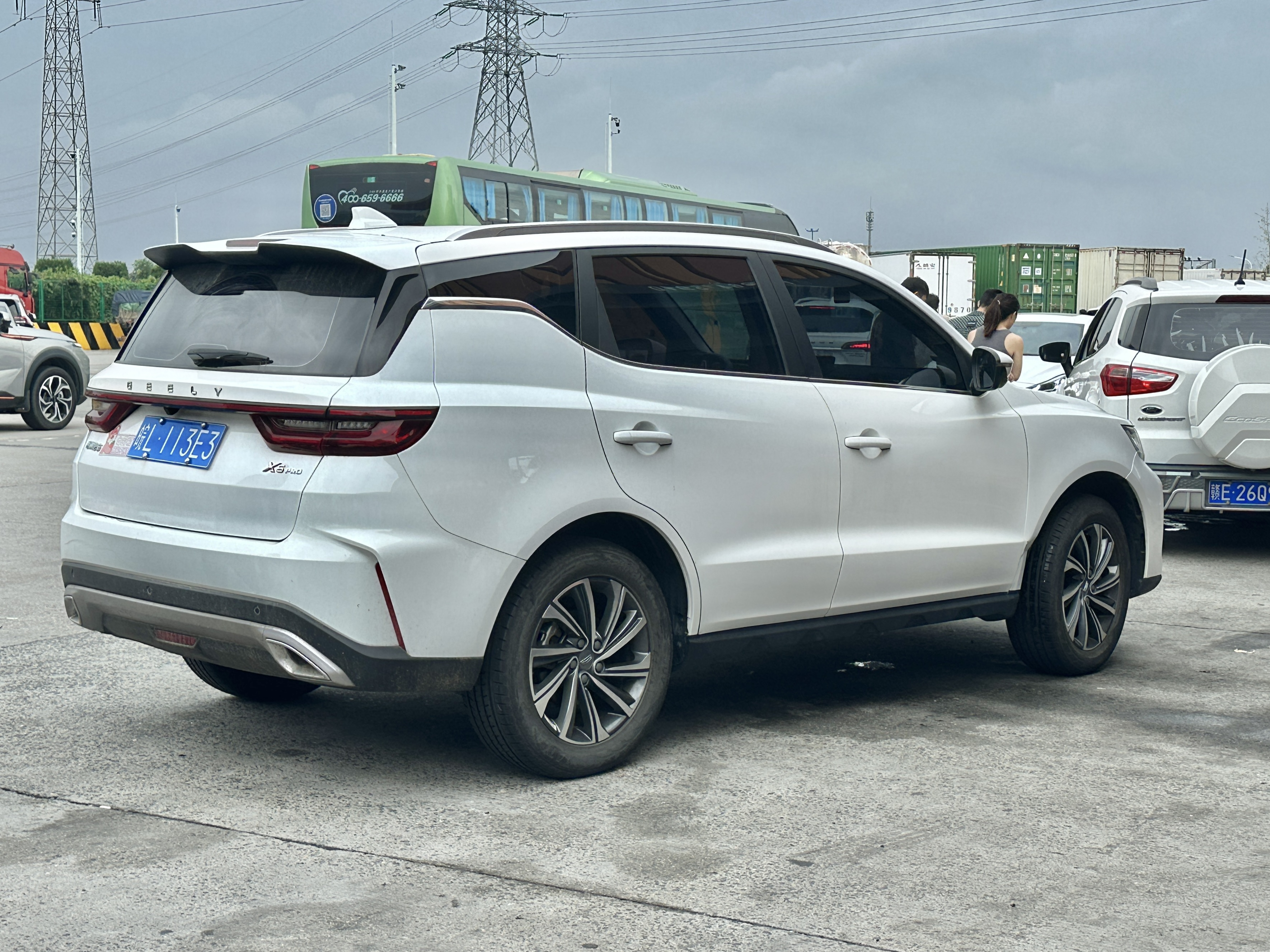
Rear view

== Third generation (Haoyue Pro; 2024; NC31) ==
Geely Haoyue Pro
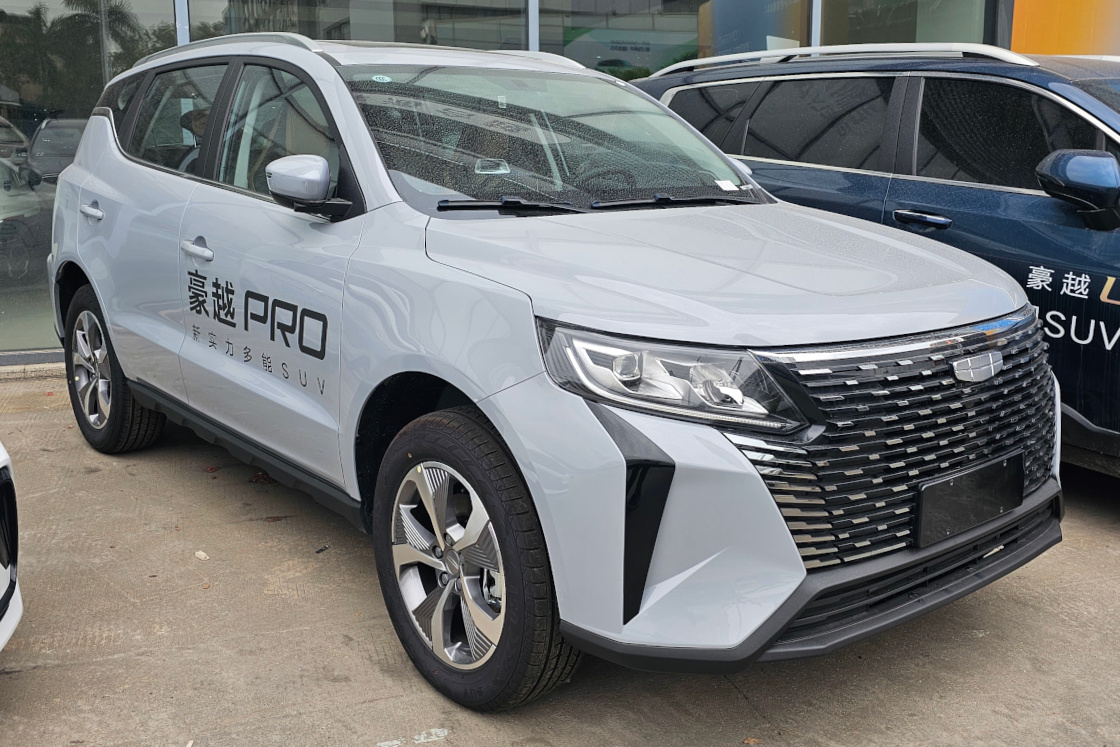

Overview
- Model code: NC31
- Also called: Livan X6 Pro (Russia); KMC SR5 (Iran); EMC 7 (Italy, 2025–present)
- Production: 2024–present; 2024–2025 (China)
- Model years: 2024–present
- Assembly: China: Chengdu

Body and chassis
- Platform: Geely NL

Powertrain
- Engine: 1.5 L BHE15-EFZ turbo I4
- Transmission: 7-speed Dual-clutch transmission

Dimensions
- Wheelbase: 2,661 mm (104.8 in)
- Length: 4,518 mm (177.9 in)
- Width: 1,834 mm (72.2 in)
- Height: 1,715 mm (67.5 in)
- Curb weight: 1,499 kg (3,305 lb)

Chronology
- Predecessor: Geely Vision X6

Based on the Yuanjing X6, Geely launched a major upgraded model codename NC31 and renamed to Haoyue Pro in 2024, despite having no relationship to the Geely Haoyue three-row crossover SUV. The Haoyue Pro was sold from January 2024. It is exported to Russia as the Livan X6 Pro.

== Sales ==
| Year | China | |
| | Yuanjing X6 | Haoyue Pro |
|---|---|---|
| 2023 | 20,551 | — |
| 2024 | 4,615 | 10,452 |
| 2025 | 15 | 4,113 |
