= Geely Haoyue =

Mid-size SUV

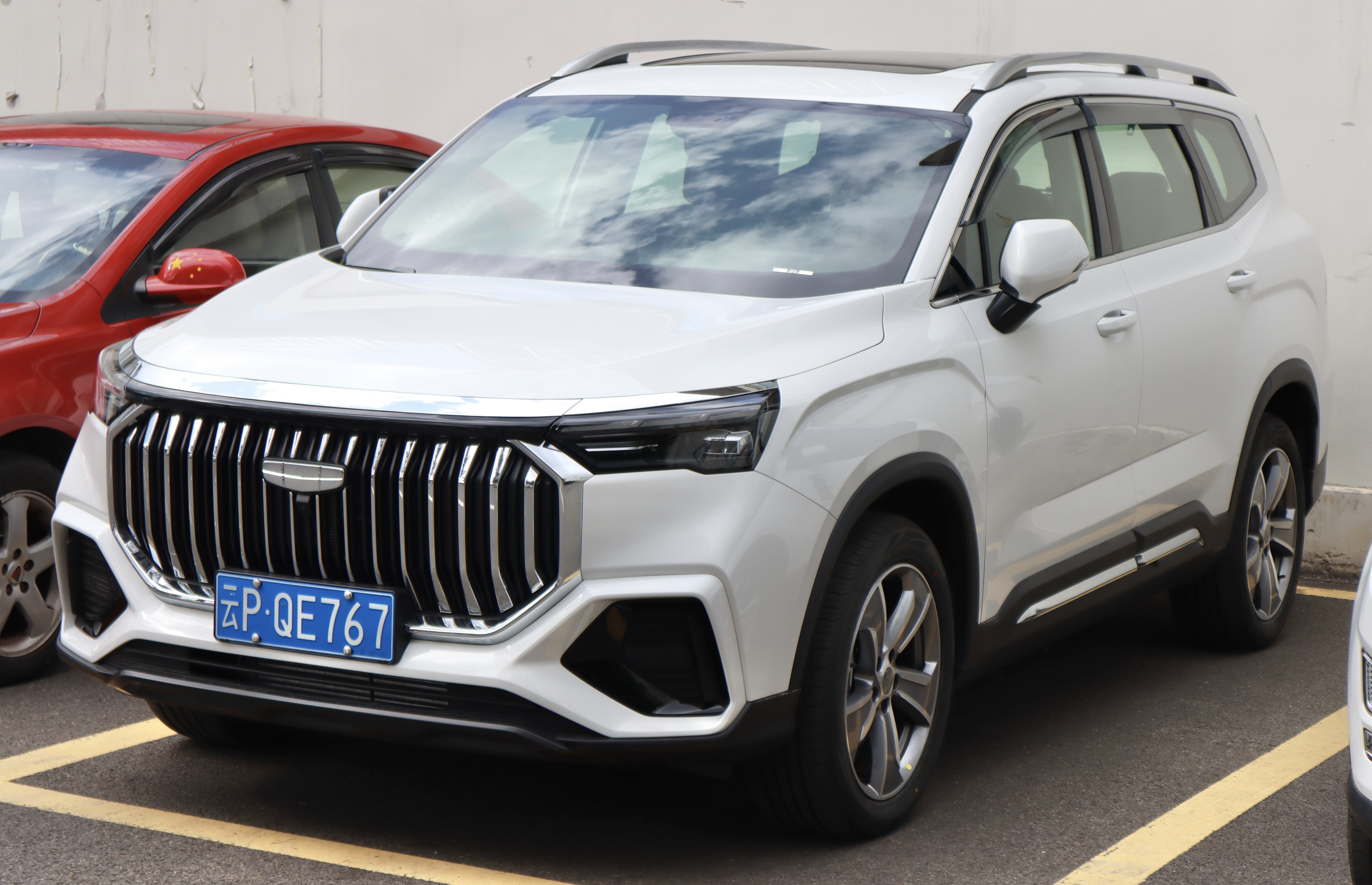
- Geely Haoyue L (second generation)

Overview
- Manufacturer: Geely
- Also called: Geely Okavango; Proton X90 (Malaysia, 2023–present)
- Production: 2020–present

Body and chassis
- Class: Mid-size SUV
- Body style: 5-door crossover SUV

Chronology
- Predecessor: Geely GX9; Proton Exora (for Proton)

The Geely Haoyue (Chinese: 吉利豪越) is a mid-size SUV produced by the Chinese automaker Geely.

In 2020, the first generation was introduced to the Chinese market and exported as the Geely Okavango in overseas markets. The Haoyue name means 'heroic', while Okavango is named after the Okavango Delta in Botswana.

In 2023, the second generation, the Haoyue L, was introduced with a Volvo's Drive-E series 2.0-litre turbo engine and enlarged dimensions.

== First generation (2020–present) ==
Geely Haoyue
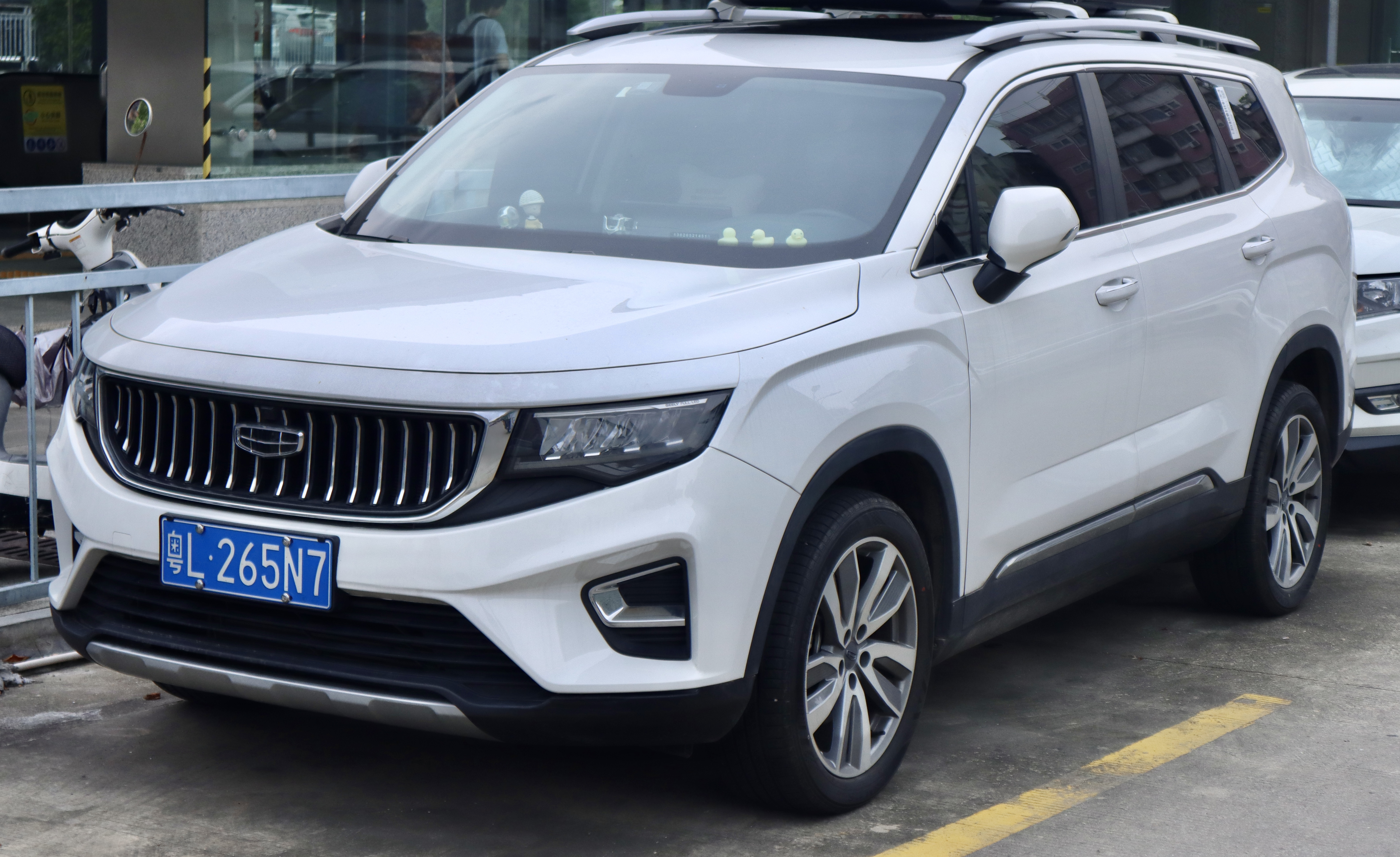

Overview
- Manufacturer: Geely Auto
- Model code: VX11
- Also called: Geely Okavango; Proton X90 (Malaysia); Livan RL9 (electric)
- Production: 2020–2025; 2020–2023 (China); 2023–present (Right Hand Drive version, X90)
- Assembly: China: Baoji, Shaanxi; Ningbo, Zhejiang; Malaysia: Proton City, Tanjung Malim, Perak

Body and chassis
- Class: Mid-size SUV
- Body style: 5-door crossover SUV
- Layout: Front-engine, front-wheel-drive or all-wheel-drive
- Platform: Geely CV
- Related: Geely Jiaji

Powertrain
- Engine: Petrol: 1.5 L 3G15TDB G-Power turbo I3 mild hybrid (Proton X90; 2021-2025); 1.8 L 4G18TDB G-Power turbo I4; 1.5 L BHE15-EFZ turbo I4 (Proton X90; 2026-present)
- Transmission: 7-speed dual-clutch
- Electric range: 470 km (292 mi) (Livan 9, CLTC)

Dimensions
- Wheelbase: 2,815 mm (110.8 in); 2,805 mm (110.4 in) (Proton X90)
- Length: 4,835 mm (190.4 in); 4,830 mm (190.2 in) (Proton X90)
- Width: 1,900 mm (74.8 in)
- Height: 1,780 mm (70.1 in); 1,764 mm (69.4 in) (Proton X90)
- Curb weight: 1,590–1,660 kg (3,510–3,660 lb); 1,730–1,743 kg (3,814–3,843 lb) (Proton X90)

Chronology
- Predecessor: Geely GX9

The Haoyue was codenamed the VX11 during development. The standard transmission of the Geely Haoyue is a 7-speed dual-clutch automatic transmission with front-wheel-drive, and AWD available as an option. Power of the Haoyue comes from a 1.8-litre turbocharged four-cylinder petrol engine producing 181 horsepower (135 kW; 184 PS) and 300 N⋅m (221 lb⋅ft; 31 kg⋅m) of torque.

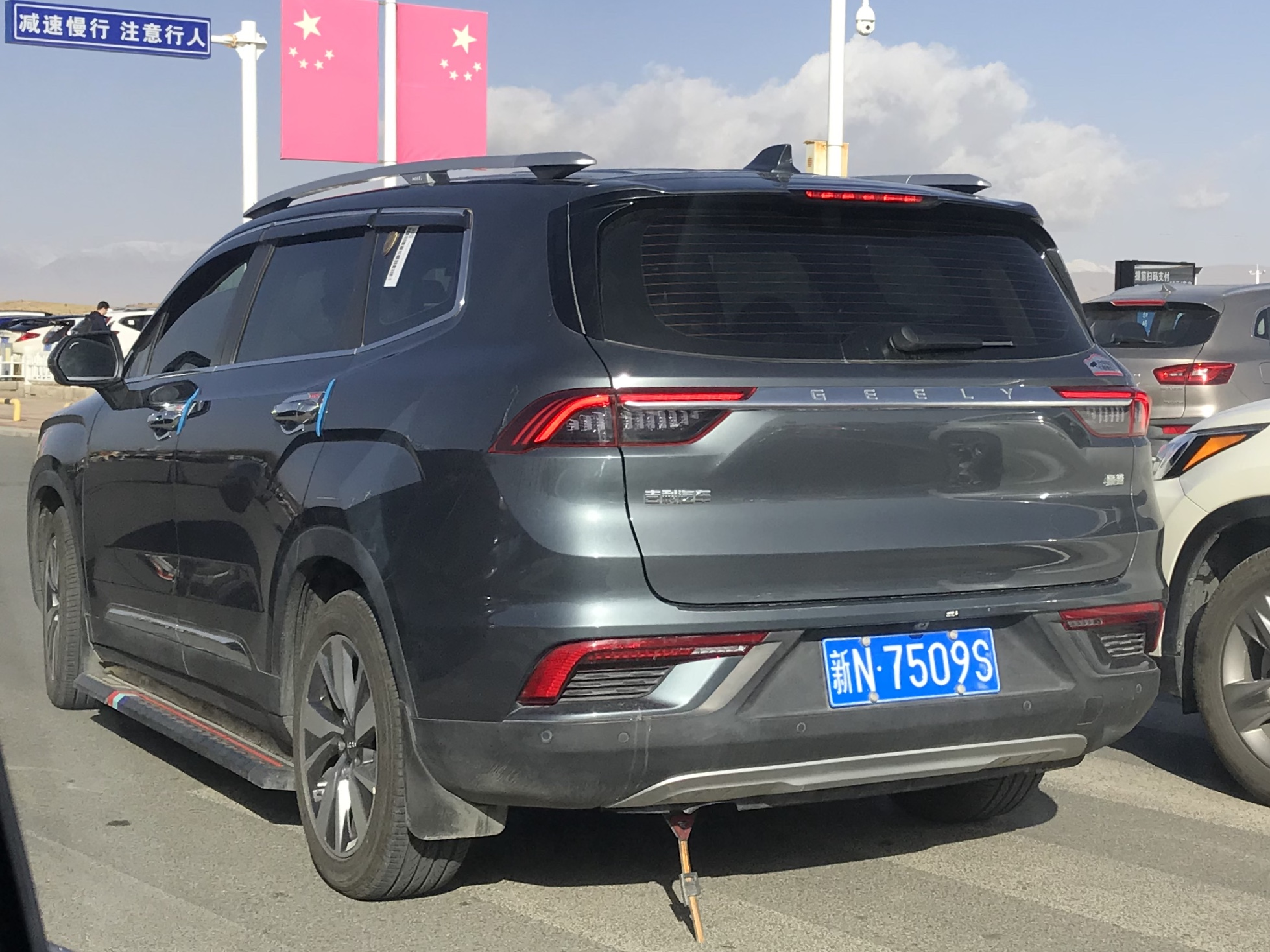
Rear view

=== Proton X90 ===
In May 2023, Proton launched the X90 for the Malaysian market which is a rebadged Haoyue. The X90 is only equipped with a 1.5-litre turbocharged three-cylinder petrol engine with a 48-volt mild hybrid system that features a belt-driven starter generator (BSG), with a seven-speed wet dual-clutch transmission drives only the front-wheel drive layout. Four variants were offered, which are Standard, Executive, Premium and Flagship. All variants feature a 2-3-2 seven-seat configuration with a bench second row seats, except the Flagship which is a six-seater with 2-2-2 layout with a pair of second-row captain seats.

While the Haoyue has a choice of two different rear suspensions, which are torsion beam and independent multi-link, the X90 is equipped with the multi-link suspension. Proton stated that it has tuned the suspension for Malaysian roads.

Outside Malaysia, the X90 has launched in Brunei on 28 August 2023, South Africa on 25 August 2023 and Bangladesh on 29 February 2024. The X90 was launched in Trinidad & Tobago on March 13, 2024.

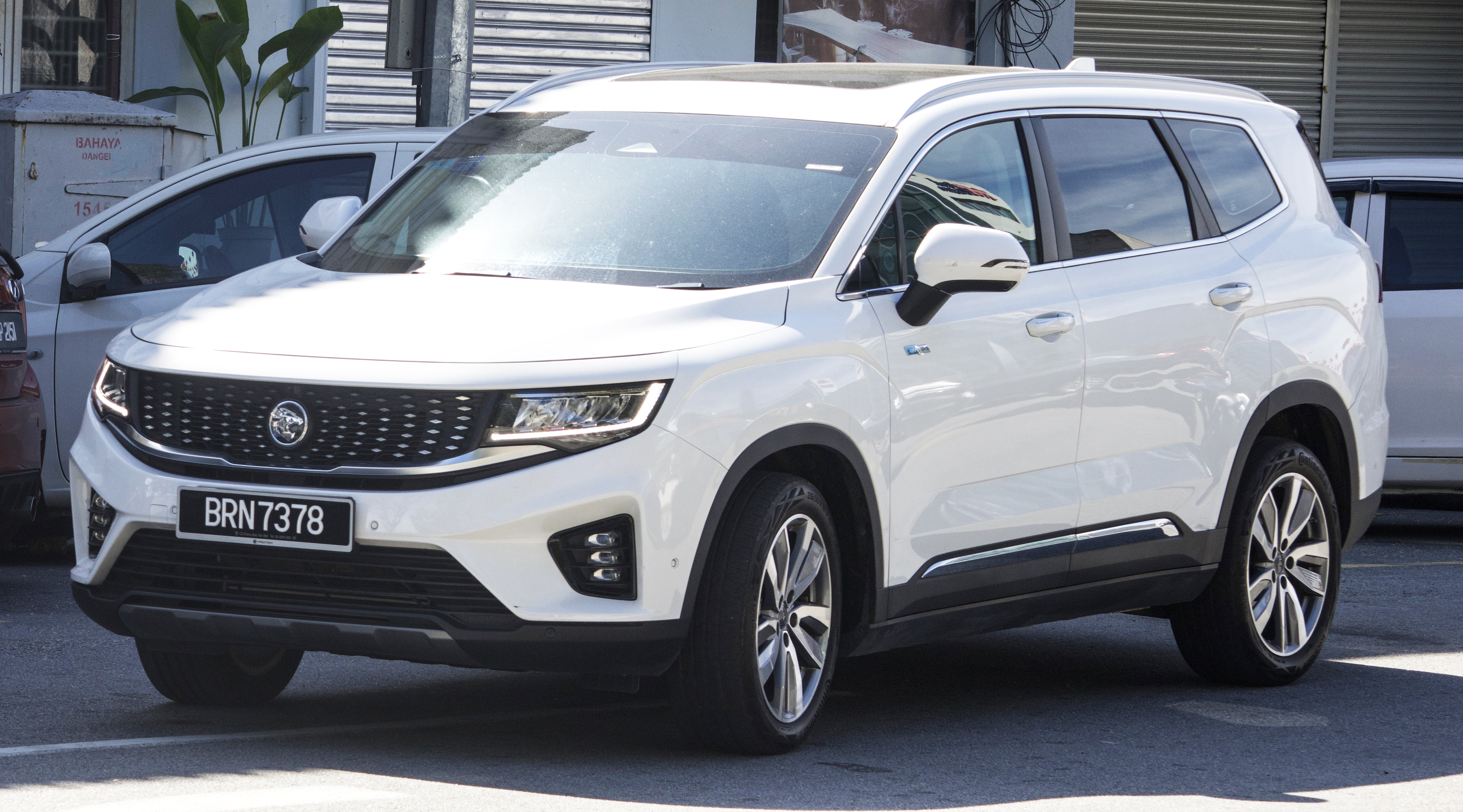
Proton X90

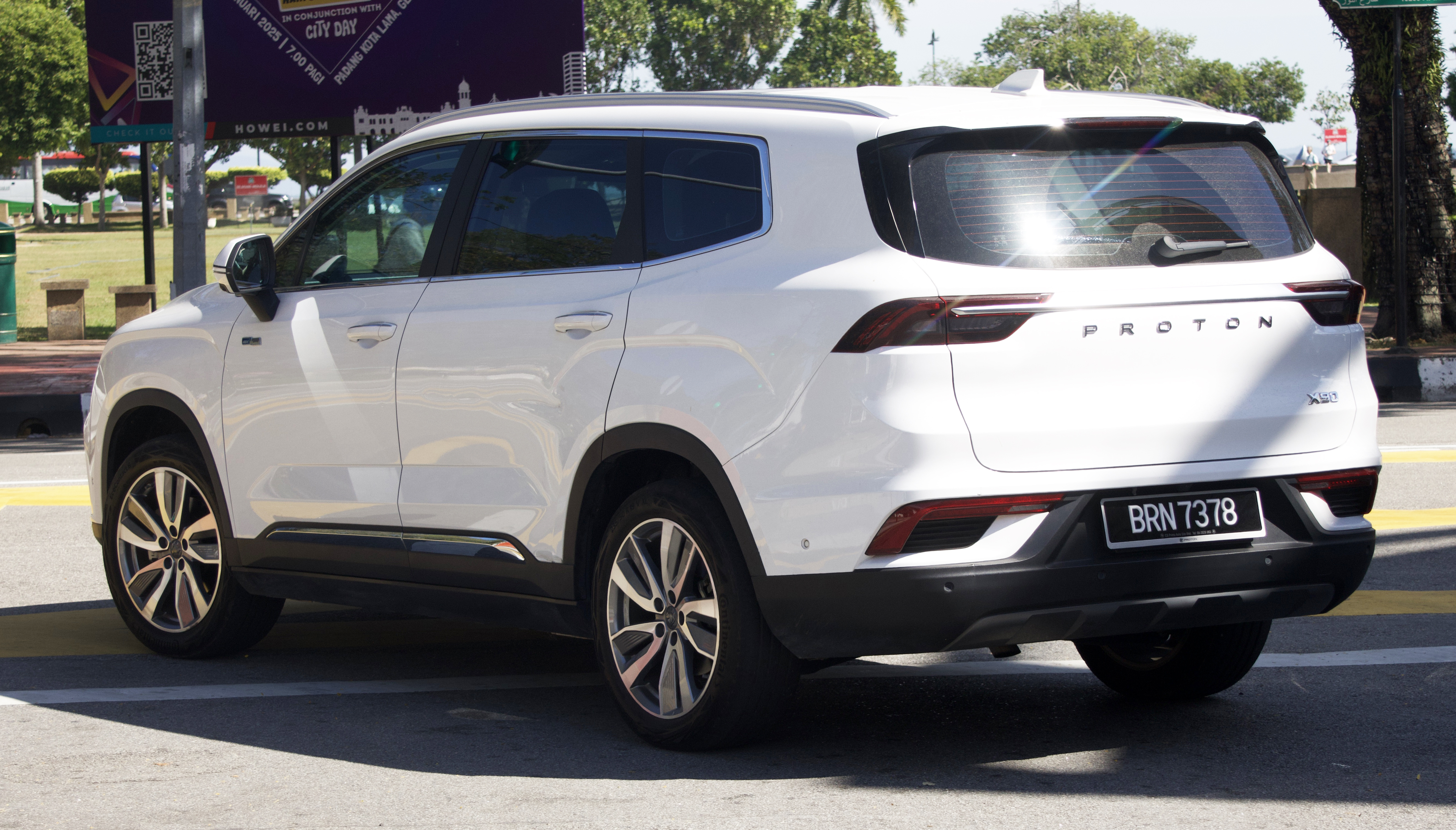
Rear view

ASEAN NCAP test results Proton X90 (2023)
Test	Points
Overall:	5 /5 stars
Adult occupant:	37.75
Child occupant:	17.79
Safety assist:	15.71
Motorcyclist Safety:	12.50

==== Facelift ====
In March 2026, the facelifted version of the Proton X90, dubbed the X90 MC (Minor Change) was released. It features the BHE15-EFZ 1.5-litre turbocharged petrol engine, with four cylinders instead of the prior three, and with the 48-volt mild hybrid system removed. The engine was first introduced in the facelifted Proton X50, and in both vehicles produce 181 PS (133 kW; 179 hp) of power at 5,500 rpm and 290 N⋅m (29.6 kg⋅m; 214 lb⋅ft) of torque from 2,000 rpm to 3,500 rpm. It also uses a toothed timing chain that has a 200,000km lifespan, as well as reduced noise and vibration.

The previously offered four variants has been shrunk down to three, which are Lite, Prime, and Prime X. The facelift model saw several equipment options removed, including 4G/WiFi connectivity, auto dimming rear-view mirror, ambient lighting, wireless mobile charger, panoramic sunroof, and any form of ADAS, resulting in a revised one-star rating from ASEAN NCAP. Standard equipment include 225/55R18 alloy wheels, LED headlights with daytime running lamps, fog lamps, leatherette steering wheel and seat upholstery, dual-zone automatic climate control with 2nd and 3rd row air vents, walk-away auto lock, a six-speaker setup tied to a 12.3-inch infotainment system with Wireless Android Auto and Apple Carplay, 6 airbags, hill descent control and hill hold assist.

The Prime variant adds automatic headlamps and front wipers, a 10.3-inch fully digital instrument cluster, security tint, 6-way powered driver seats, 360-degree camera with 180-degree transparent view and front parking sensors. The Prime X variant adds Nappa Leather seat upholstery, 2-way lumbar adjustment for the driver seat and 4-way powered passenger seats with 'Boss' switch, front ventilated seats, 2nd row ventilated captain seats, and a digital video recorder (DVR). Five colours are offered, namely Marine Blue, Armour Silver, Snow White, Jet Grey and Quartz Black.

=== Livan RL9 ===
The Livan RL9 (Chinese: 睿藍9; pinyin: Ruìlán 9) is an electric variant of the first generation Geely Haoyue. Produced by Livan Automotive, the Livan 9 is a 6-7 seater electric midsize crossover SUV launched in December 2022. The Livan RL9 is equipped with a single front motor with a maximum power of 204 horsepower (152 kW; 207 PS) and a peak torque of 310 N⋅m (229 lb⋅ft). The battery of the Livan RL9 is a 66.57 kWh NMC battery pack and has an electric cruising range of 470 kilometres (292 mi) under CLTC conditions.

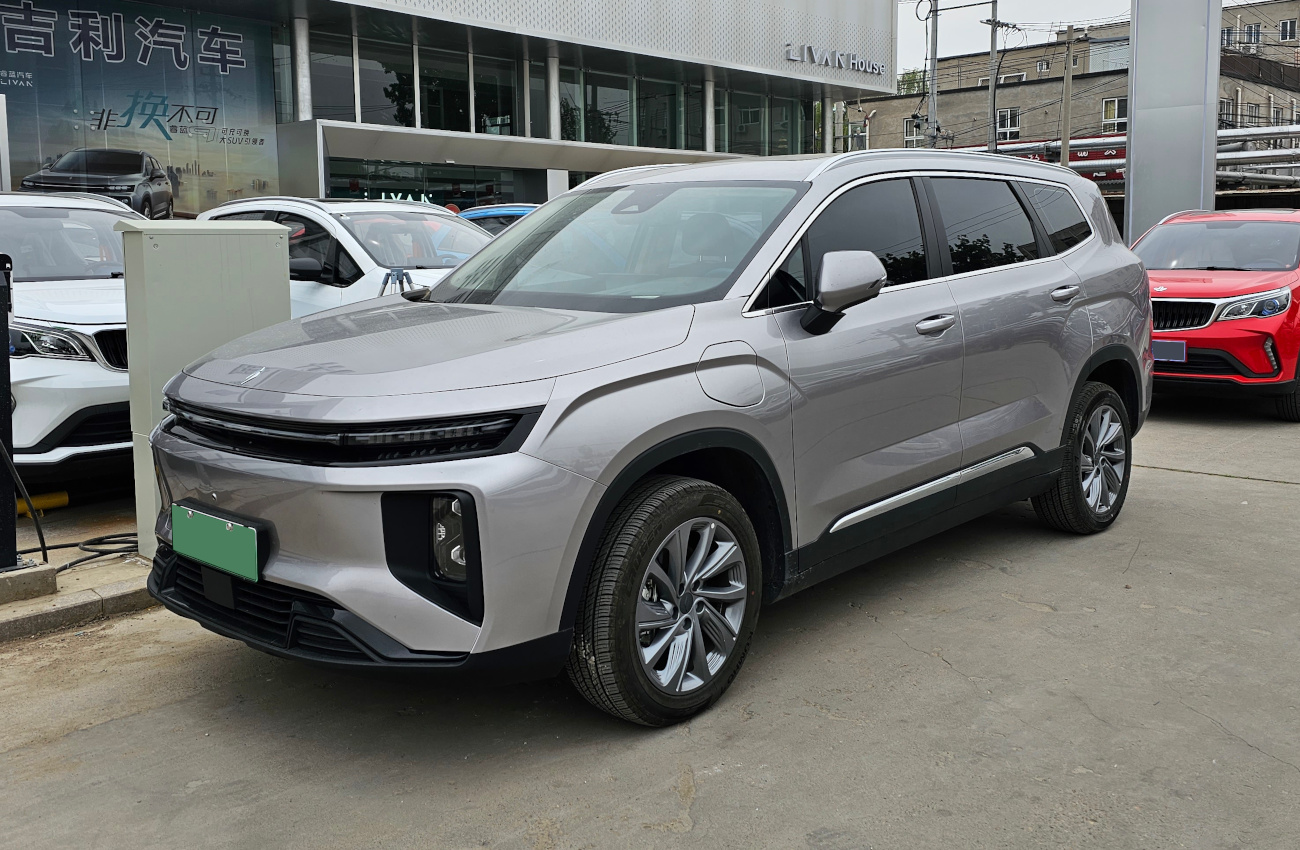
Livan RL9

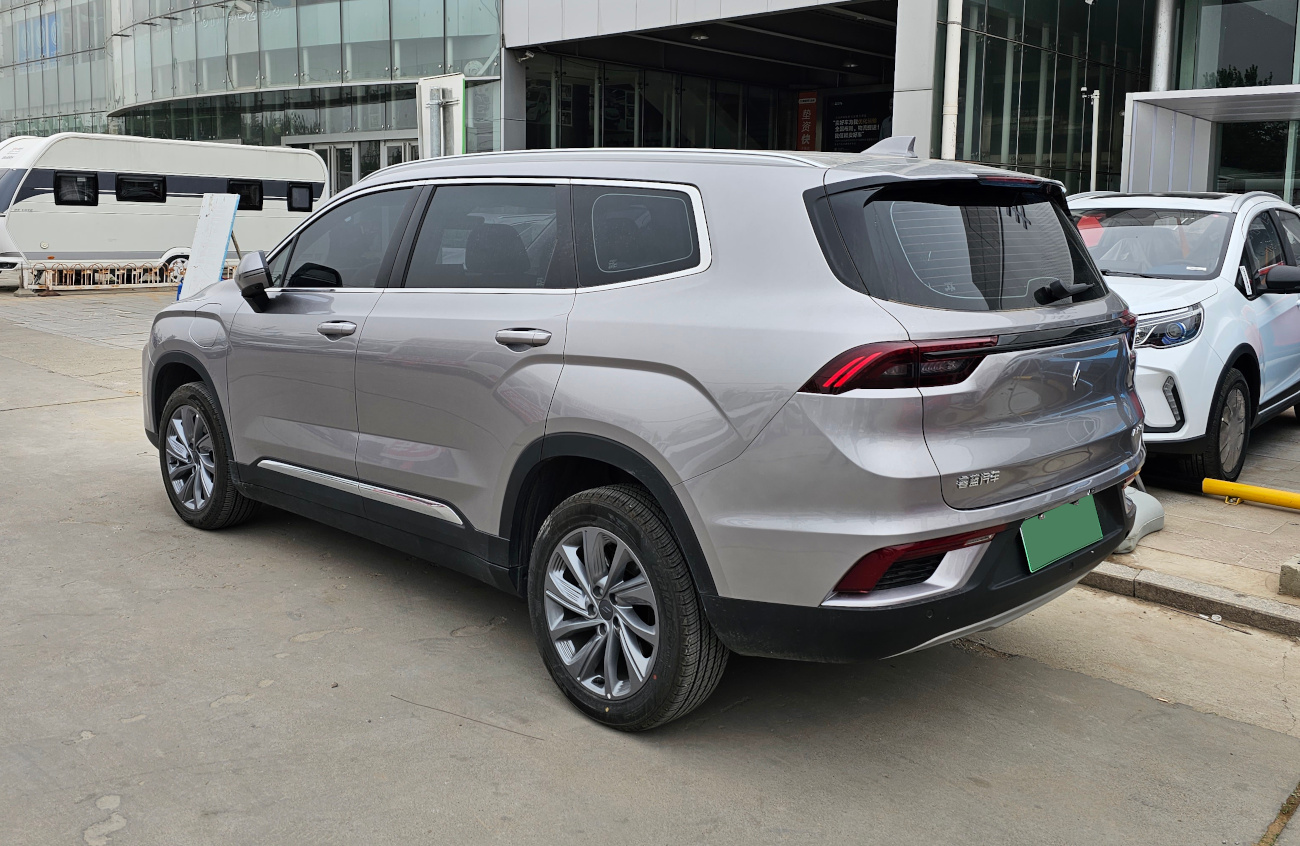
Rear view

== Second generation (Haoyue L; 2023–present) ==
Geely Haoyue L
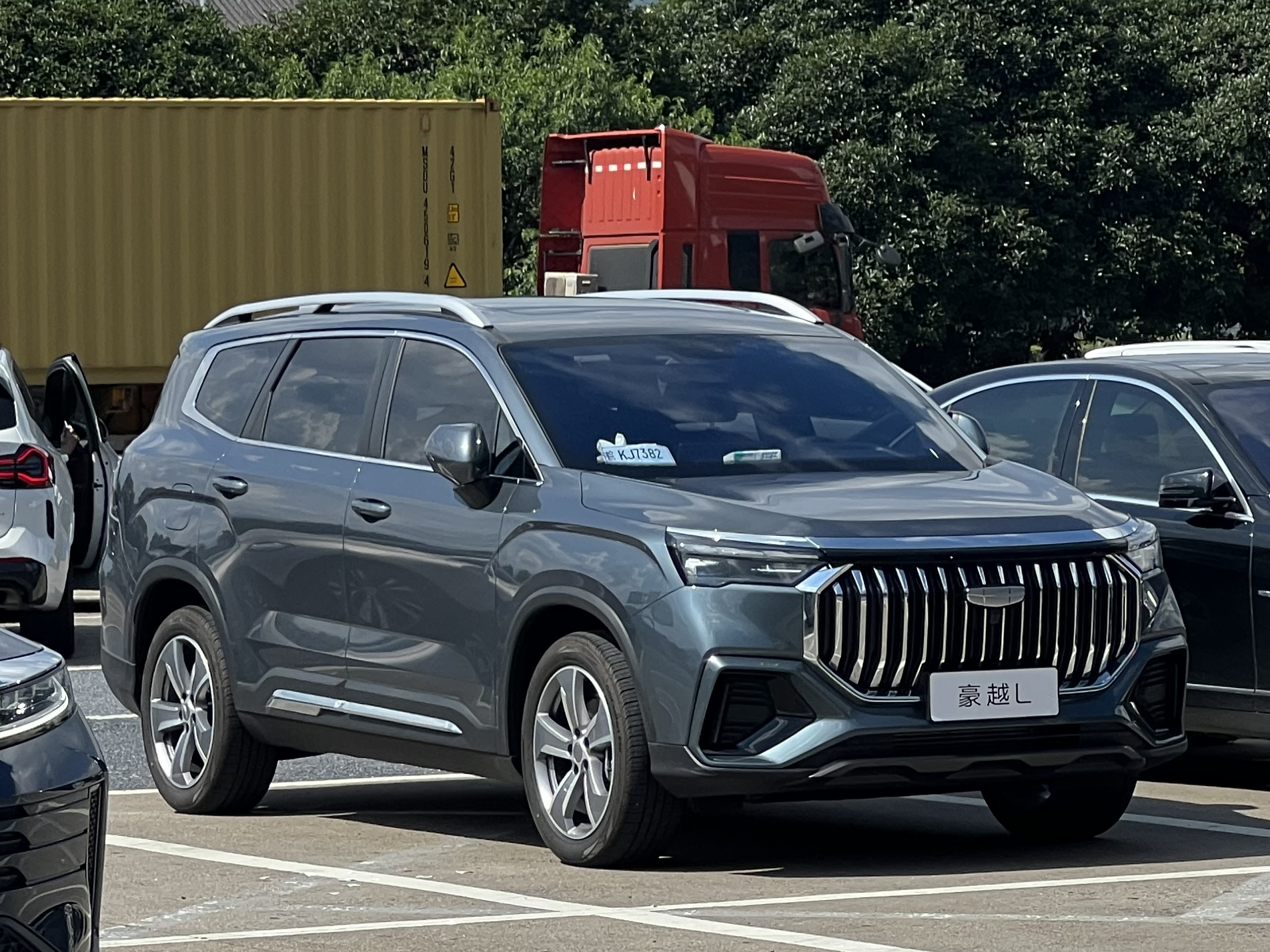

Overview
- Manufacturer: Geely
- Also called: Geely Okavango; Proton X90 (Malaysia)
- Production: 2023–present
- Assembly: China: Baoji, Shaanxi; Ningbo, Zhejiang; Malaysia: Proton City, Tanjung Malim, Perak

Body and chassis
- Class: Mid-size SUV
- Body style: 5-door crossover SUV
- Layout: Front-engine, front-wheel-drive

Powertrain
- Engine: Petrol: 1.5 L BHE15-EFZ turbo I4; 2.0 L JLH-4G20TDJ turbo I4
- Transmission: 7-speed dual-clutch

Dimensions
- Wheelbase: 2,825 mm (111.2 in)
- Length: 4,860 mm (191.3 in)
- Width: 1,910 mm (75.2 in)
- Height: 1,770 mm (69.7 in)
- Curb weight: 1,710 kg (3,770 lb)

Chronology
- Predecessor: Geely Haoyue

The Haoyue L was launched in December 2022, which replaced the original Haoyue. It is powered by a Volvo's Drive-E series 2.0-litre turbo engine with a maximum power of 215 horsepower (160 kW; 218 PS) and a peak torque of 325 N⋅m (240 lb⋅ft; 33 kg⋅m). Acceleration figure takes 7.9 seconds from 0–100 km/h (62 mph).

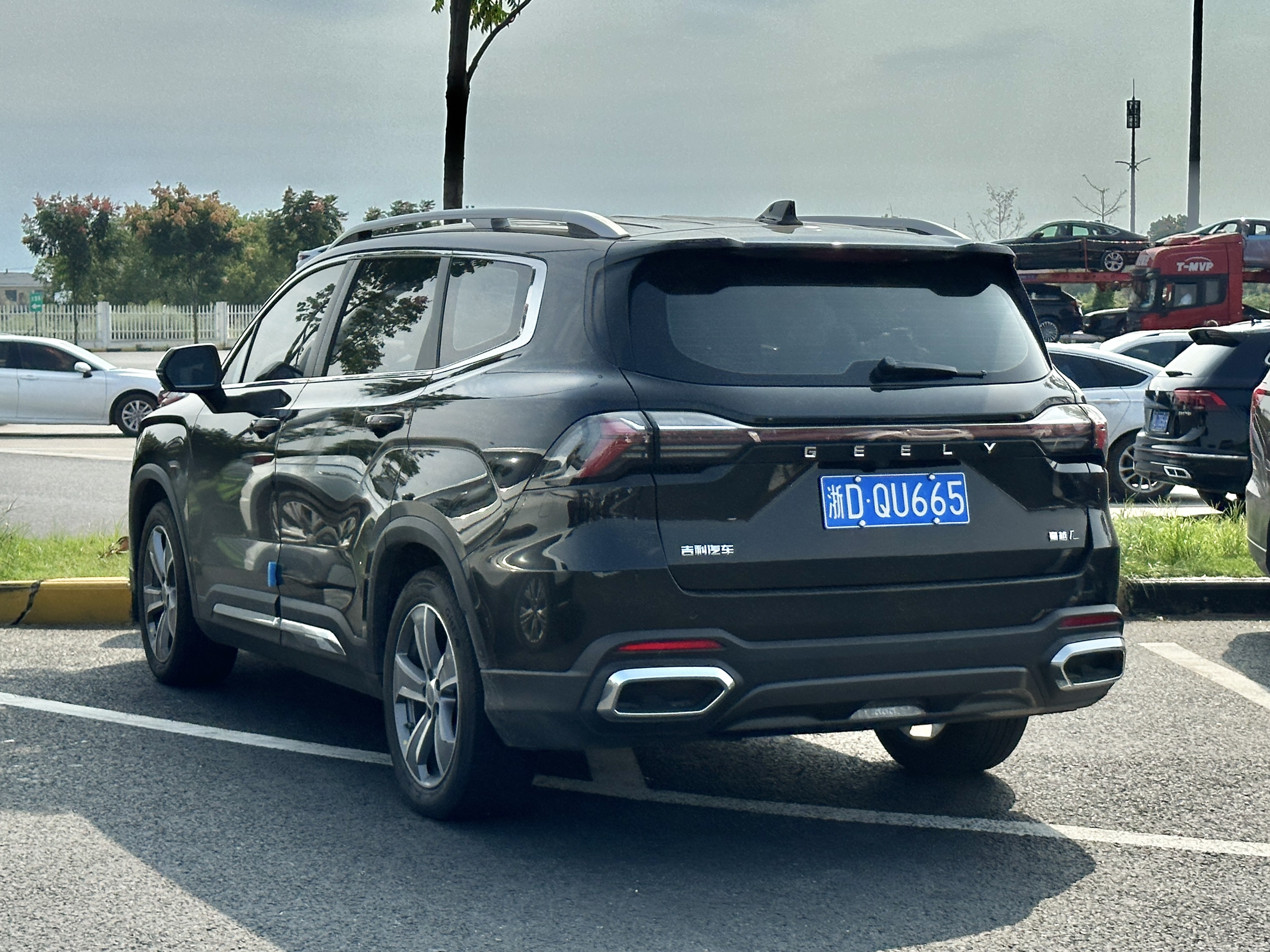
Rear view

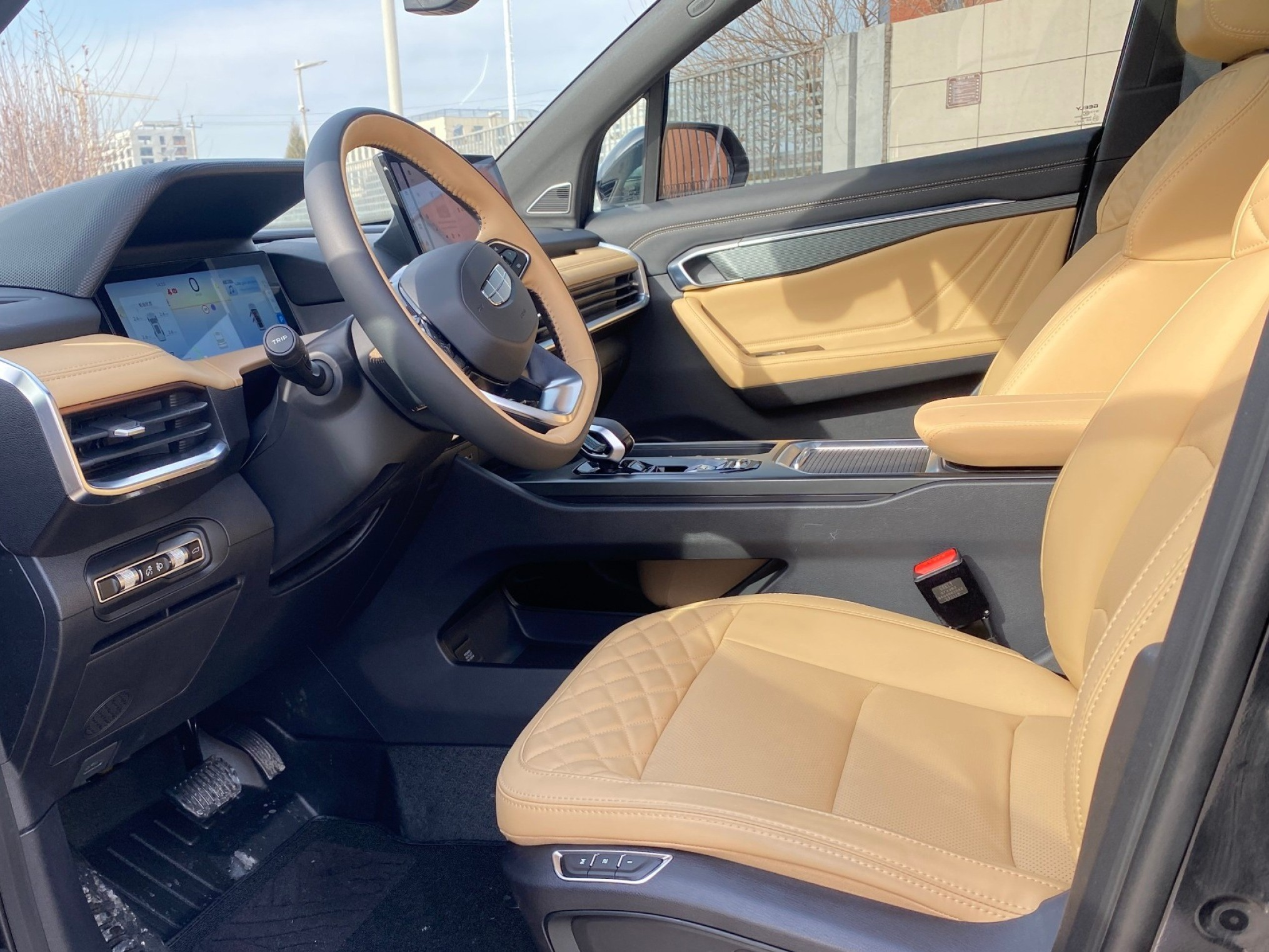
Interior

=== Markets ===
The second-generation Okavango was launched in Vietnam on 5 June 2026, with two variants: Executive and Premium, both variants are powered by the BHE15-EFZ 1.5-litre turbocharged petrol engine.

=== 2026 model year facelift ===
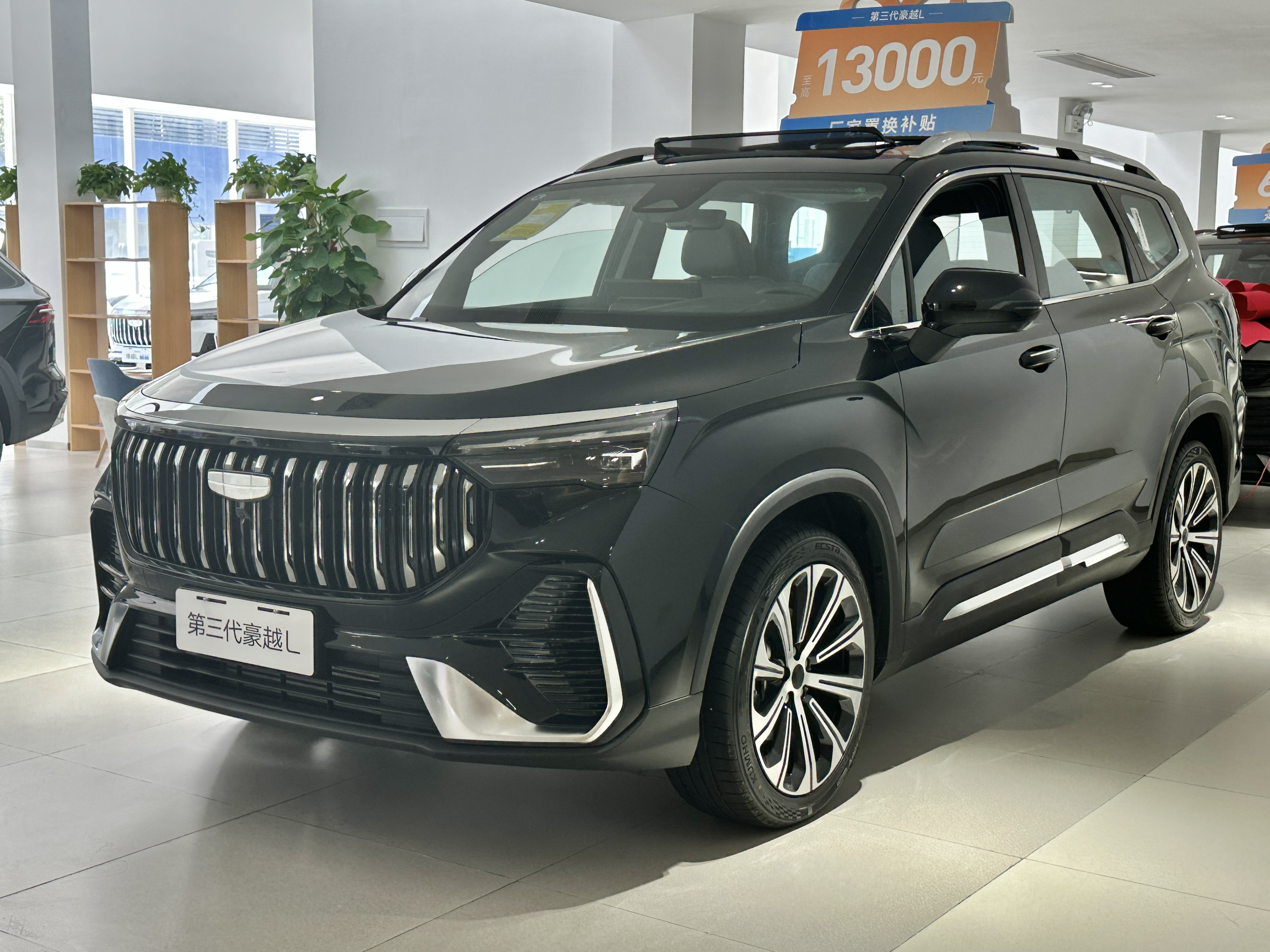
Haoyue L MY2026

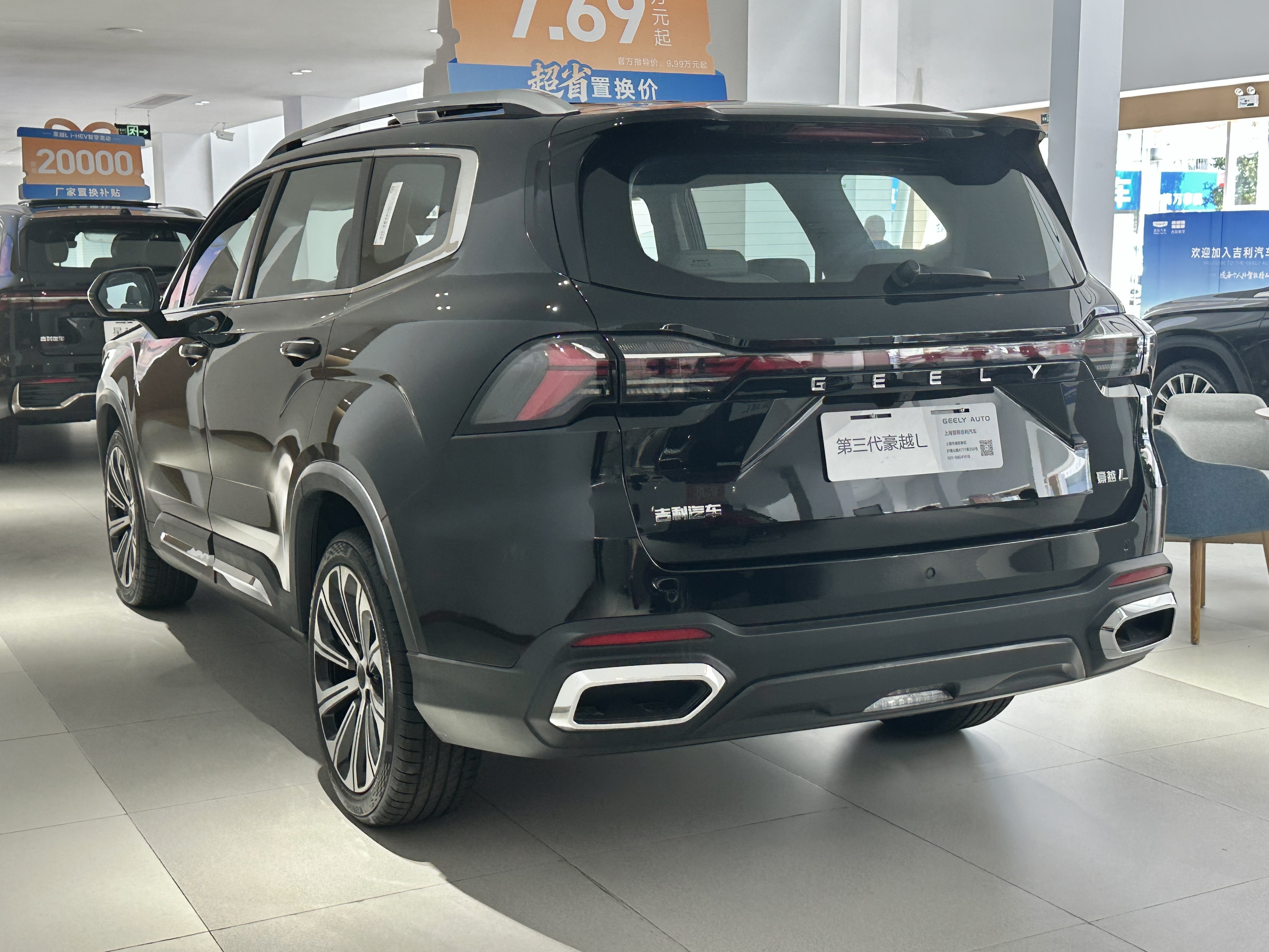
Rear

== Sales ==
Year	China		Malaysia (Note: Figures based on registration (Malaysia))	Mexico
Year	Geely Haoyue	Livan RL9	Proton X90	Okavango
2020	37,036	—		
2021	38,706	—		
2022	26,883			
2023	23,914+2,807	1,038	4,424	
2024	22,296+	1,547	3,286	262
2025	9,189+	221		194
