= K23 =

K23 may refer to:

- K-23 (Kansas highway)
- K23 (album), a 2022 album by Kenia Os
- "Conservati fedele", a concert aria by Wolfgang Amadeus Mozart
- Cooperstown-Westville Airport, in Otsego County, New York
- Honda K23 engine, an automobile engine
- HSwMS Kalmar (K23), a corvette of the Swedish Navy
- Kandi K23, a Chinese microvan
- R-23 (missile), a Soviet missile
- Shintoku Station, in Hokkaidō, Japan
- Soviet submarine K-23
