= Geely Yuanjing X3 =

Subcompact crossover SUV

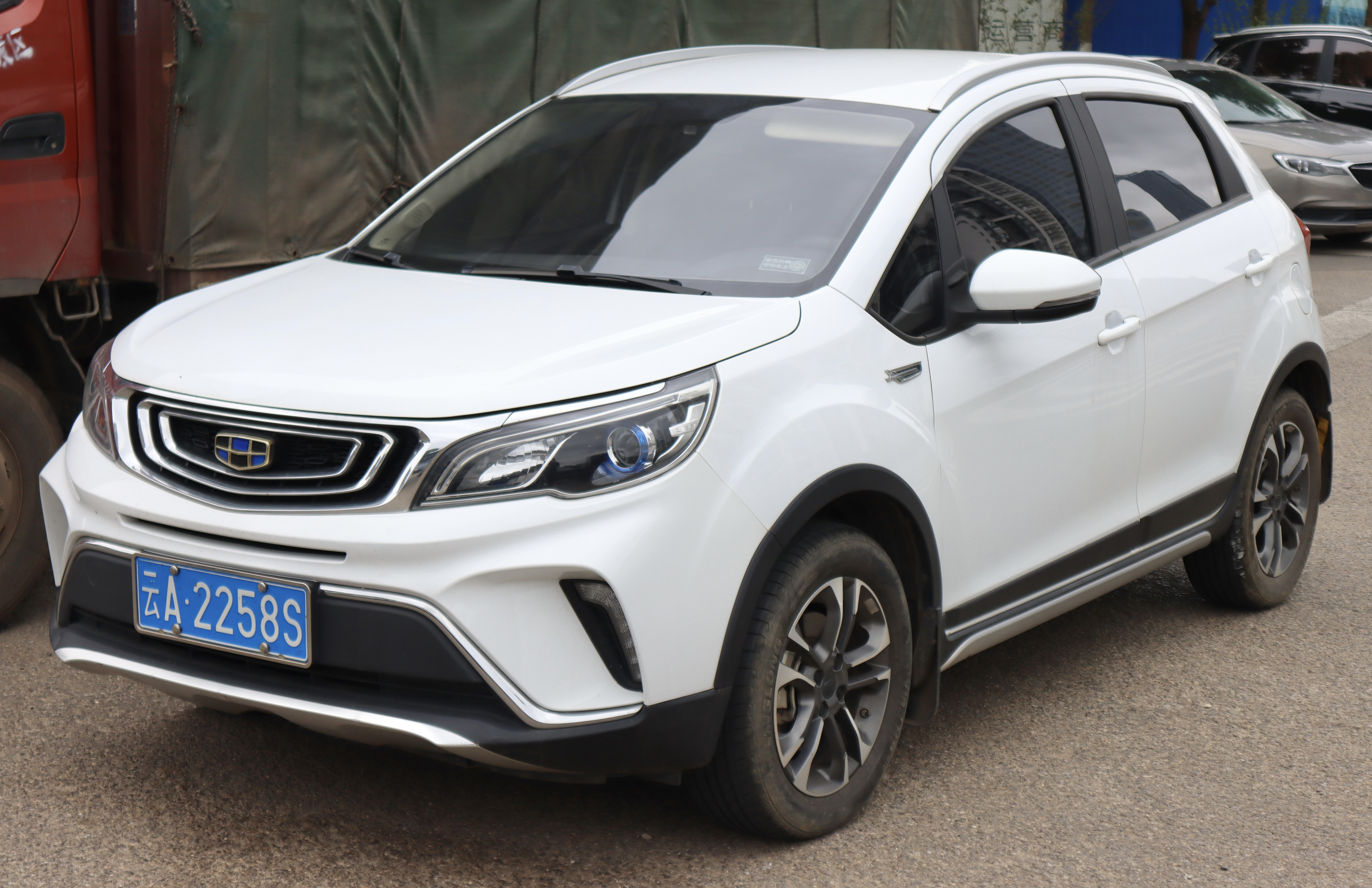

Overview
- Manufacturer: Geely Auto
- Also called: Geely Yuanjing V3 (during development); BAC X3 Pro (Iran); Geely GX3/GX3 Pro (Global); Maple X3 Pro (facelift rebadge variant) (Azerbaijan); Maple 30X (electric variant); Livan X3 Pro (2023–present); Kandi EX3 (electric variant, 2017); Geometry EX3 / Kungfu Cow (electric variant, 2021); EMC Wave 2 (Italy, 2023–2024); EMC 4 (Italy, 2025–present)
- Production: 2017–present; 2017–2023 (China)
- Assembly: China; Azerbaijan: Nakhchivan (NAZ); Iran: Bam (BAC)

Body and chassis
- Class: subcompact SUV
- Body style: 5-door hatchback
- Layout: Front-engine, front-wheel-drive layout
- Related: Geely Englon SC5-RV; Geometry E

Powertrain
- Engine: 1.5 L 4G15 I4 (gasoline)
- Transmission: 5-speed manual 4-speed automatic

Dimensions
- Wheelbase: 2,480 mm (97.6 in)
- Length: 4,005 mm (157.7 in)
- Width: 1,760 mm (69.3 in)
- Height: 1,560 mm (61.4 in)

Chronology
- Predecessor: Geely Englon SC5-RV
- Successor: Geometry E (for Geometry EX3 / Kungfu Cow)

The Geely Yuanjing X3 is a subcompact SUV produced by Chinese manufacturer Geely Auto. An electric variant featuring a special color and trim redesign was rebadged as the Geometry EX3 or Kungfu Cow under the Geometry brand from 2021.

== Overview ==
The Geely Yuanjing X3 was revealed in July 2017, and debuted in Q3 2017. The Yuanjing X3 was formerly known as the Yuanjing V3 during development, and was renamed prior to launch to fit into the later confirmed Geely Yuanjing crossover product series slotting between the Geely Yuanjing X1 and Geely Yuanjing X6.

The Yuanjing X3 is based on the Geely Englon SC5-RV from 2011 to 2014, and utilizes the same engine, a 1.5 liter engine previously producing 94 hp for the Englon SC5-RV. The same 1.5 liter engine was tuned up to 102 hp and mated to a 5-speed manual gearbox or a 4-speed automatic gearbox.

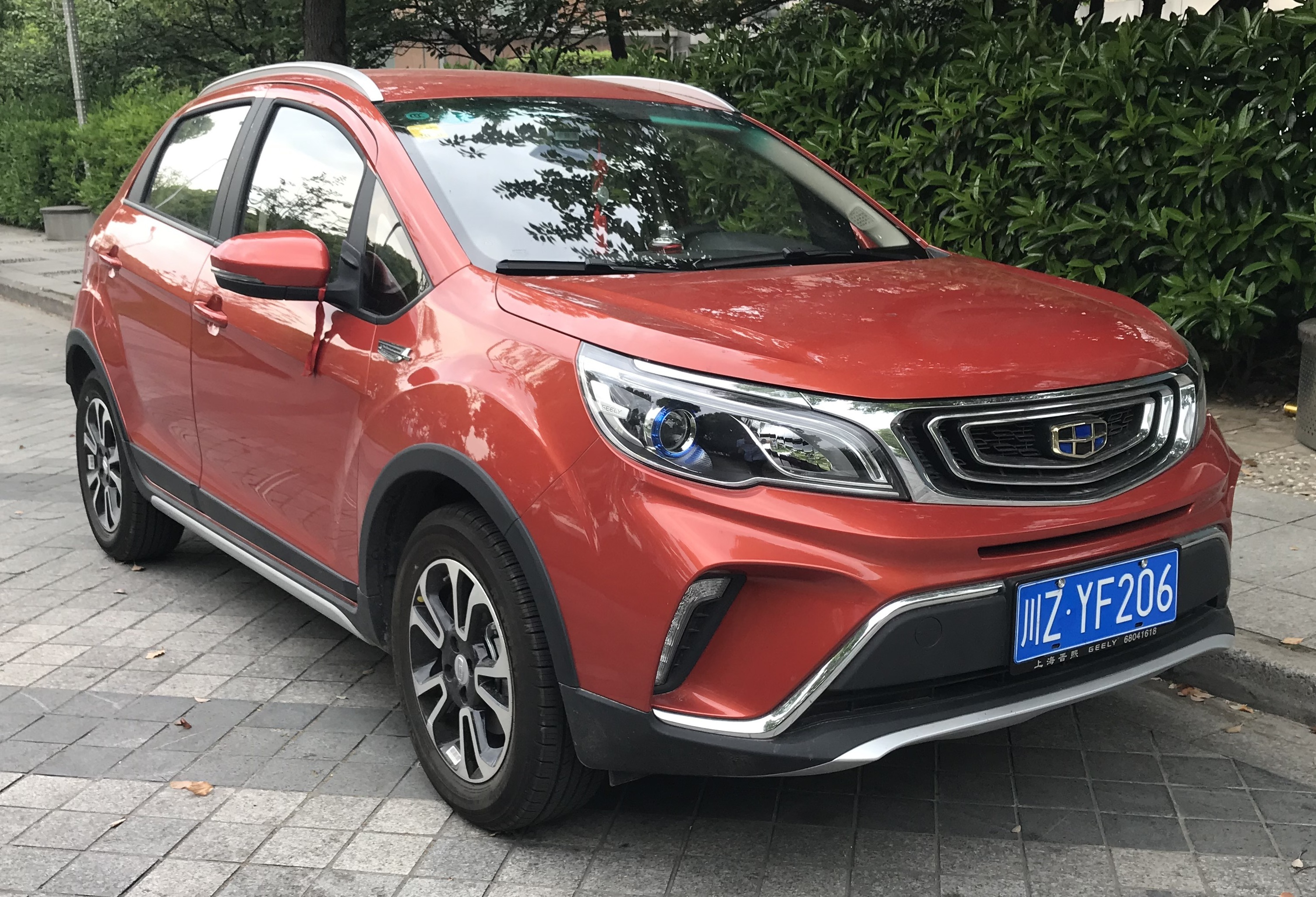
Geely Yuanjing X3

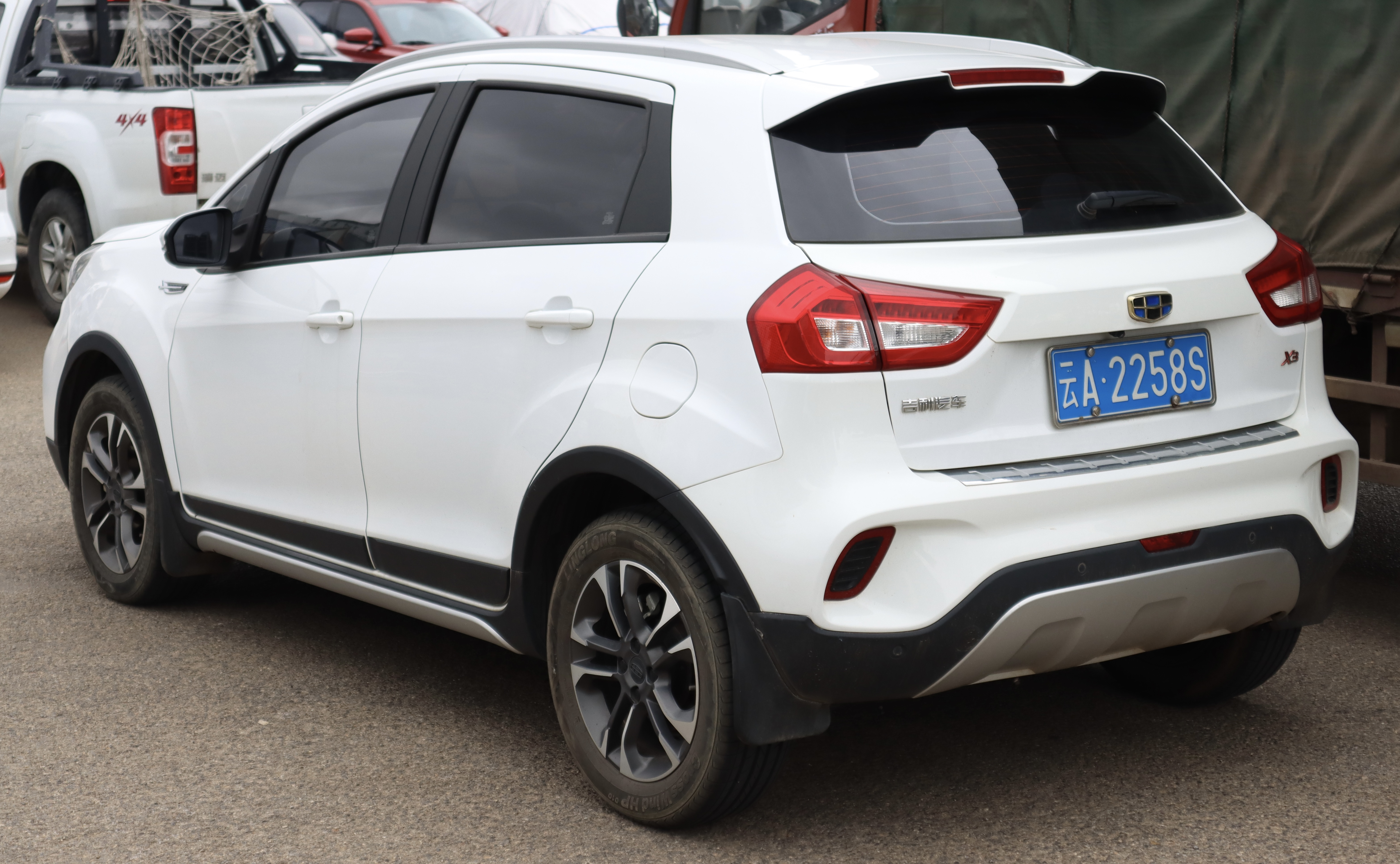
Rear view

=== Geely Yuanjing X3 Pro ===
A facelift was launched in April 2021 called the Yuanjing X3 Pro. The X3 Pro update is powered by a 1.5-liter engine producing 102 hp and mated to a CVT gearbox. The Yuanjing X3 Pro was also rebadged and launched in May 2022 as the Maple X3 Pro as the first pure gasoline-powered vehicle under the relaunched Maple brand.

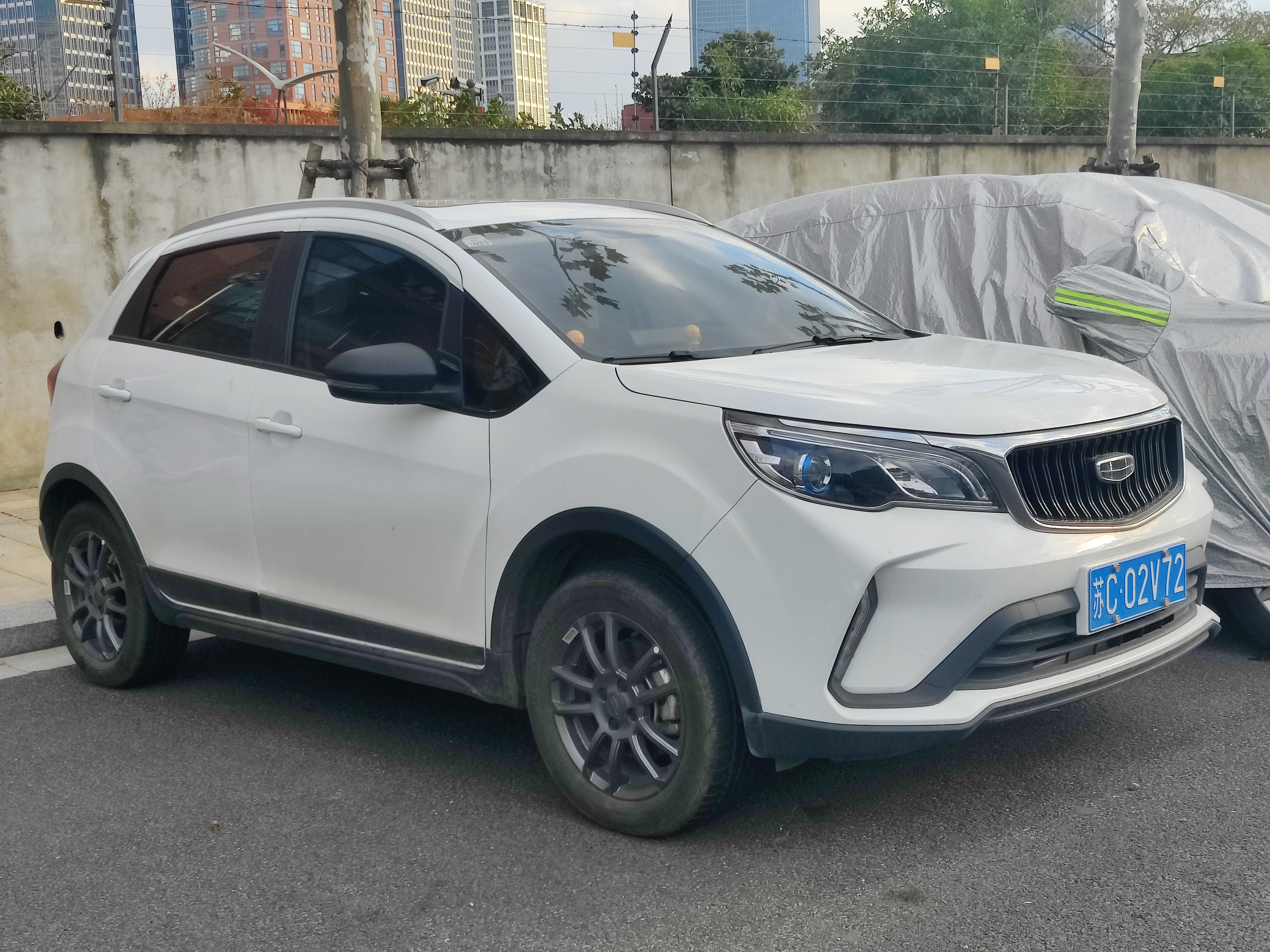
Geely Yuanjing X3 Pro

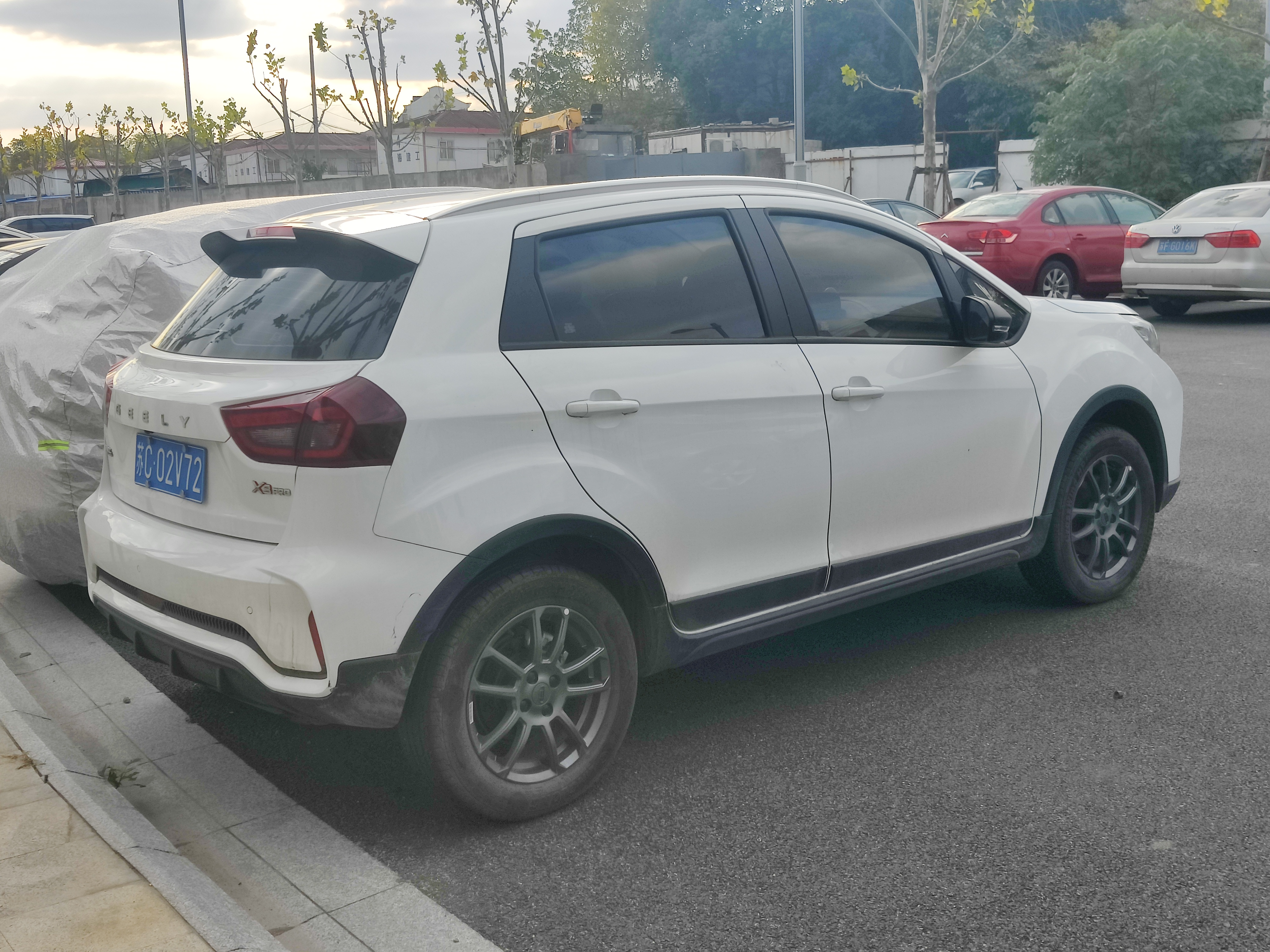
Rear view

== Kandi EX3 (K26) ==
The Kandi EX3 was Launched originally as the Kandi K26 in 2017 as Kandi's first electric SUV. The EX3 offers a range of approximately 380 km (240 miles) and a top speed of 110 km/h (68 mph). It was the first electrified version of the Geely Yuanjing X3 platform. At launch, the EX3 is eligible for tax exemptions under China’s NEV (New Energy Vehicle) policy and U.S. federal EV tax credits.

== Maple 30X ==
The Maple 30X is a subcompact electric crossover SUV based on the Geely Yuanjing X3 with the exterior body being essentially a rebadge. The Maple 30X result of a partnership between Geely and Kandi Technologies. It was launched by the affiliate company of Kandi Technologies Group, Inc., Fengsheng Automotive in July 2020. Fengsheng also launched a mobility version of the Maple 30X customized for the urban mobility market.

The motor of the Maple 30X has a maximum output of 70 kW (94 hp) and a maximum torque of 180N.m, the electric driving range on one full charge is up to 306 km or 190 miles. The Maple 30X comes with express charging and standard charging options. Express charging enables the vehicle to be charged to 80% in 30 minutes. A home plug-in charging feature is also available for all future Maple brand electric vehicles.

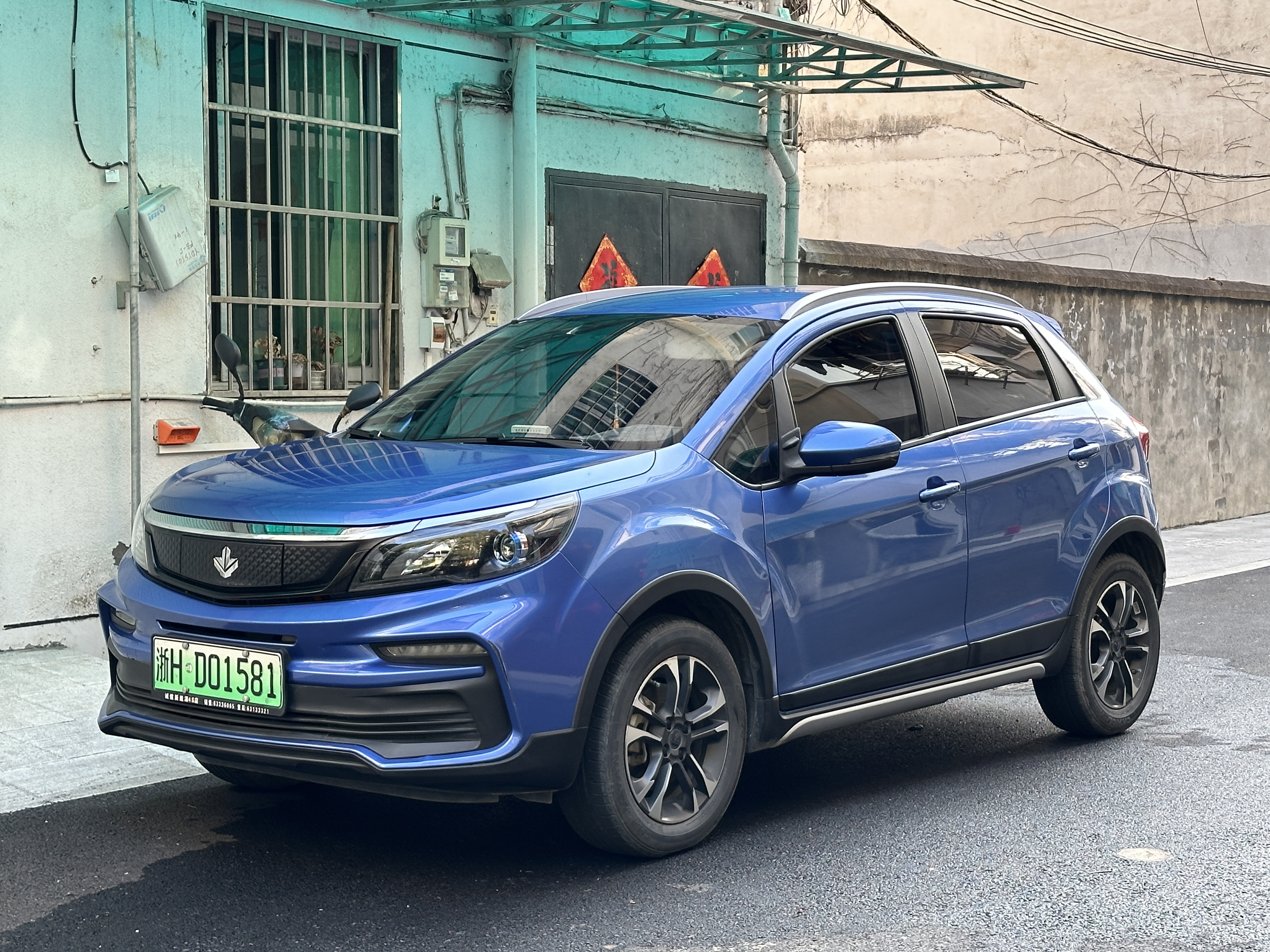
Maple 30X

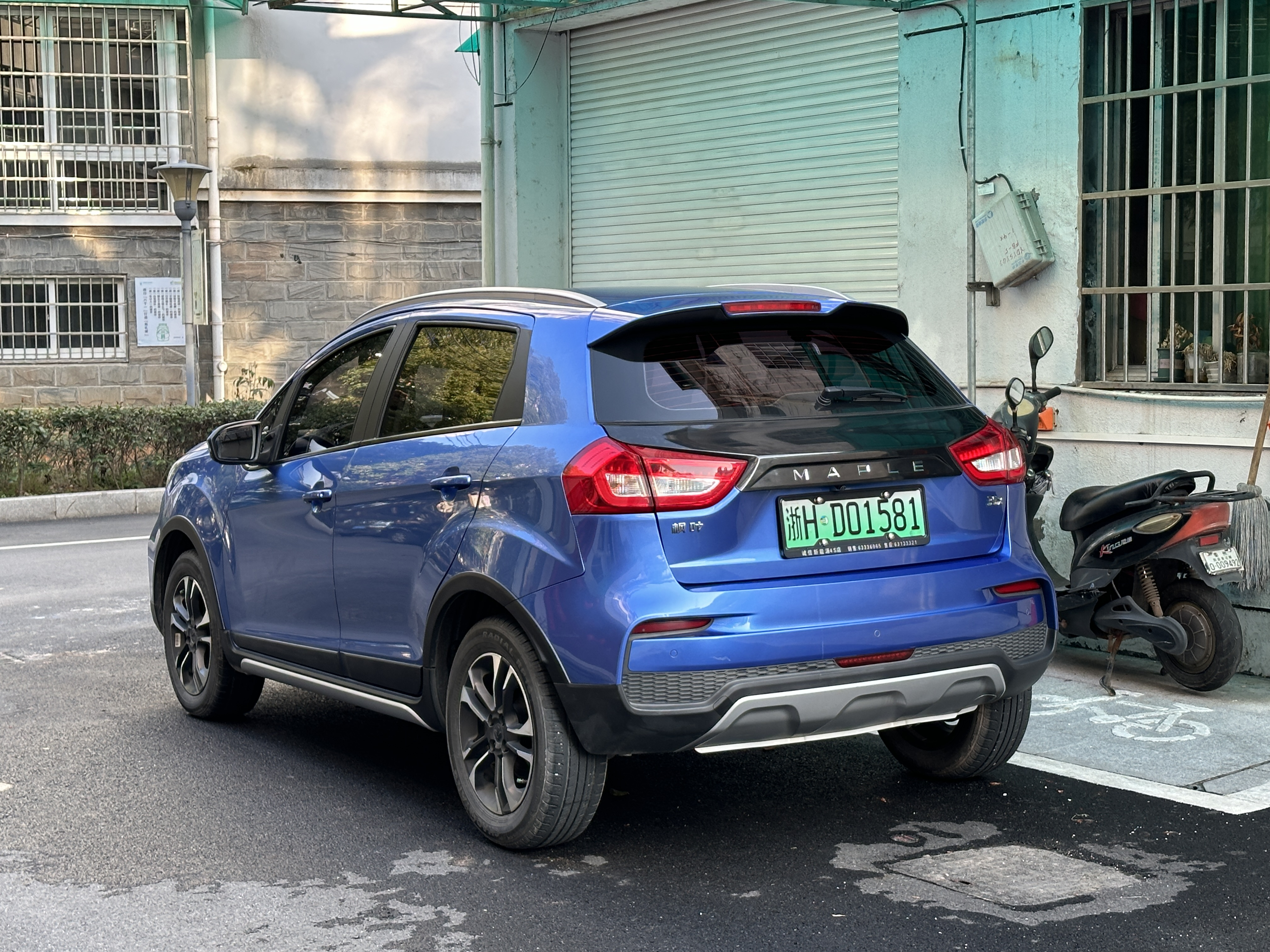
Rear view

== Geometry EX3 ==
The Geometry EX3 launched in 2021 is a subcompact electric crossover SUV based on the Geely Yuanjing X3. It comes with a 37.23 kWh battery providing a claimed range of 322 kilometers (200 miles). The EX3 was only sold in 2021 and was replaced by the completely redesigned Geometry E in 2022.

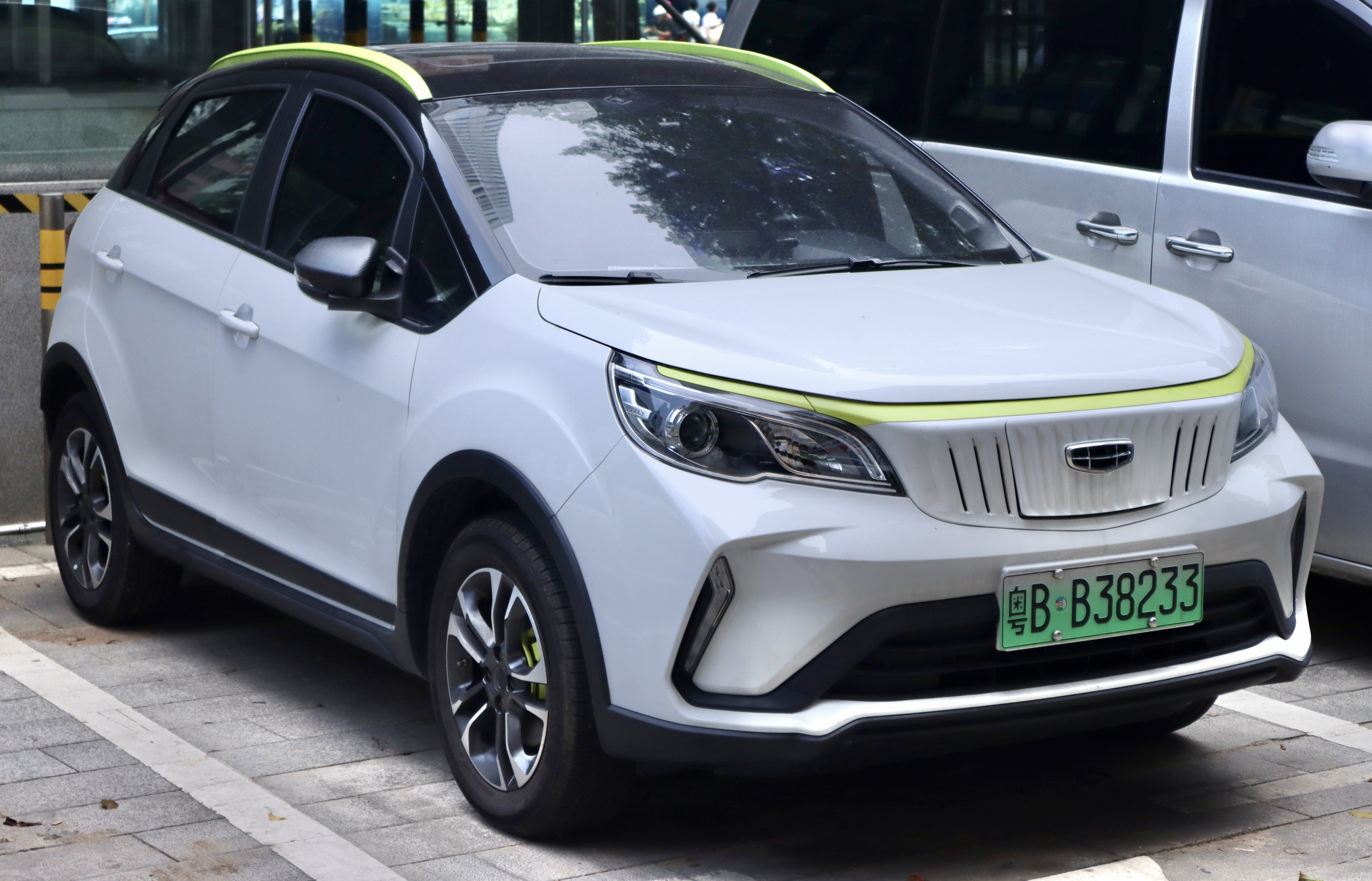
Geometry EX3

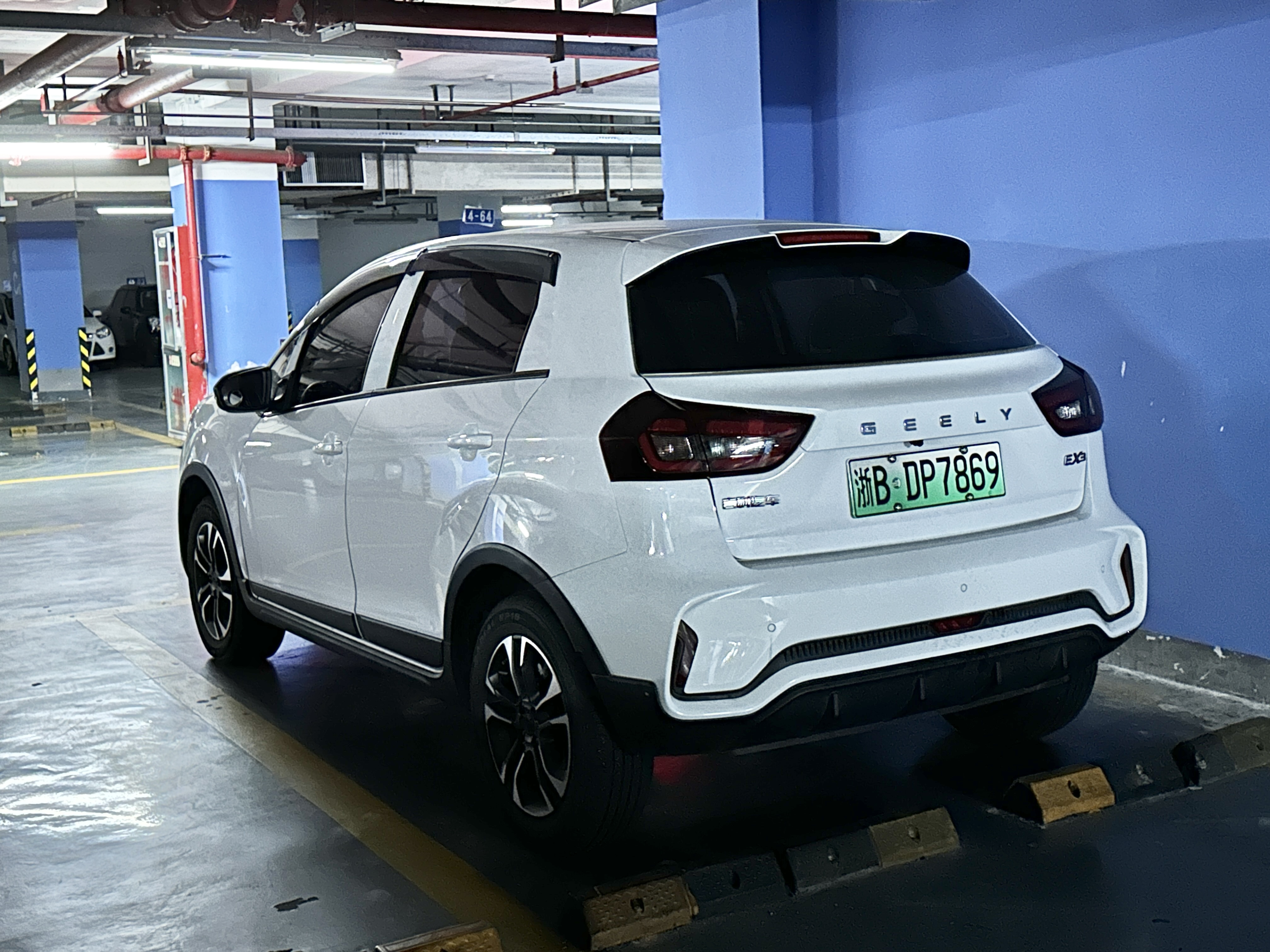
Rear view
