= Englon SC5-RV =

Subcompact car

Englon SC5
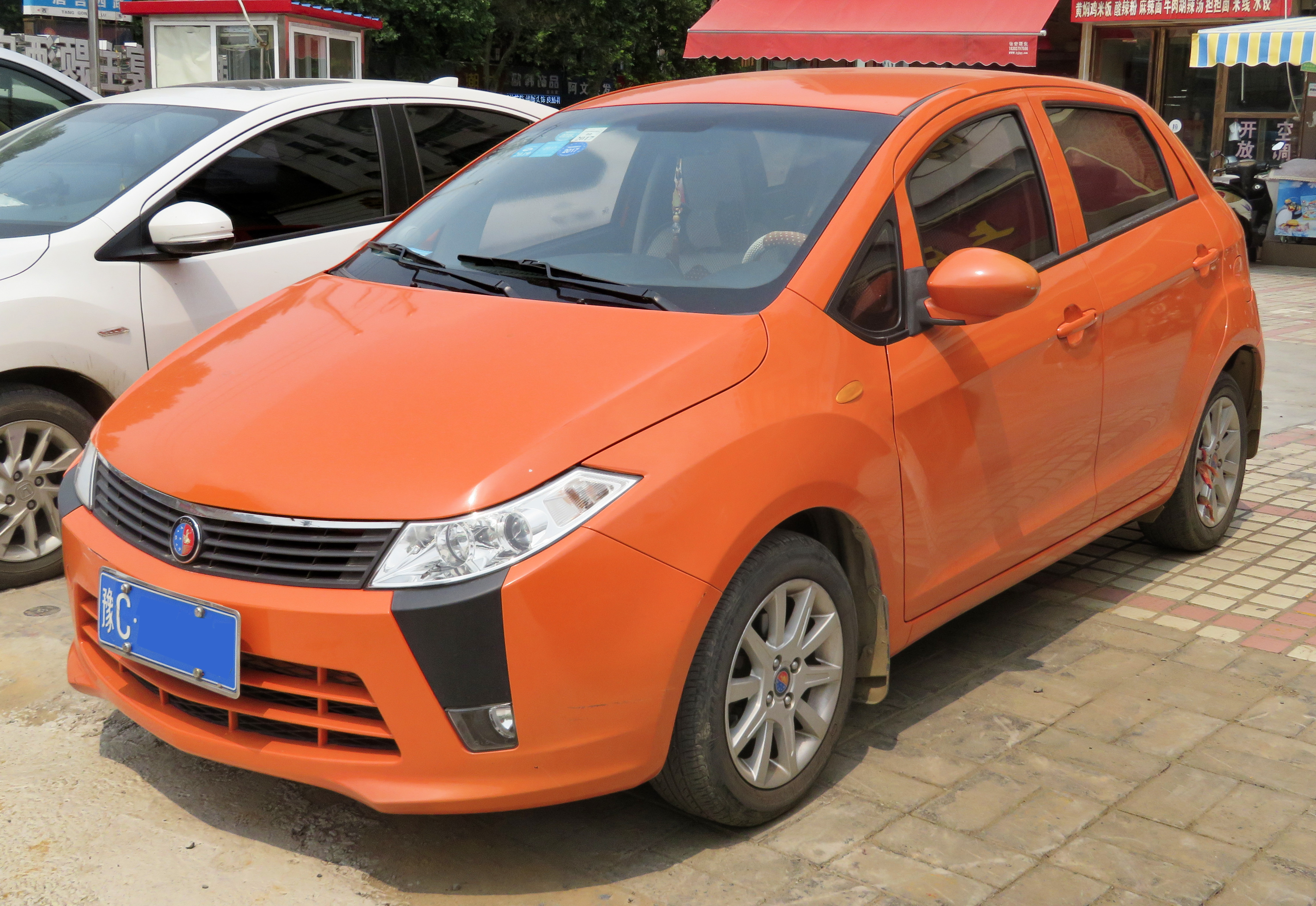

Overview
- Manufacturer: Englon (Geely Auto)
- Also called: Geely Englon SX5 (crossover); Geely GLEagle GC5 (sedan); Kandi K17A EV
- Production: 2011–2015

Body and chassis
- Class: subcompact car
- Body style: 5-door hatchback 4-door sedan
- Layout: Front-engine, front-wheel-drive
- Related: Geely Yuanjing X3

Powertrain
- Engine: 1.3 L I4; 1.5 L MR479QA I4
- Transmission: 5 speed manual

Dimensions
- Wheelbase: 2,461 mm (96.9 in)
- Length: 3,919 mm (154.3 in)
- Width: 1,745 mm (68.7 in)
- Height: 1,505 mm (59.3 in)
- Curb weight: 1,258–1,310 kg (2,773–2,888 lb)

Chronology
- Successor: Geely Yuanjing X3

The Englon SC5-RV is a subcompact hatchback produced by Chinese automobile manufacturer Englon. It debuted as a concept at the 2010 Beijing Auto Show. Price ranges from 52.300 yuan to 56.300 yuan.

== Overview ==
=== Safety ===
In 2013 the Englon SC5-RV received 5 stars during the crash test commissioned and tested by the C-NCAP in Tianjin, China.

=== Facelift ===
A facelift was conducted in 2013 with revised front bumper, rear bumper, and light units.

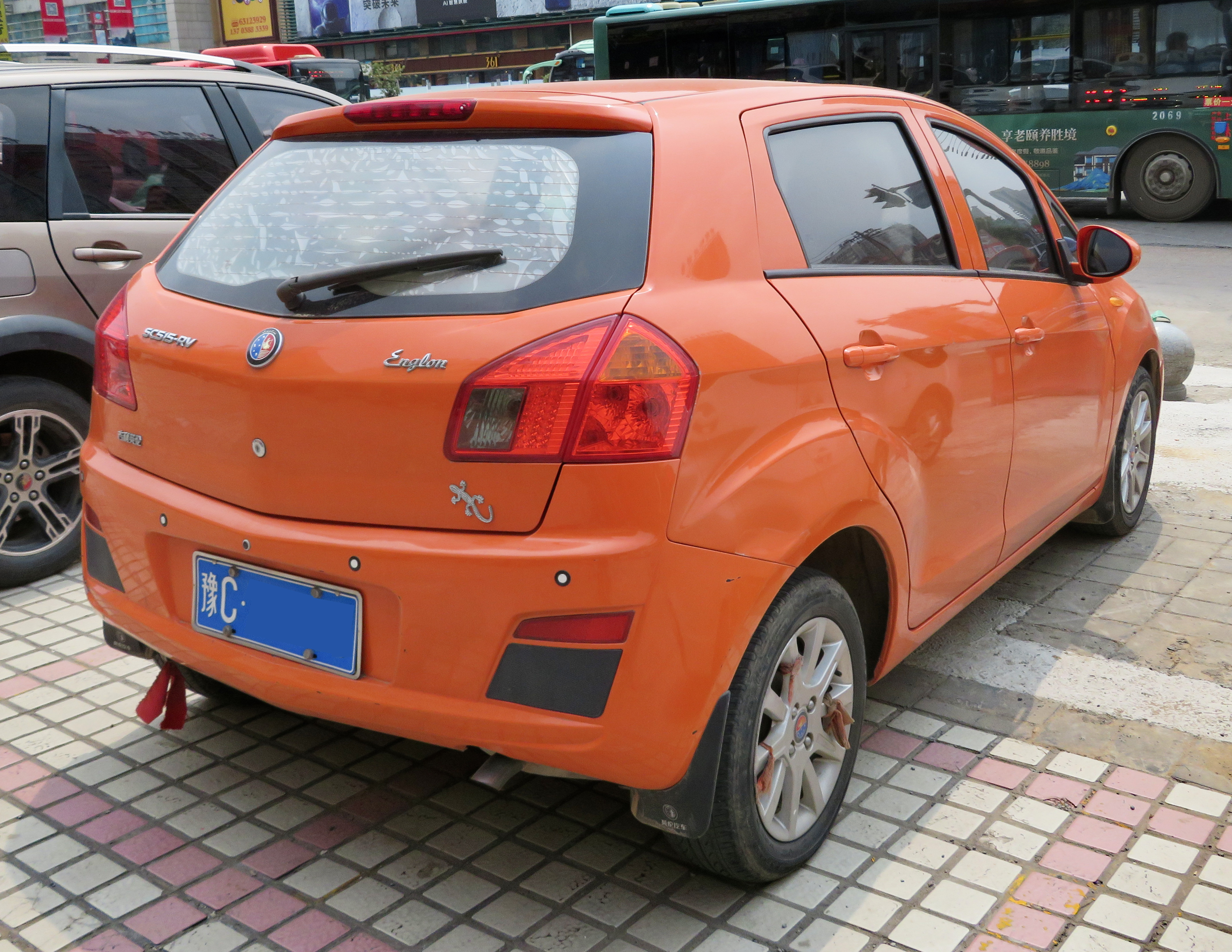
Rear view of an Englon SC5-RV

=== Englon SX5 ===
A subcompact SUV based on the Englon SC5-RV hatchback call the Englon SX5 was launched shortly after. Which is essentially the Geely Englon SC5-RV slightly lifted with different bumpers and plastic cladding.

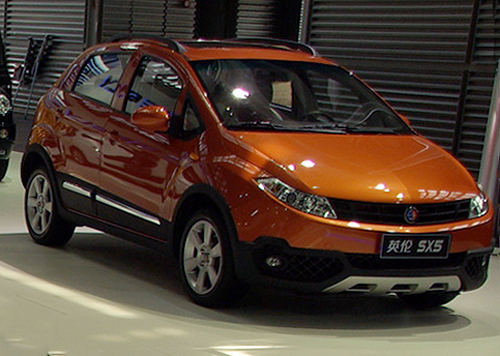
Englon SX5 at the 2011 Shenzhen-Hong Kong-Macau International Auto Show.

=== Geely GLEagle GC5 ===
The Geely GLEagle GC5 debuted at the Beijing Auto Show in April as a sedan variant of the Englon SC5-RV, and was listed in early 2011.

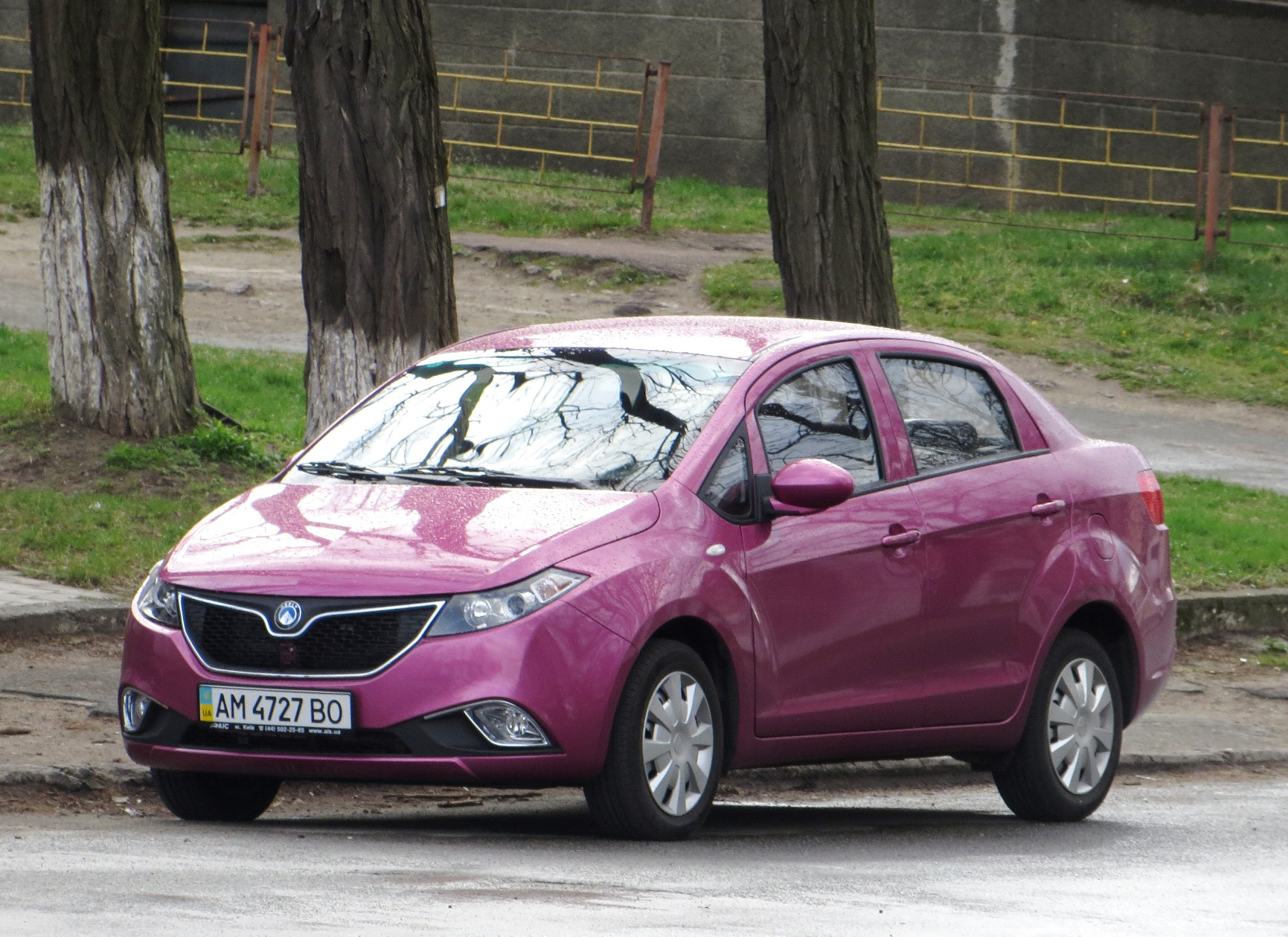
Geely (GLEagle) GC5

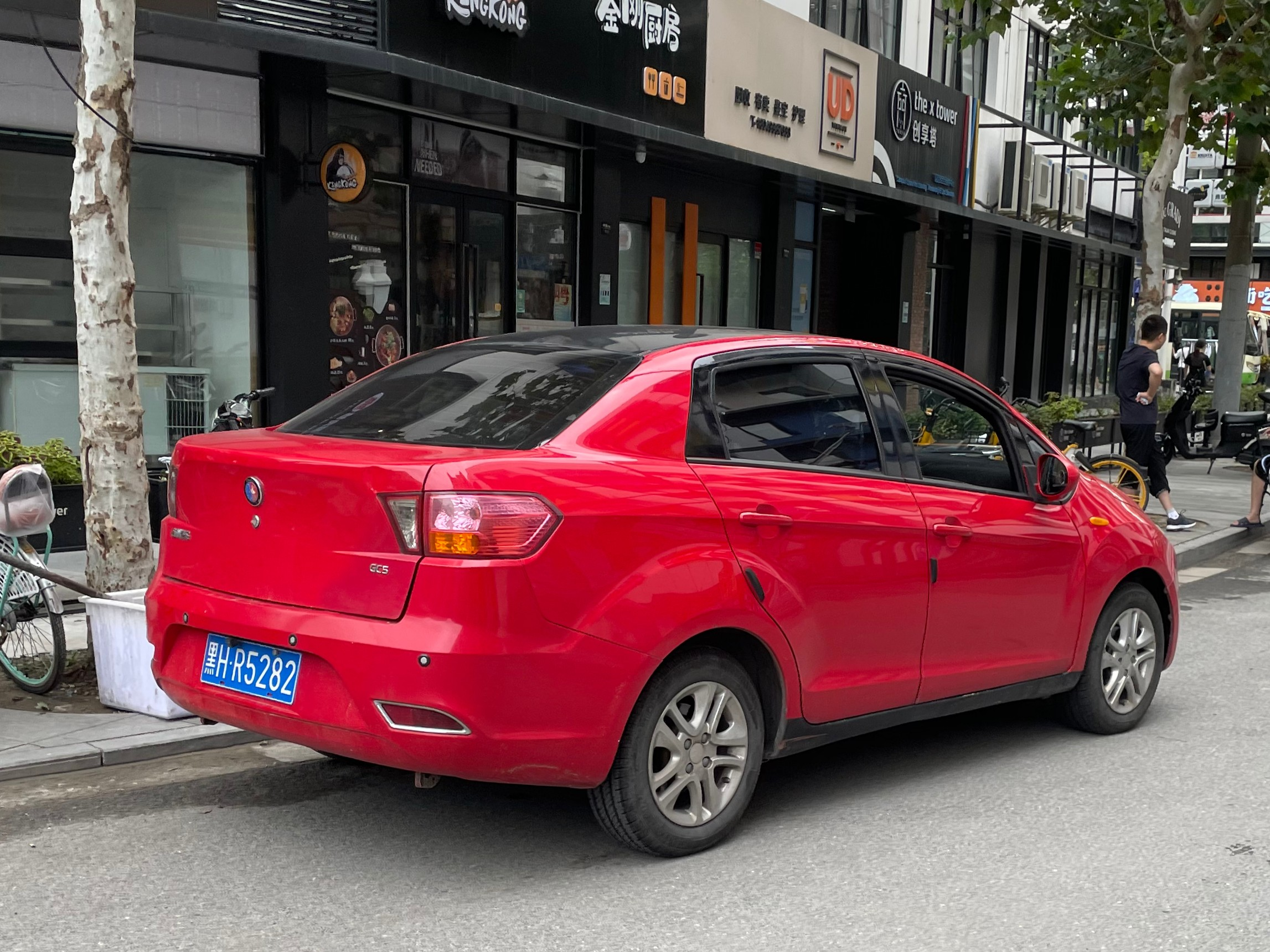
GC5 rear

== Kandi K17A EV ==
The K17A debuted on August 5, 2016, as the first product of Kandi Technologies. From the exterior, the Kandi K17A EV was essentially a rebadged Englon SC5-RV, and the vehicle was originally built for the Kandi EV CarShare, a carsharing program in the city of Hangzhou. The system operates only with Kandi EV all-electric cars, which are available to customers in automated garages that run like vending machines. The leasing option, called "Long Lease," is available from 1- to 3-year contracts.

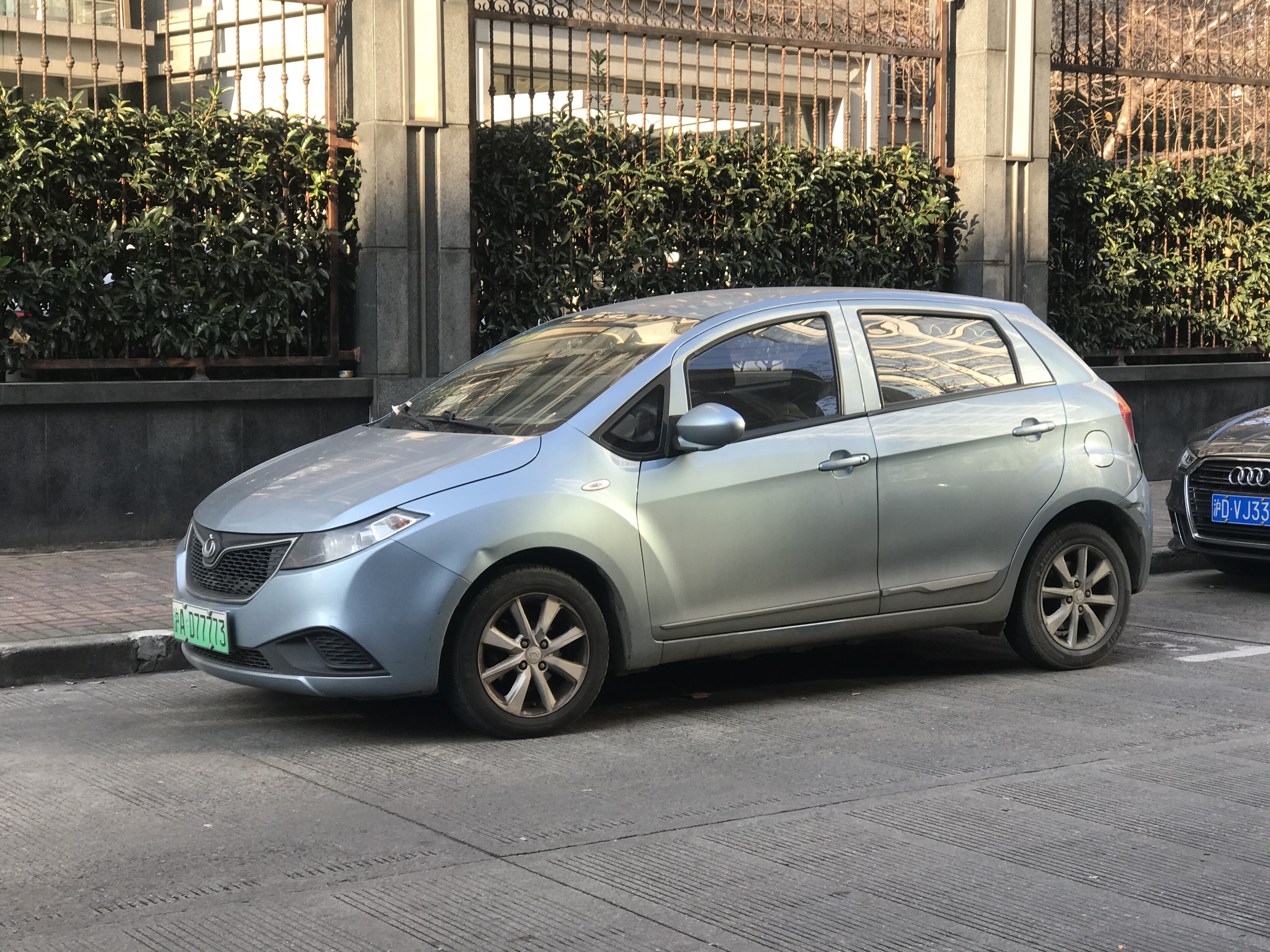
Front quarter view of a Kandi K17A EV

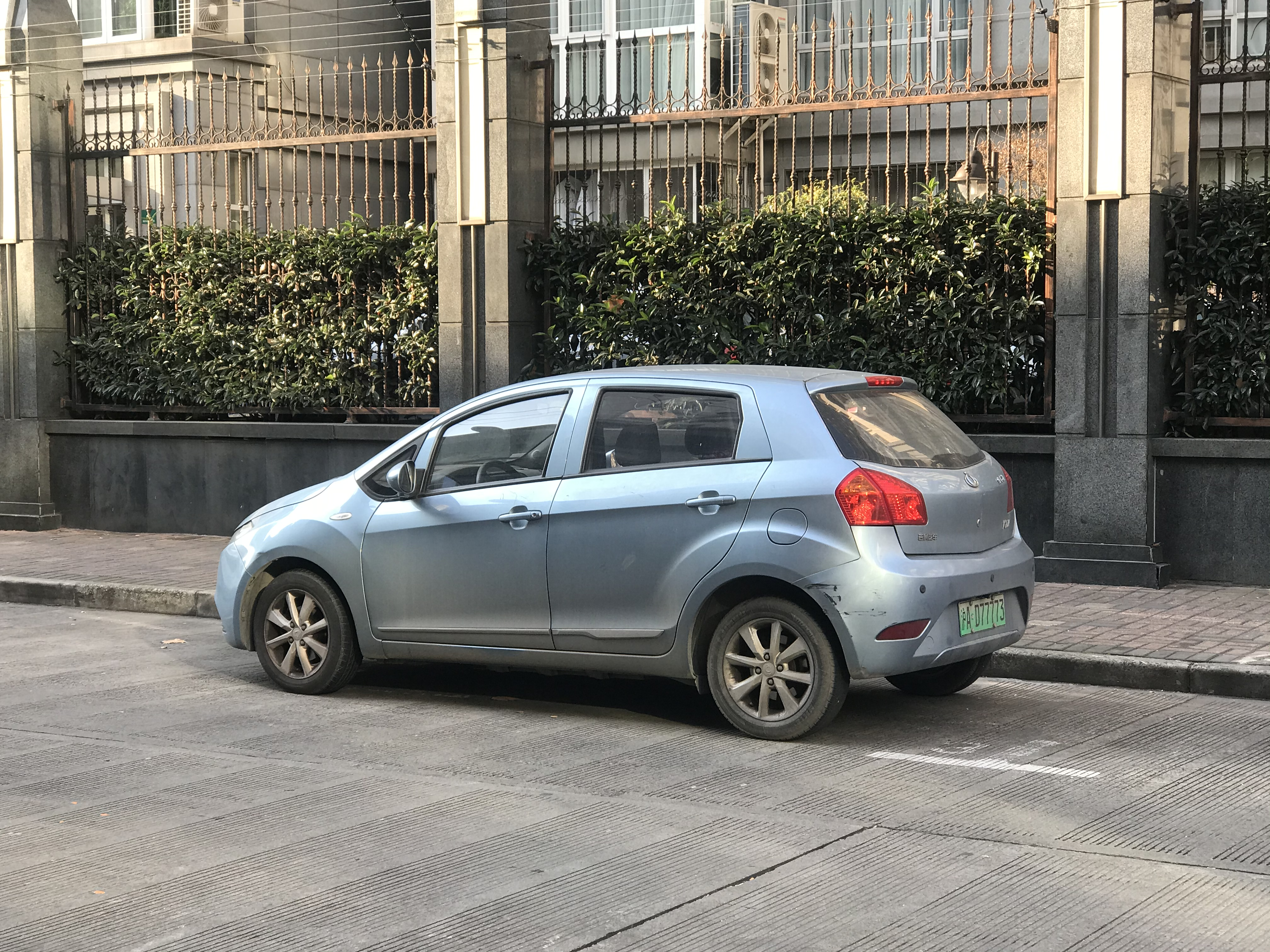
Rear quarter view of a Kandi K17A EV

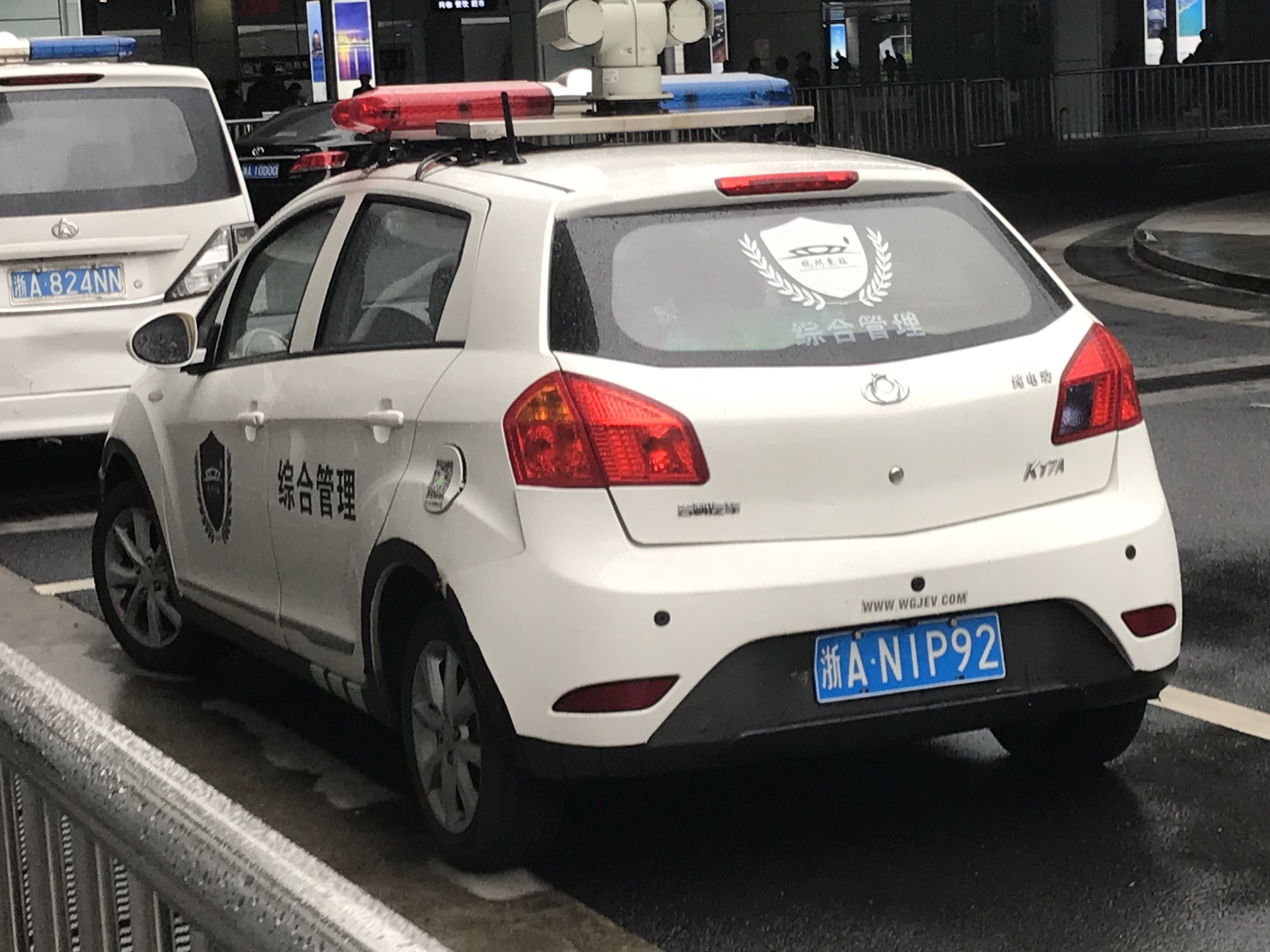
Rear view of a Kandi K17A EV police cruiser in Hangzhou, China.
