= Kandi Coco =

Chinese model of battery electric vehicle

The Kandi Coco or Kandi KD08E is a small electric vehicle first available in the US in 2009, built by Kandi Technologies. For a short time, this vehicle was available with a large US tax credit and an additional tax credit in the state of Oklahoma, bringing the take-home cost of the vehicle to under US$1000. A gasoline version of the vehicle, the KD08A, was also available.

As of February 2013, the Kandi has indicated the vehicle is still available for import to the US. The original vehicle from 2009 was advertised as a "neighborhood electric vehicle" with a top speed of 25MPH and a maximum range of 60 miles per charge. Later models have been advertised with a slightly updated body, a 6 kW/8 hp motor, and a top speed of 35MPH.

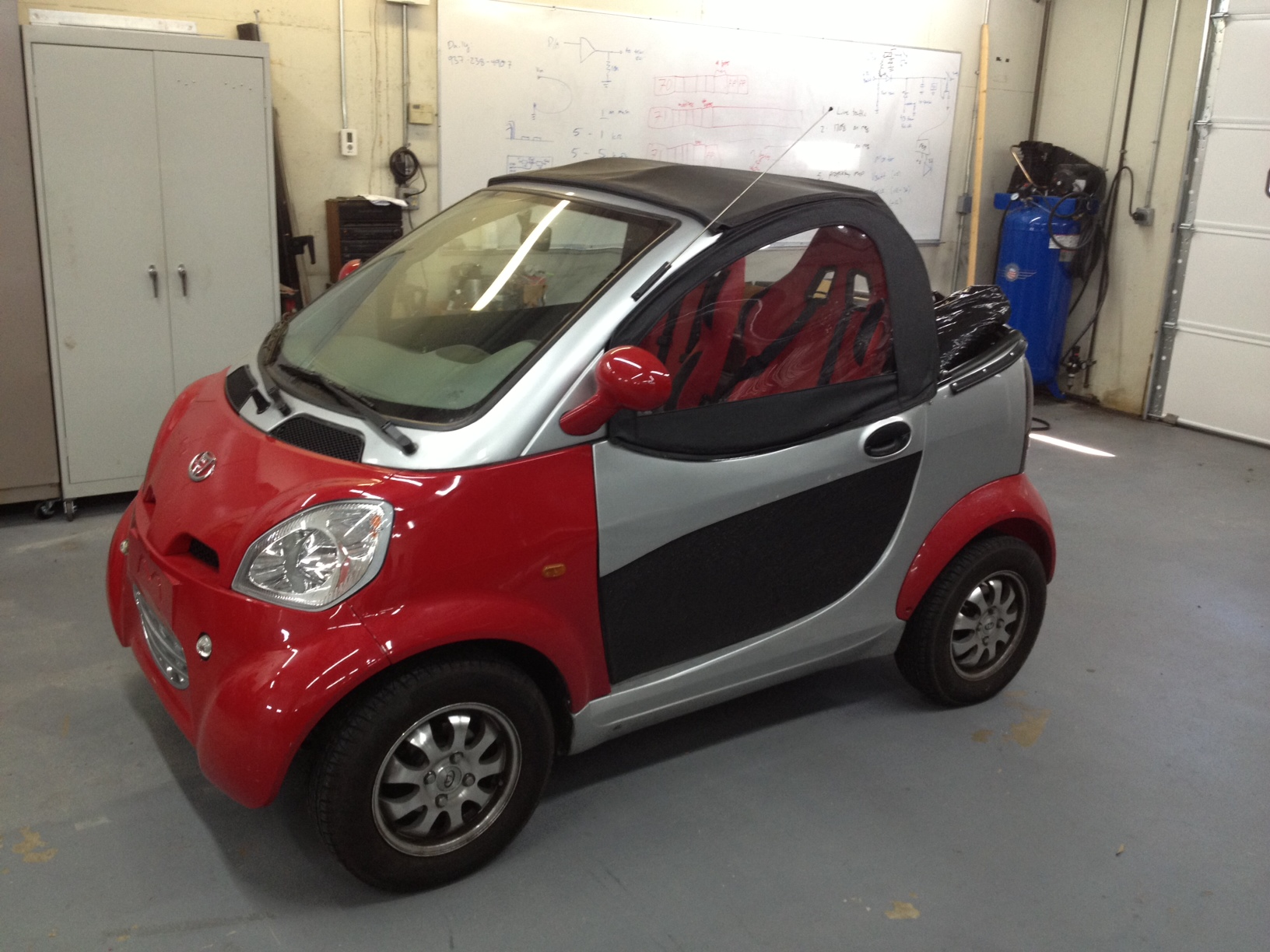
The Kandi Coco small electric vehicle.

== Specifications ==
- 72V 4 kW or 6 kW 3-phase AC induction motor
- 6 deep-cycle 12-volt Lead-Acid batteries
- Integrated battery conditioning and charging system
- 4-wheel disc brakes
