= Kandi K27 =

Battery electric city car

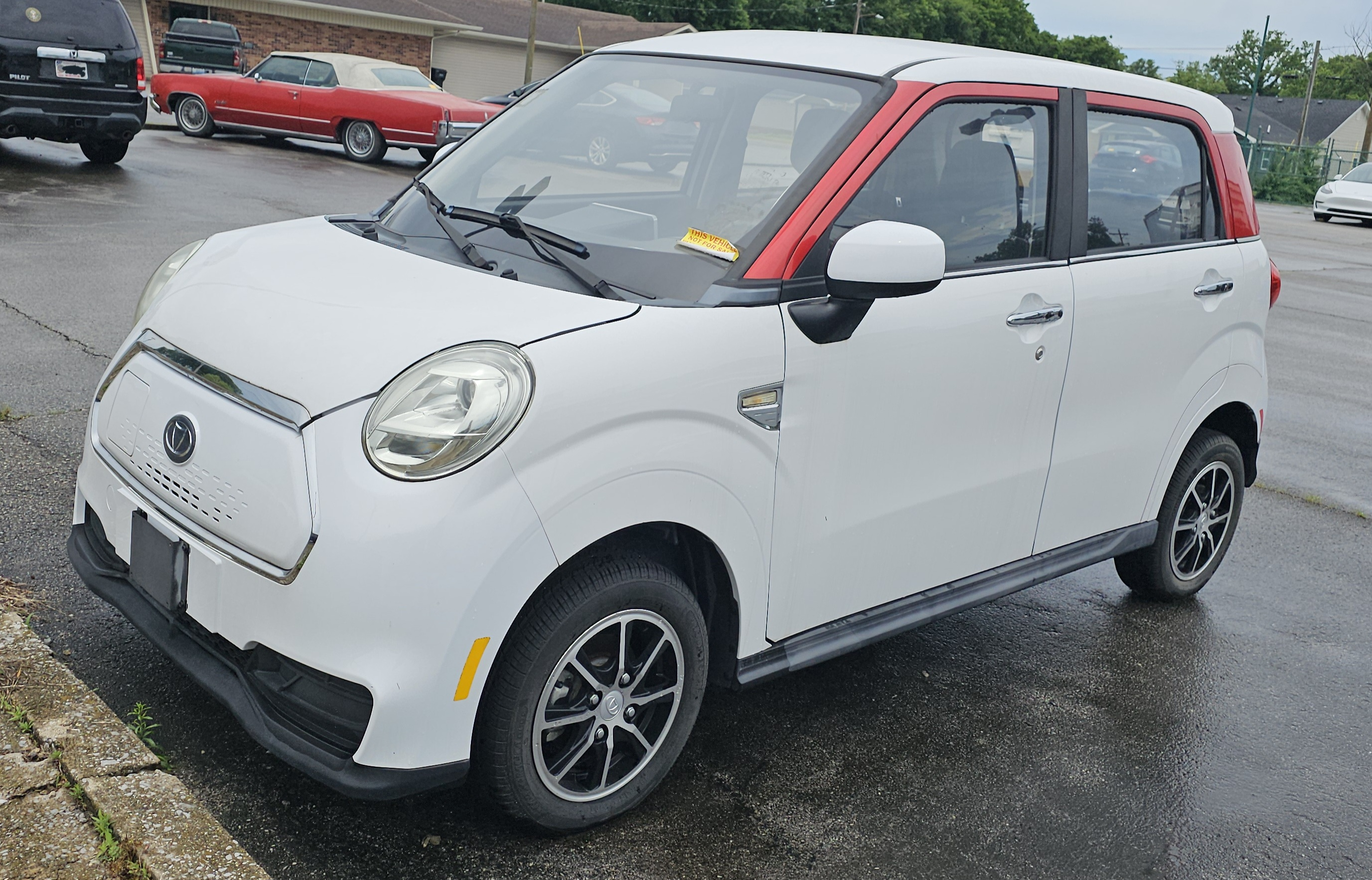

Overview
- Manufacturer: Kandi Technologies
- Also called: Lingbao Box; SiTech AEVS
- Production: August 2018 – 2021 (Kandi K27); April 2020 – present (Lingbao Box); 2018–2020 (SiTech AEVS)
- Assembly: China: Changxing

Body and chassis
- Class: City car (A)
- Body style: 5-door hatchback
- Layout: Front-engine, front-wheel-drive layout

Dimensions
- Wheelbase: 2,455 mm (96.7 in)
- Length: 3,460 mm (136.2 in)
- Width: 1,470 mm (57.9 in)
- Height: 1,615 mm (63.6 in)
- Curb weight: 1,240 kg (2,734 lb)

The Kandi K27 is a battery electric city car produced by the Chinese manufacturer Kandi Technologies.

== Overview ==
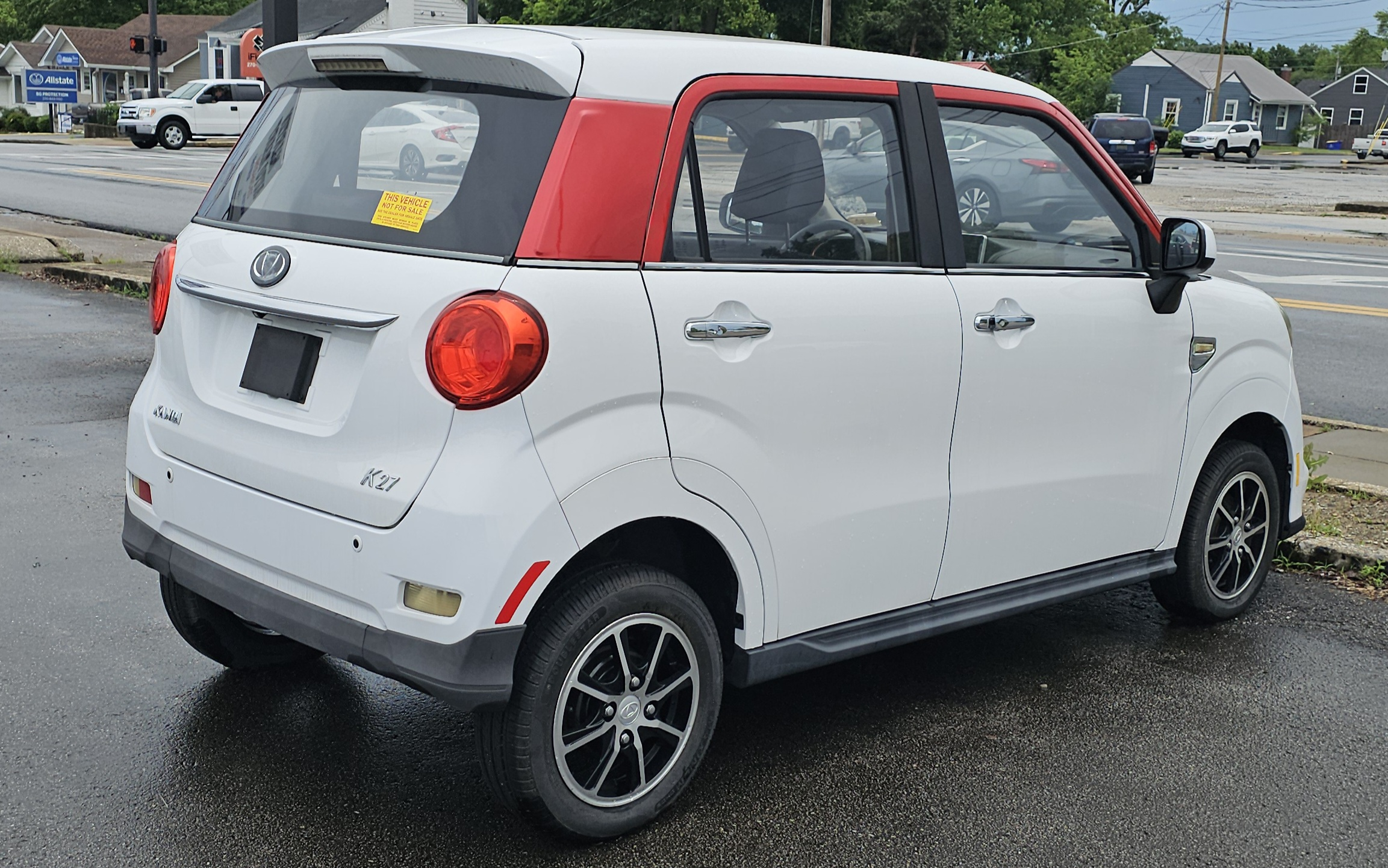
Rear view

In August 2018, the Kandi was began selling a new, small model of electric car in the form of a five-door hatchback. The K27's overall design is copied from the Daihatsu Cast kei car, strongly resembling the Fiat 500L.

== Production ==
The K27 is the first vehicle in the company history to be sold in the United States along with the larger K23 outside the Chinese market. As a result, federal tax breaks, at $12,299 for the cheapest copy, the K27 is the cheapest new electric car to buy in the country.

== Specifications ==
The K27 drive system is made of a 17.69 kWh battery, which ensures a maximum range on a single charge of up to 160 kilometers (100 miles) and a top speed of 101 km/h.

== Rebadged variants ==
=== Lingbao Box ===
Lingbao Box

The Lingbao Box is a rebadged variant of the K27 sold under the Lingbao brand, which forms part of Jiangsu Jemmell New Energy Vehicle Industry company (吉麦新能源汽车) or simply Jemmell. The particular model is also called the Jemmell C01.

The Box is powered by a single electric motor delivering 61 hp and 110 lb-ft (150 Nm) of torque powering the front wheels. A compact 18 kWh battery pack capable of 93 miles (150 km) of range is connected to the motor.

=== SiTech AEVS ===
The SiTech AEVS is a SiTech's third product and is also based on the K27.
