= Kandi Technologies =

Chinese battery and electric vehicle manufacturer

Kandi Technology Group, Inc.
- Company type: Public
- Traded as: Nasdaq: KNDI
- Industry: Automotive
- Founded: 2002; 24 years ago in Jinhua, Zhejiang
- Founder: Hu Xiaoming
- Headquarters: Jinhua, Zhejiang
- Area served: China, United States
- Products: Automobiles, electric vehicles
- Subsidiaries: Zhejiang Kandi Electric Vehicles (50%); SC Autosports LLC
- Website: www.kandigroup.com

Kandi Technology Group, Inc. (Chinese: 康迪) is a Chinese manufacturer of batteries and electric vehicles. The company is listed on the NASDAQ stock exchange under the ticker symbol KNDI. It was founded in 2002 in Jinhua, Zhejiang by Hu Xiaoming.

== History ==
In February 2013, Kandi Technology and Shanghai Maple, a subsidiary of Geely, announced the formation of a joint venture, Zhejiang Kandi Electric Vehicles Investment Co. Ltd., with equal ownership and an initial registered capital of 1 billion yuan (US$160 million). It focused on research, development, production, marketing, and sales of electric vehicles in mainland China. The agreement was officially signed on March 22, 2013.

Chairman of GeelyAuto, Li Shufu served as the joint venture's first Chairman, while Hu Xiaoming, Chairman and CEO of Kandi, was appointed General Manager.

In 2016, Geely Auto sold its stake in the joint venture to Geely Holding Group, which Li Shufu controls.

Kandi has also partnered with Geely to sell electric vehicles under the Gleagle brand. The partnership resulted in the development of the EX3 model, with Geely providing design input and Kandi handling manufacturing.

=== EV Car Share ===
In July 2012, Kandi Technology signed a cooperation agreement with the city of Hangzhou to supply 20,000 electric vehicles for the city's pilot electric vehicle leasing program.

In 2013, Kandi announced Kandi EV Car Share, a carsharing program in the city of Hangzhou. The system operated only with Kandi EV all-electric cars, which are available to customers via an automated parking system dubbed a "car vending machine". Leases include insurance, maintenance, and electric power through swapping batteries at the program garages. Kandi planned to make 100,000 cars available to Hangzhou residents over two years.

The Kandi public EV Car Share concept is based on Hangzhou's bike share, the largest in the world and the first of its kind in China according to Guinness World Records. The bike-share has since spread from Hangzhou to 19 Chinese cities including Shanghai and Beijing. According to Forbes, as of July 11, 2012, Kandi had delivered more than 40,000 electric vehicles through its car-sharing program, which was described as the largest of its kind globally at the time.

Kandi initially planned to develop a network of up to 750 garages in collaboration with Geely Auto through a 50-50 joint venture. The program was intended to expand to cities such as Shanghai, Shandong, and Hainan. However, only a few garages were completed, and the project reportedly shifted toward horizontal street parking kiosks due to urban development challenges.

In 2019, Kandi signed a non-binding agreement to act as the electric vehicle supplier for ride-sharing platform Cao Cao Zhuan Che. In 2020, Kandi, together with Zhejiang Ruibo New Energy Vehicle Service Company Ltd. and Jiangsu Jinpeng Group Ltd., founded the ridesharing company Zhejiang Ruiheng Technology Company (aka "Ruiheng").

=== United States expansion ===
In 2019, the company announced plans to expand its business to the United States, as the U.S. National Highway Traffic Safety Administration approved its Model EX3 and Model K22 cars to be exported into the United States.

The company shipped 50–100 EVs to the United States in late May and early June 2019.

In July 2020, Kandi announced that it would be starting sales in Summer 2020 in Dallas-Fort Worth, Texas. Additionally, it released details on the first two cars to hit the market: the Kandi K27 and K23 models.

In July 2024, Kandi America announced that it had partnered with Lowe's to sell a limited-edition set of 32 golf carts with designs featuring NFL teams, to be sold exclusively at Lowe's stores in the U.S.

On December 2, 2024, Kandi appointed Bin Yu as the new Chief Executive Officer of SC Autosports, its wholly owned subsidiary in the United States.

=== Financial performance and market growth ===
In 2023, Kandi reported a net revenue of $123.6 million, marking its highest revenue in three years, with a net profit of $1.7 million, following a net loss of $12.9 million in 2022, despite a 28.8% increase and $117.8 million in revenue.

The company expanded its product line in North America to include electric utility terrain vehicles (UTVs) and mini golf carts.

=== Other developments ===
In November 2020, Hindenburg Research, a short-selling investment firm, released a report accusing Kandi of faking at least 55% of its sales.

On 7 December, Kandi's chairman released a response addressing Hindenburg's short seller report. Kandi responded to the report with a statement claiming that, "Kandi believes that the report contains numerous errors, misstatements of historical facts, inaccurate conclusions, and superfluous opinions."

In December 2017, Kandi acquired the battery technology company Jinhua An Kao.

In 2018, Kandi transitioned into longer-range electric vehicles with the K23 and EX3 models, claiming that its SUV crossover hybrids have more storage capacity than its other offerings.

Kandi acquired Sportsman Country LLC for $10 million in June 2018, which will facilitate the dealer relationships for Kandi's EX3 electric vehicles.

Jiangsu's Development and Reform Commission approved Kandi with one of three EV manufacturing licenses. EVs qualify for subsidies offered by China's central and local governments, on an average of $10,000 per vehicle. EVs are waived from Chinese megacities' license plate fees that apply to vehicles with internal combustion engines, on an average of $14,000 per license plate.

Kandi faced low EV sales in the first quarter of 2019 due to the delay of government subsidies and restructuring of the JV. They planned to increase production for the remaining portion of 2019, and to have a non-binding framework agreement with DiDi to deliver 300,000 EVs over the next five years.

== Products ==
Kandi Technology has developed a range of compact electric vehicles (EVs), utility terrain vehicles (UTVs), and golf carts primarily for the urban and short-distance mobility market. Below is a summary of its key models:

=== Coco (KD08E / KD08A) ===
- Introduced in 2009 in the United States.
- Offered in both electric (KD08E) and gasoline (KD08A) variants.
- Designed for low-speed, neighborhood use.

=== EX3 (formerly K26) ===
- Launched in 2017 as Kandi's first electric SUV.
- Offers a range of approximately 380 km (240 miles) and a top speed of 110 km/h (68 mph).
- Electrified version of the Geely Yuanjing X3 platform.
- Eligible for tax exemptions under China’s NEV (New Energy Vehicle) policy and U.S. federal EV tax credits.

=== K17 ===
- Debuted on August 5, 2016, as Kandi’s first electric vehicle.
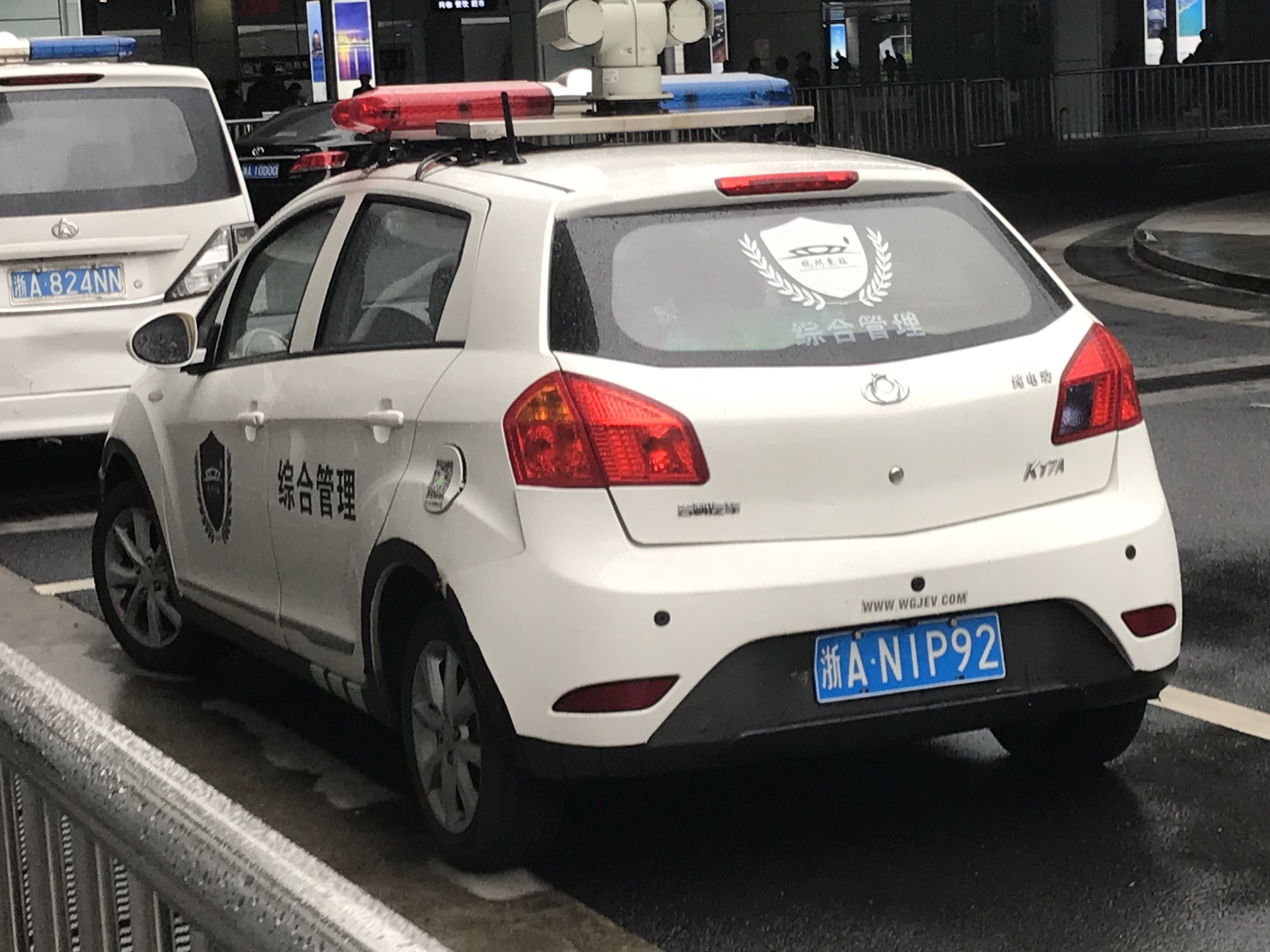
  Rear view of a Kandi K17 (Based on the Geely Englon SC5-RV) police cruiser in Hangzhou, China.
- Based on the Geely Englon SC5-RV platform.
- Used in public service fleets, such as police patrol vehicles in Hangzhou.

=== K23 ===
- A compact electric multi-purpose vehicle (MPV).
- Equipped with a 41.4-kWh battery offering a range of up to 302 km (188 miles).
- Production began in 2018 at Kandi’s Hainan facility.
- In the U.S., speed is electronically limited to 25–35 mph (40–56 km/h) depending on state regulations.

=== K27 ===
- A compact four-door battery electric vehicle (BEV).
- Features a 17.69-kWh lithium battery with a maximum range of 161 km (100 miles).
- Designed for city use with an electronically restricted top speed.
- Marketed as one of the most affordable EVs in the U.S., with prices potentially under $10,000 after federal and state incentives.

=== K32 ===
- An all-electric UTV introduced in 2021.
- Built on the Foday Lion F22 pickup platform.
- Features a dual-motor all-wheel-drive system producing 21 kW (28 hp).
- Standard model: 20.7-kWh battery with a 97 km (60 miles) range.
- Long-range variant: 50-kWh battery with a 240 km (150 miles) range.
- Not approved for public road use; designed for recreational and industrial environments.
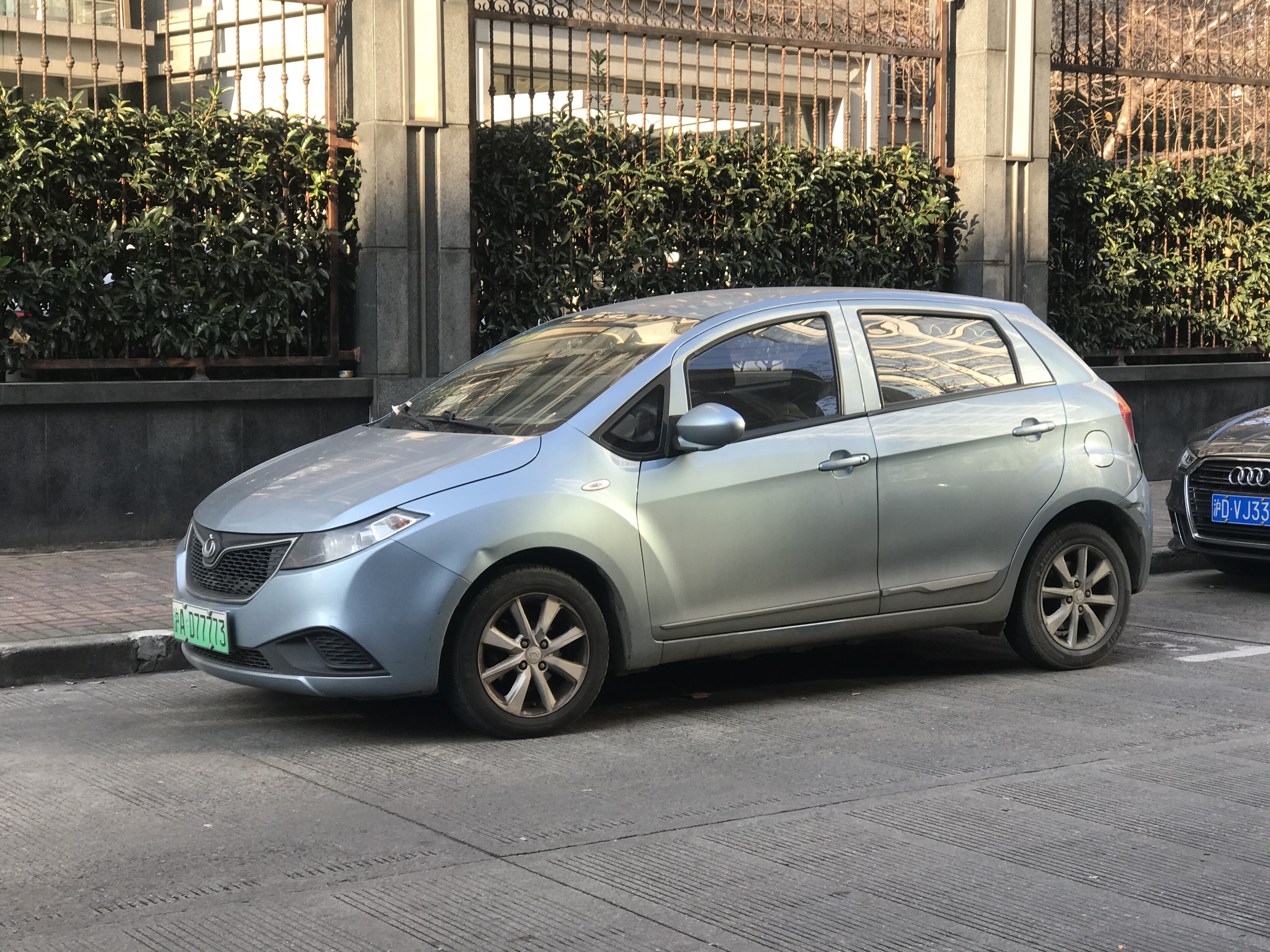
Kandi K17

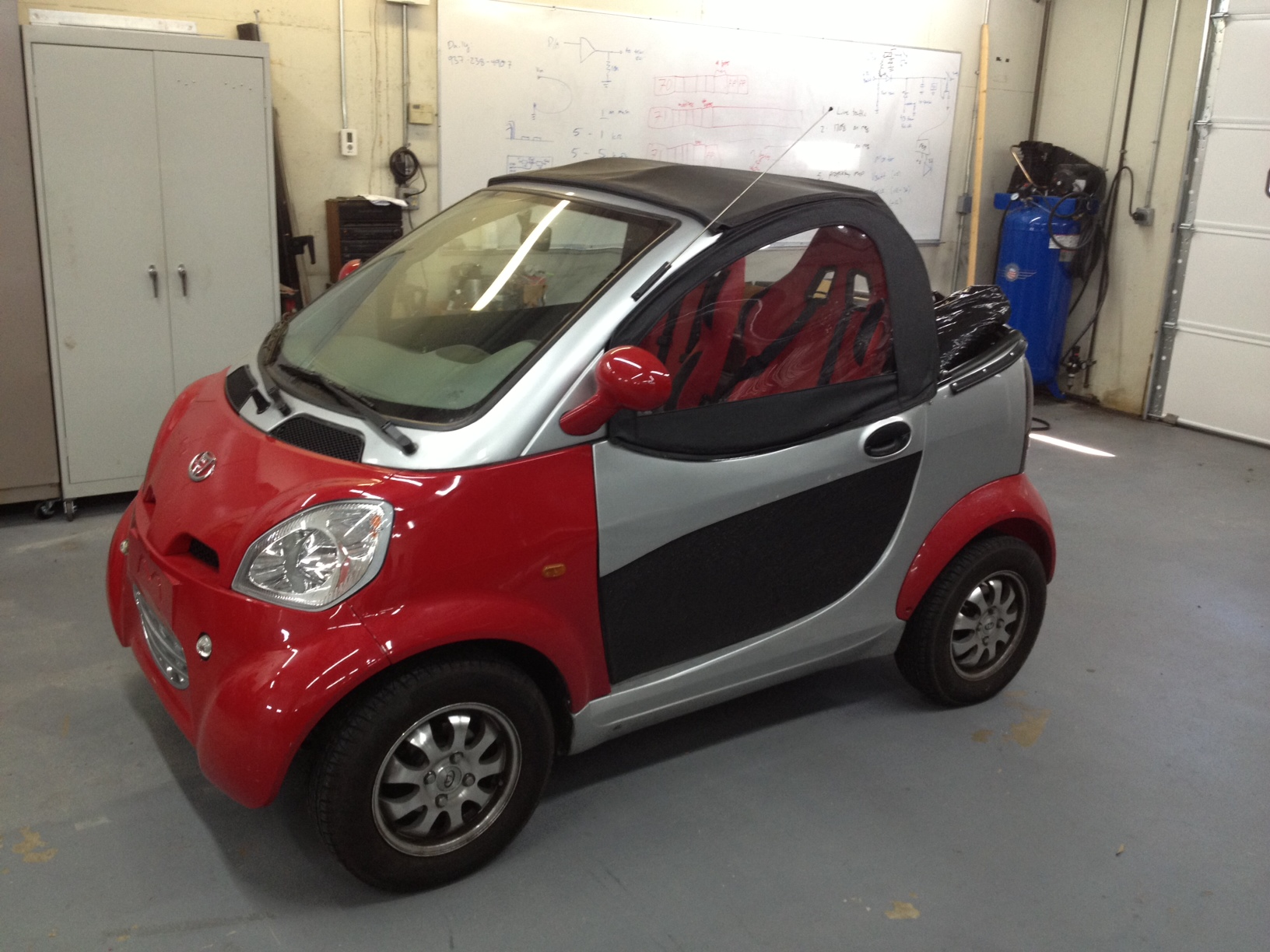
Kandi Coco

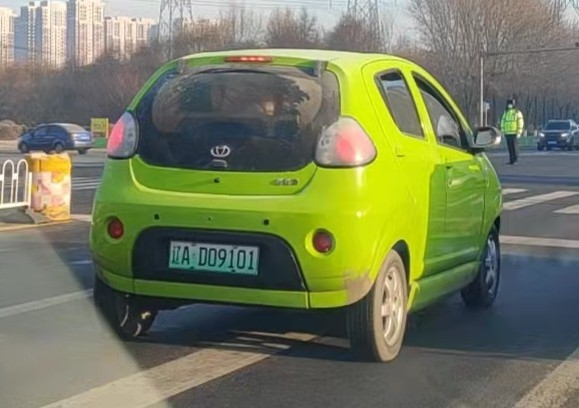
Kandi Panda EV

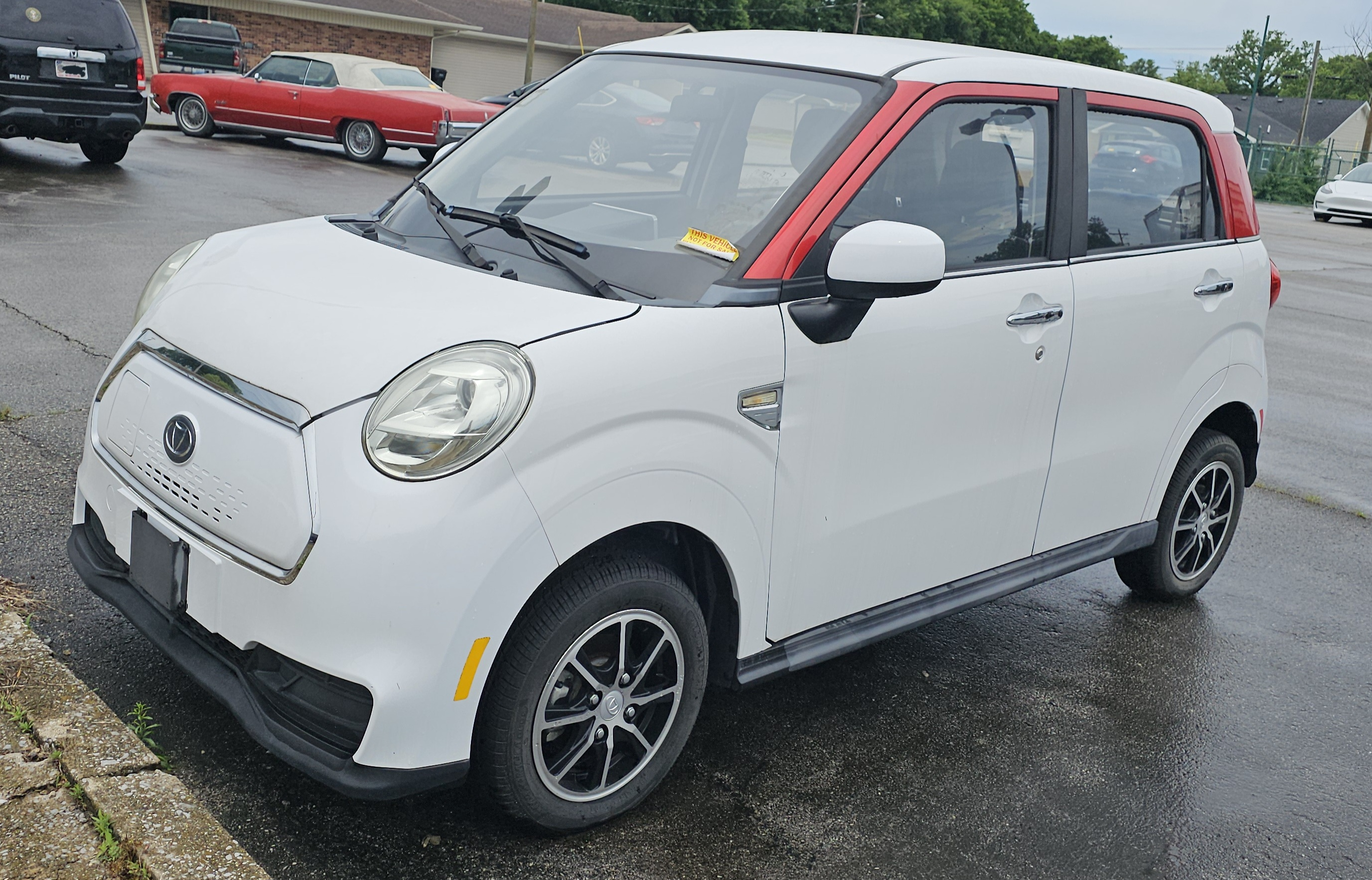
Kandi K27

== Sales ==
A total of 1,215 Kandi EVs were sold in China during the first quarter of 2014, and an additional 4,114 during the second quarter, representing a growth of 238%, and total sales of 5,329 units during the first half of 2014. Kandi EV city car had a price tag of 41,517 yuan ($6,317) in 2015. The China Association of Automobile Manufacturers (CAAM) reported the sale of 16,376 Kandi EVs in 2015.

2015 sales revenue relied heavily on government subsidies. The Chinese government chose to not issue subsidies to Kandi in 2015, and its third 2015 subsidy payment completed on April 21, 2017.

Kandi secured US$105.8 million (754,438,745.80 Chinese Yuan) financing through the National Economic and Technological Development Zone of Rugao City in May 2017.

2018 sales were projected to focus exclusively on the EX3 SUV with a range of 380 km (240 mi).

Quarter	K12 sales	K17 sales	K23 sales	EX3 sales	Total sales	Source
Q3 2017	4,018	2,747			6,765	
Q4 2017	3,398	1,192			4,590 (Note: Total excludes 82 units of unknown models.)	
Q1 2018					3,295 (Note: Total EV Parts, zero EVs.)	
Q2 2018					1,802 (Note: Total EV Parts, zero EVs.)	
Q3 2018					1,502 (Note: Total EV Parts, zero EVs.)	
Q4 2018					3,660 (Note: Total EV Parts, zero EVs.)	
