= Geometry E =

Subcompact crossover SUV

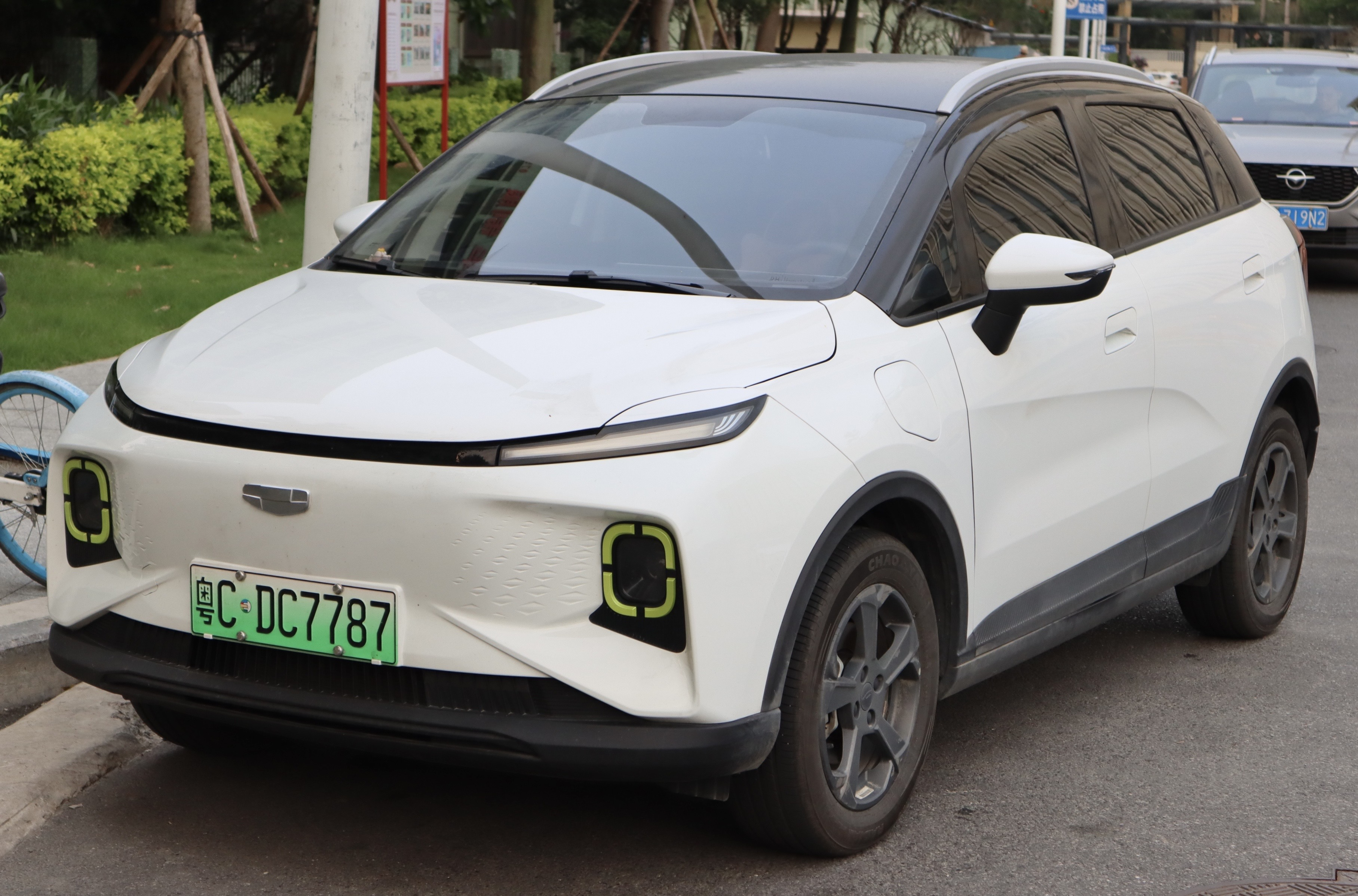

Overview
- Manufacturer: Geely
- Production: 2022–present
- Assembly: China: Qiantang, Hangzhou

Body and chassis
- Class: Subcompact crossover SUV
- Body style: 5-door hatchback
- Layout: Front-engine, front-wheel-drive
- Related: Geely Vision X3; Geometry EX3

Powertrain
- Electric motor: 60 kW (80 hp; 82 PS), 130 N⋅m (95.9 lb⋅ft) TZ160XS601 Permanent Magnet Synchronous Reluctance Motor
- Transmission: 1-speed fixed gear
- Battery: 33.5 kWh (121 MJ) LFP Lithium ion 39.4 kWh (142 MJ) LFP Lithium ion
- Electric range: 320 kilometres (199 mi) Standard (NEDC); 400 kilometres (249 mi) Long Range (NEDC)

Dimensions
- Wheelbase: 2,485 mm (97.8 in)
- Length: 4,004 mm (157.6 in)
- Width: 1,765 mm (69.5 in)
- Height: 1,550 mm (61.0 in)

Chronology
- Predecessor: Geometry EX3

The Geometry E is a battery-powered subcompact crossover produced by Chinese auto manufacturer Geely under the Geometry brand.

== Overview ==
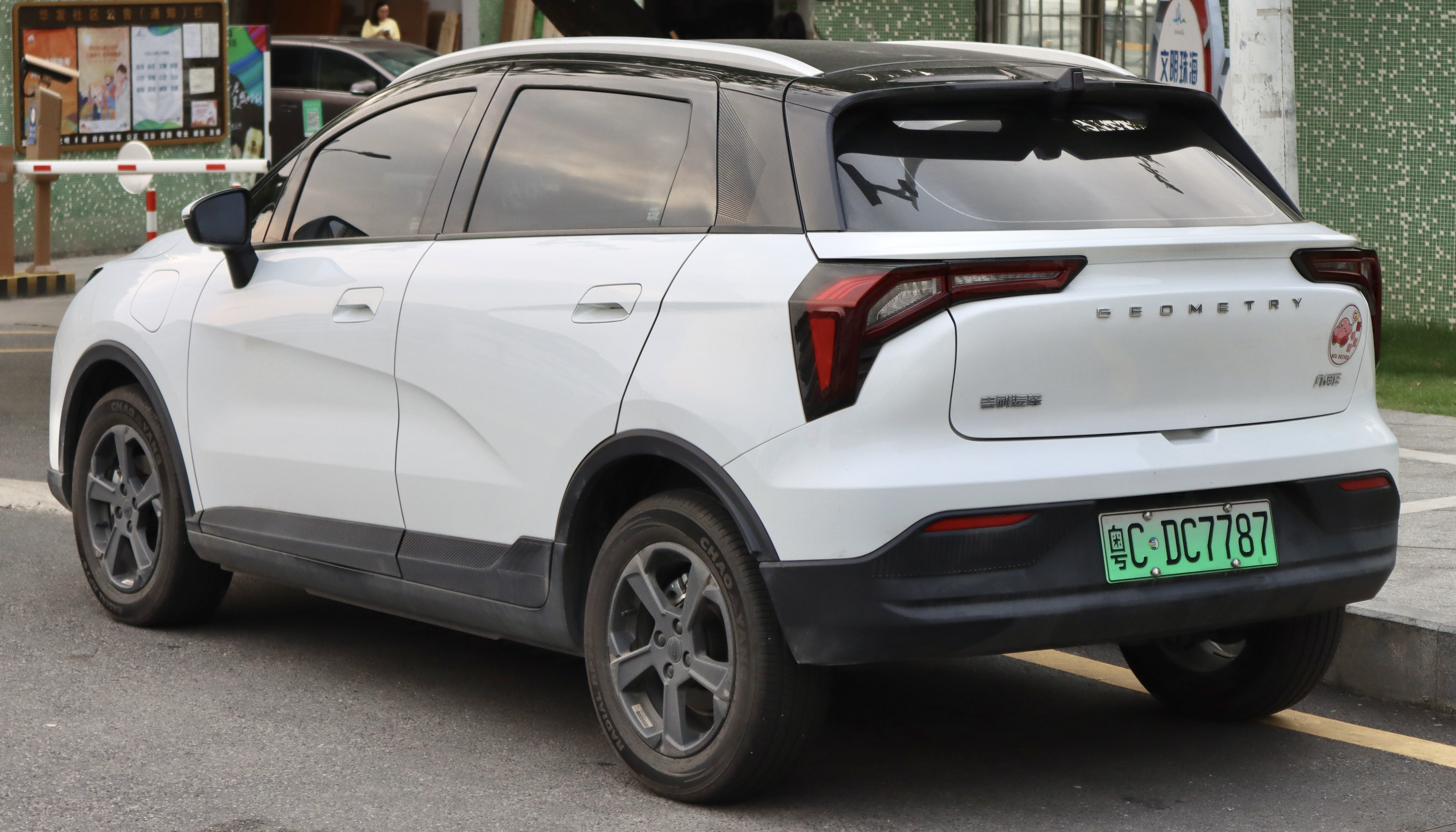
Rear view

The Geometry E is officially the third brand new model of the Geometry brand, while replacing the short-lived Geometry EX3 sold in 2021 alone. It was developed based on the same platform as the Geely Vision X3 and the Geometry EX3 rebadged variant, and comes in three trims; Cute Tiger, Linglong Tiger, and Thunder Tiger. Pricing of the Geometry E starts at $12,947 (86,800 yuan) for the base model, while the Linglong Tiger and Thunder Tiger costs around $14,588 and $15,483 respectively.

The battery of the Geometry E is a base 33.5 kWh and a longer-range 39.4 kWh lithium iron phosphate battery providing a NEDC range of 320 and 401 km (199 and 249 mi) respectively. The electric motor is a TZ160XS601 drive motor produced by GLB Intelligent Power Technologies capable of producing 60 kW and 130 Nm of torque, giving it a top speed of 121 km/h. Charge time for the Geometry E from 0-80% is 30 minutes.

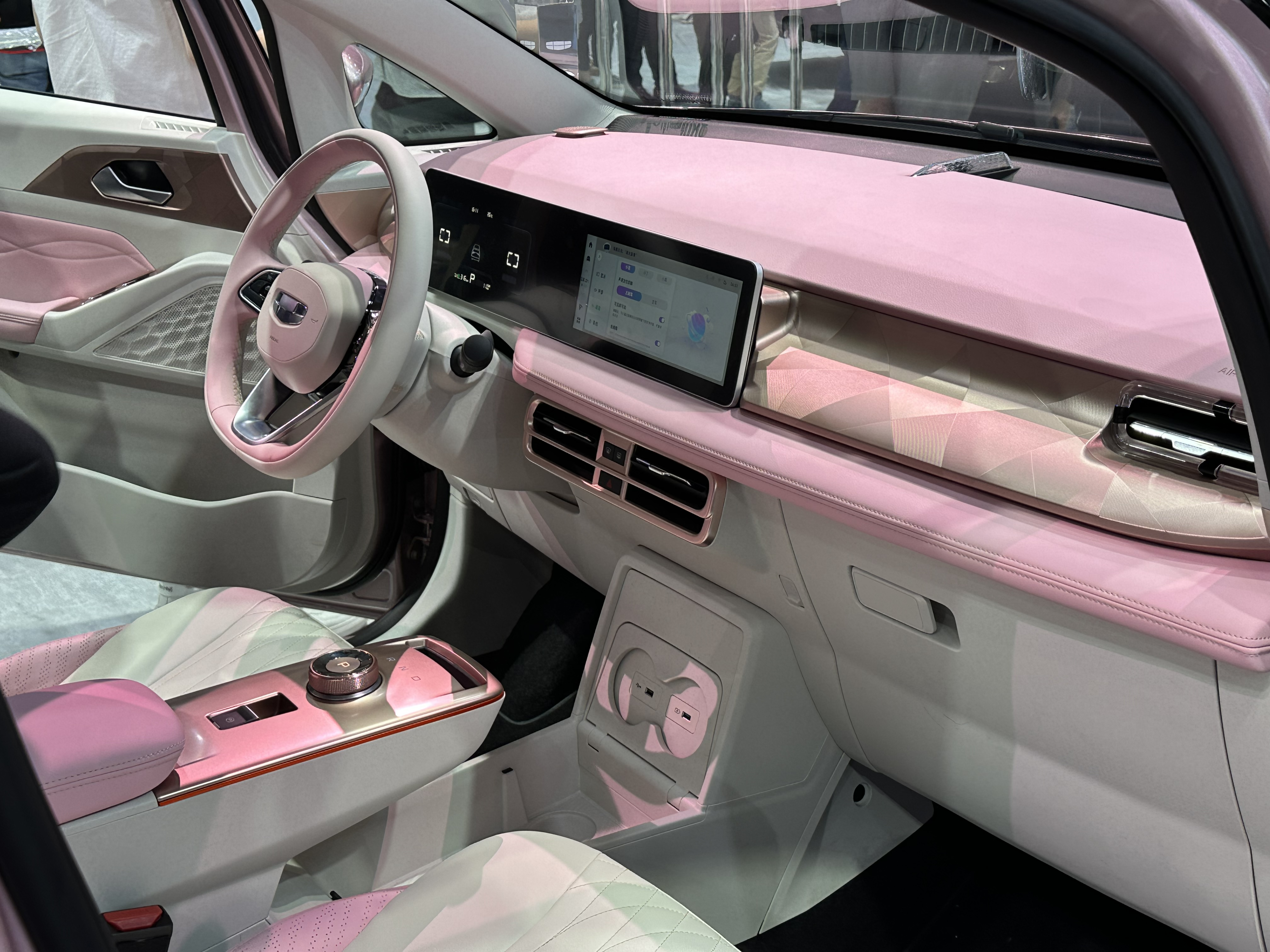
Interior

The interior of the Geometry E features two 10.25-inch infotainment screens and a central control screen as standard.

== Sales ==
Year	China
2022	29,362
2023	33,136
2024	21,384
2025	206
