= Kandi K23 =

Battery electric microvan

Overview
- Manufacturer: Kandi Technologies
- Production: March 2018 – 2021
- Assembly: China: Changxing

Body and chassis
- Class: Microvan (A)
- Body style: 5-door van
- Layout: Front-engine, front-wheel-drive layout

Dimensions
- Wheelbase: 2,649 mm (104.3 in)
- Length: 3,974 mm (156.5 in)
- Width: 1,636 mm (64.4 in)
- Height: 1,625 mm (64.0 in)
- Curb weight: 1,315 kg (2,899 lb)

The Kandi K23 is a battery electric microvan produced by the Chinese manufacturer Kandi Technologies.

== Overview ==
The K23 model was joined the Kandi brand's lineup as a small microvan with an avant-garde design. The car features a richly sculpted, monocoque silhouette, distinguished by soaring, high-mounted headlights and a chrome-trimmed air intake at the front, while the rear is adorned with pillar-mounted taillights.

== Production ==
Along with the smaller K27 model, the K23 was marked the manufacturer entry to the United States market in the second half of 2020.

== Specifications ==
The electric system of the K23 is made of a battery with a capacity of 41.4 kWh, which provides a maximum range of up to 280 kilometers per charge. Replenishing the full condition of the batteries takes about 7.5 hours.
