= Maple Hisoon =

Compact car

Shanghai Maple Hisoon 205
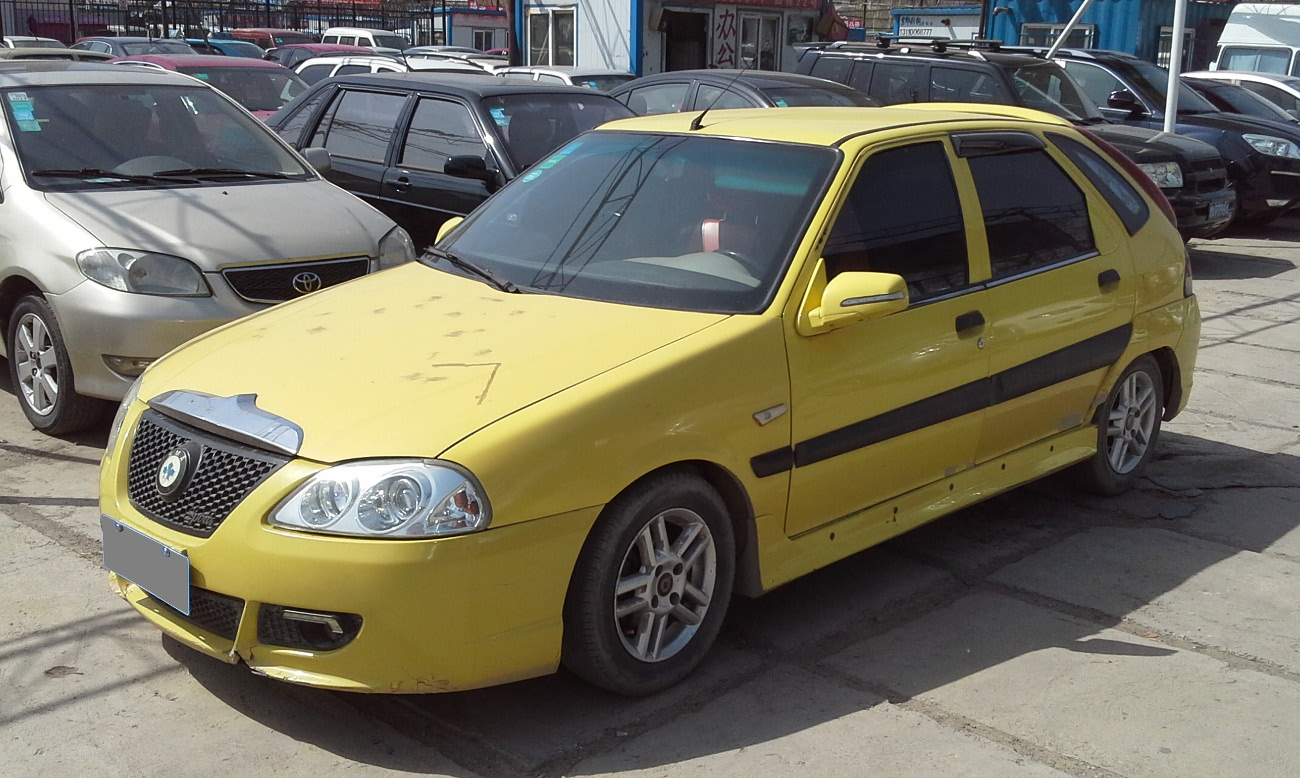

Overview
- Manufacturer: Shanghai Maple
- Also called: SMA Huapu Hai Hyun; SMA Maple R80 (export market); Shanghai Maple C31; Langfeng SMA7150
- Production: 2004–2014

Body and chassis
- Class: Compact car
- Body style: 4-door sedan 5-door hatchback
- Related: Citroën ZX; Citroën Fukang

Powertrain
- Engine: 1.5 L MR479QA I4
- Transmission: 5–speed manual

Dimensions
- Wheelbase: 2,540 mm (100.0 in)
- Length: 4,435 mm (174.6 in) (2007 sedan); 4,183 mm (164.7 in); 4,075 mm (160.4 in) (Biaofeng)
- Width: 1,710 mm (67.3 in); 1,705 mm (67.1 in) (Biaofeng)
- Height: 1,430 mm (56.3 in)

The Maple Hisoon or Haixun (海迅), also known as the SMA Huapu Hyun, is a compact sedan and hatchback produced by the Chinese automaker Shanghai Maple. The vehicle body was shared with the Fukang made in China by the Dongfeng-PSA joint venture despite being unlicensed, with body parts supplied by the suppliers that produces the Citroën Fukang.

== Overview ==
The Maple Haixun hatchback was available from 2004 with three variants dubbed the Biaofeng (飙风) or Whirlwind, M203 and AA featuring different front end designs. The Biaofeng variant was launched in August 2003, and both the entry level Biaofeng variant and the sporty AA variant were offered for the 2004 and 2005 model years. The M203 variant is the only variant available as of 2014.

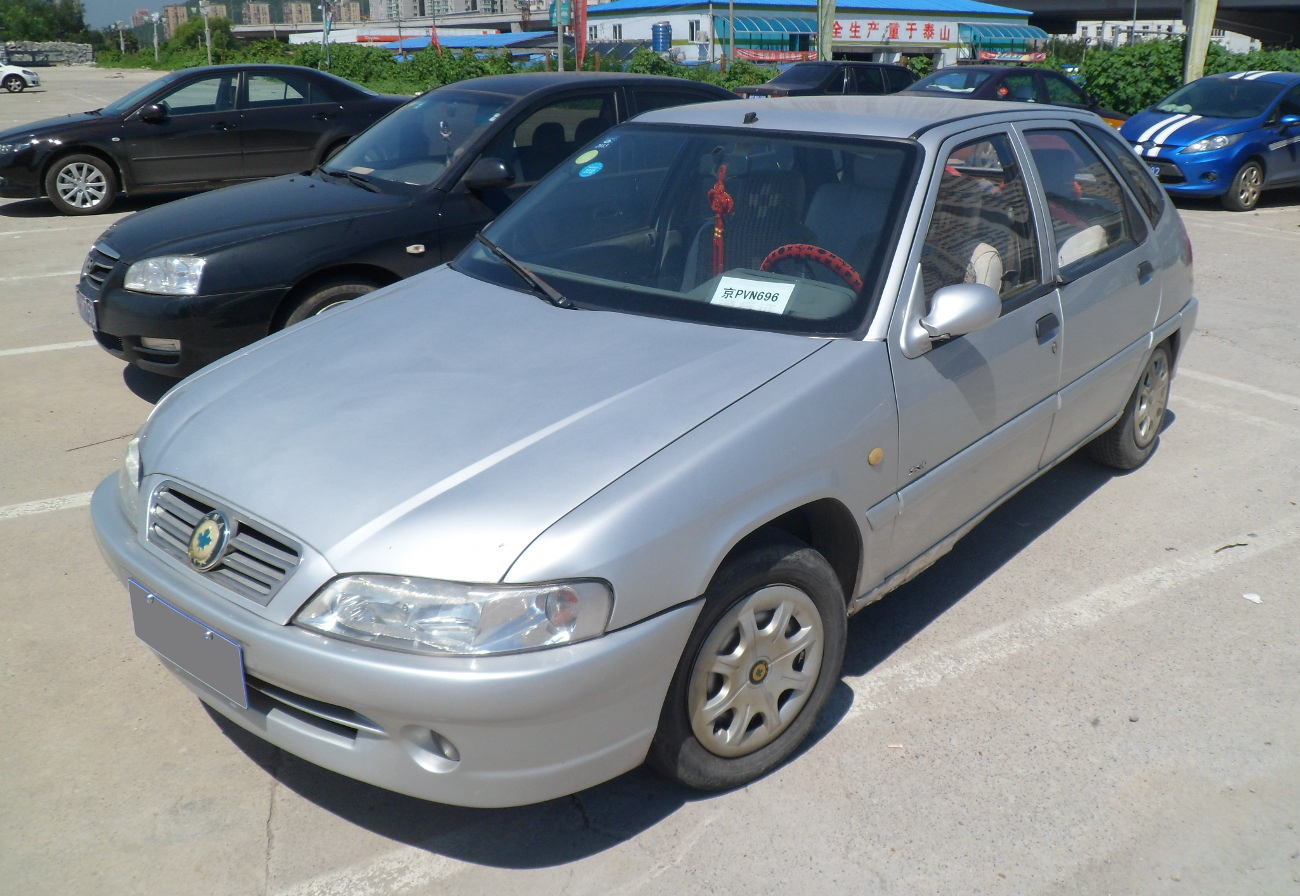
Shanghai Maple Haixun Biaofeng

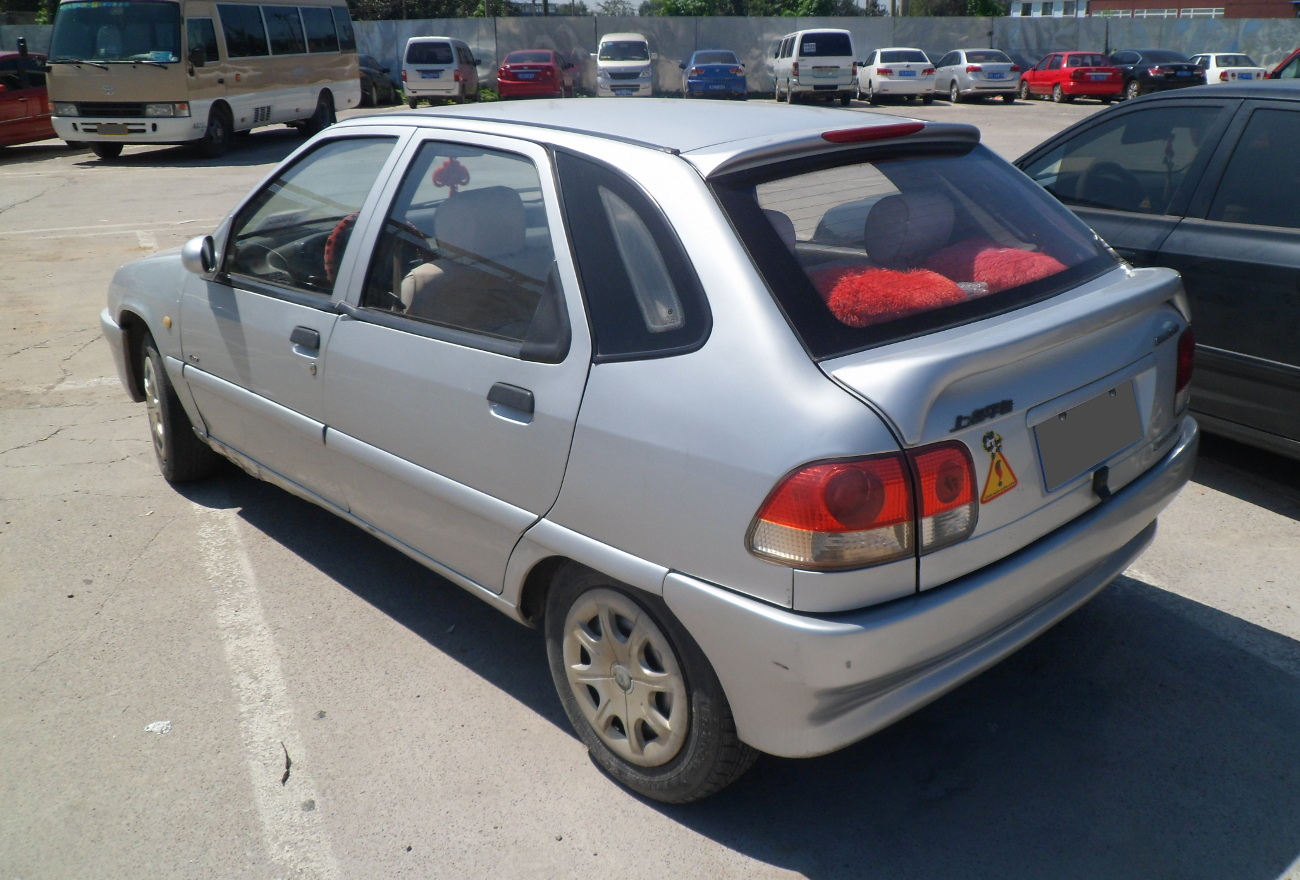
Shanghai Maple Haixun Biaofeng rear
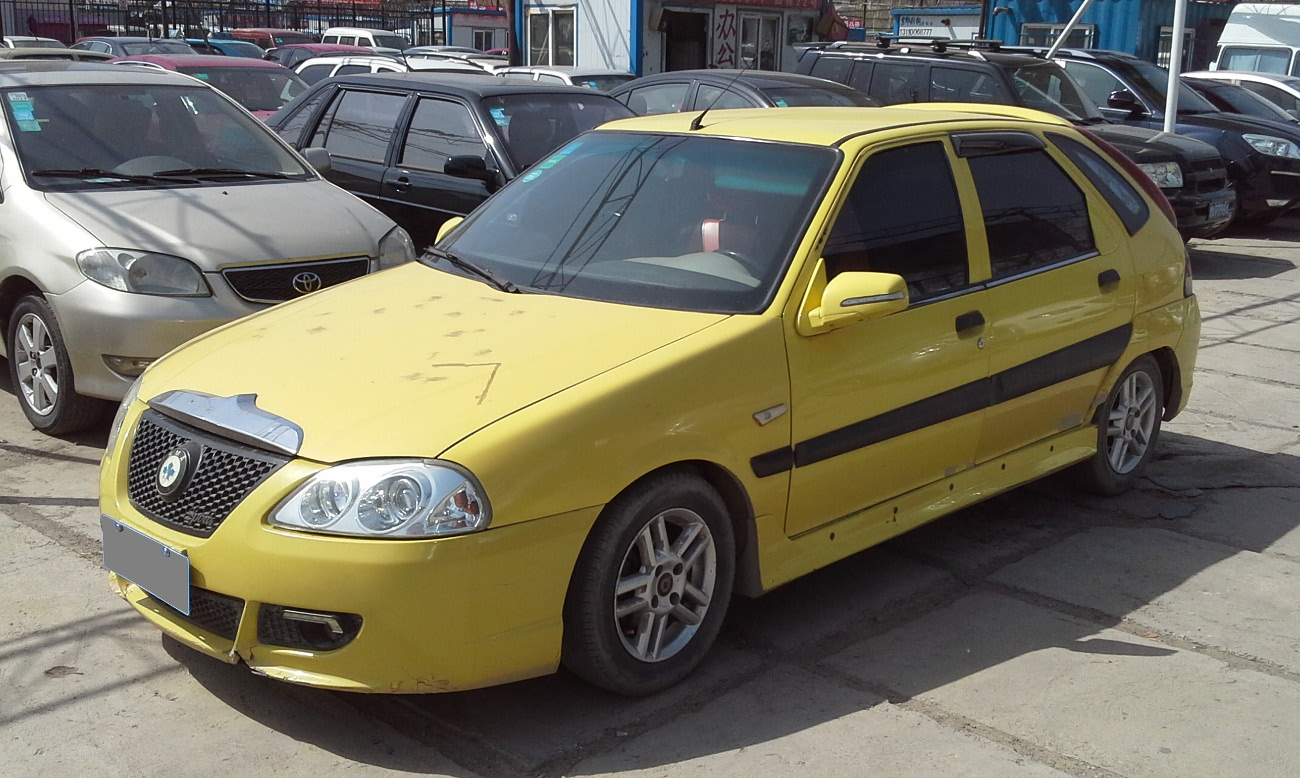
Shanghai Maple Haixun M203 hatchback

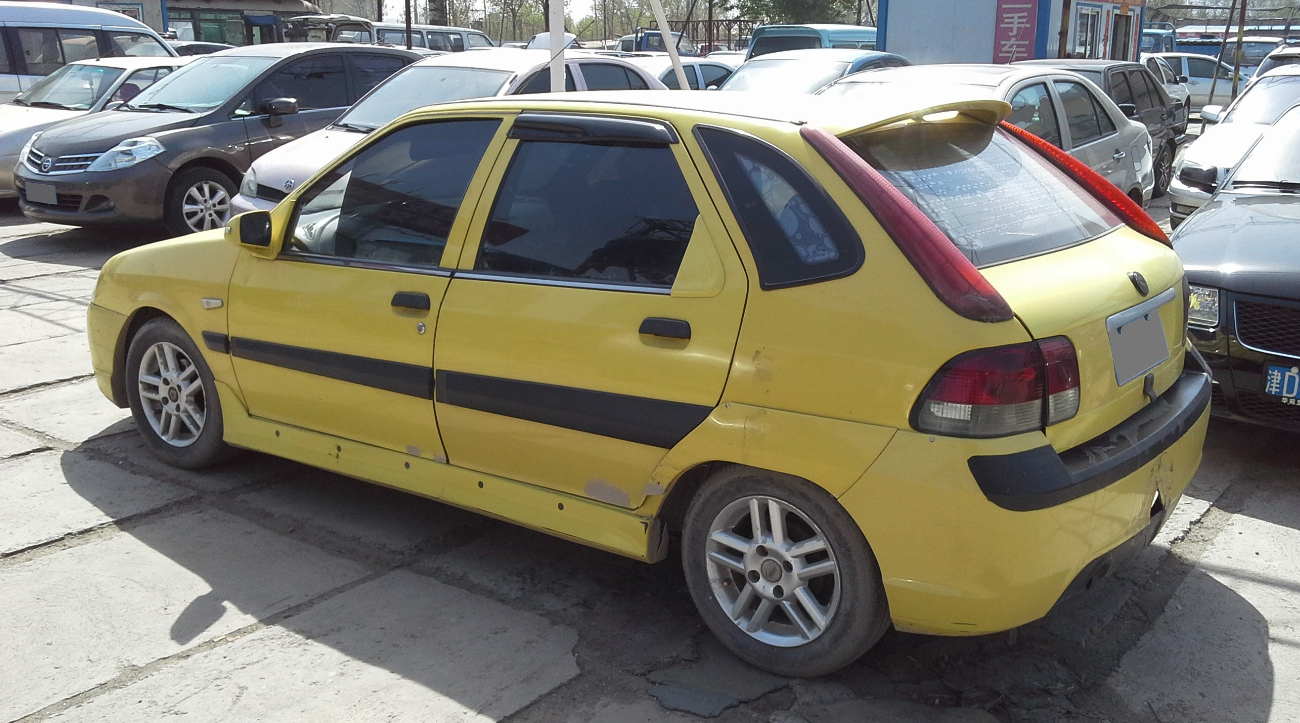
Shanghai Maple Haixun M203 hatchback rear
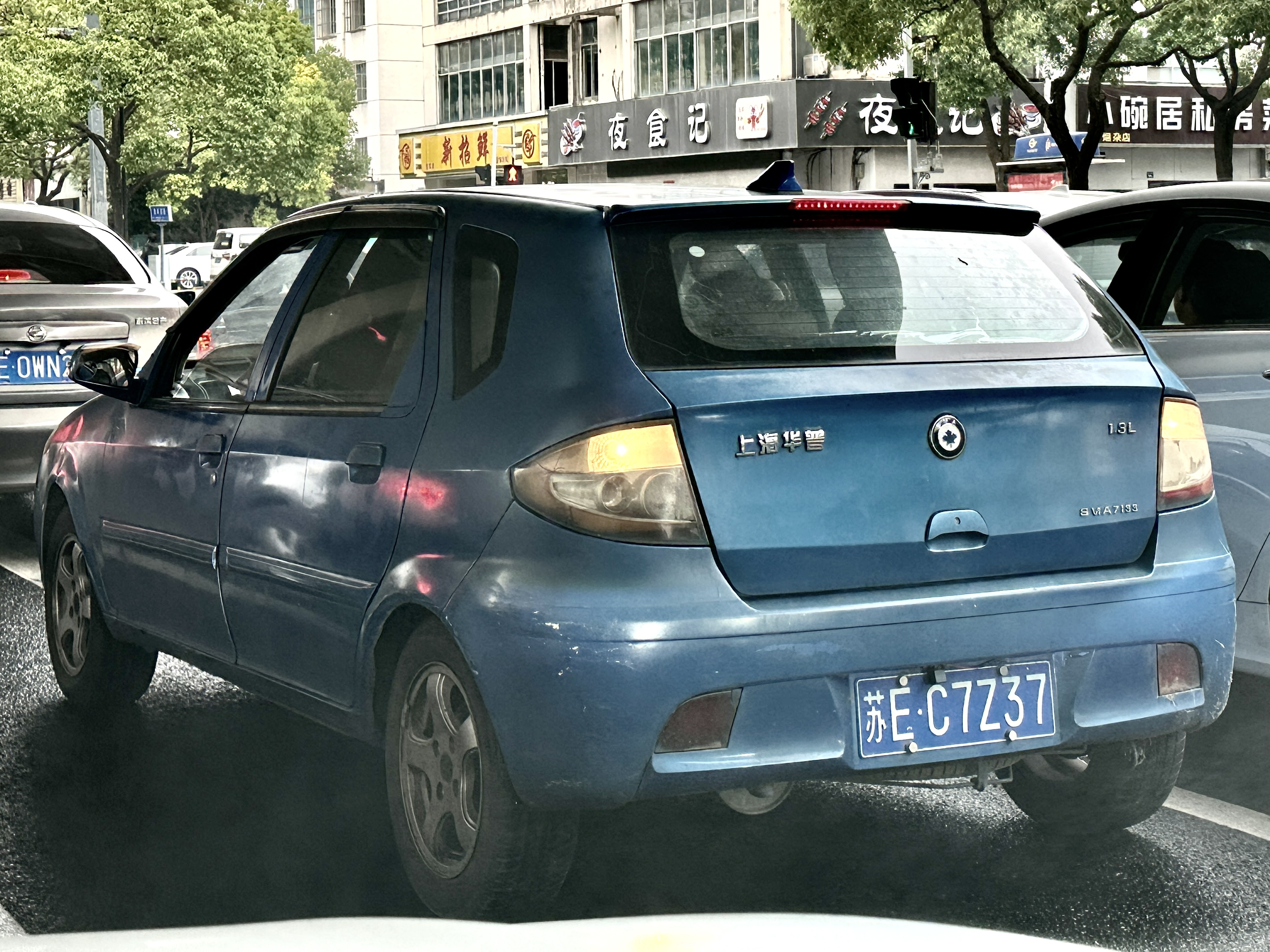
Langfeng SMA7150

The Maple Haixun MA compact sedan was launched in January 2007 alongside the Haiyu MB sedan. The engine of the 2007 Haixun MA compact sedan is a 1.5-litre inline-4 engine producing 94hp and a 1.8-litre inline-4 engine producing 113hp. Both engine models are mated to a 5-speed manual transmission. The engine of the Haixun MA utilizes fuel injection technology supplied by Bosch.

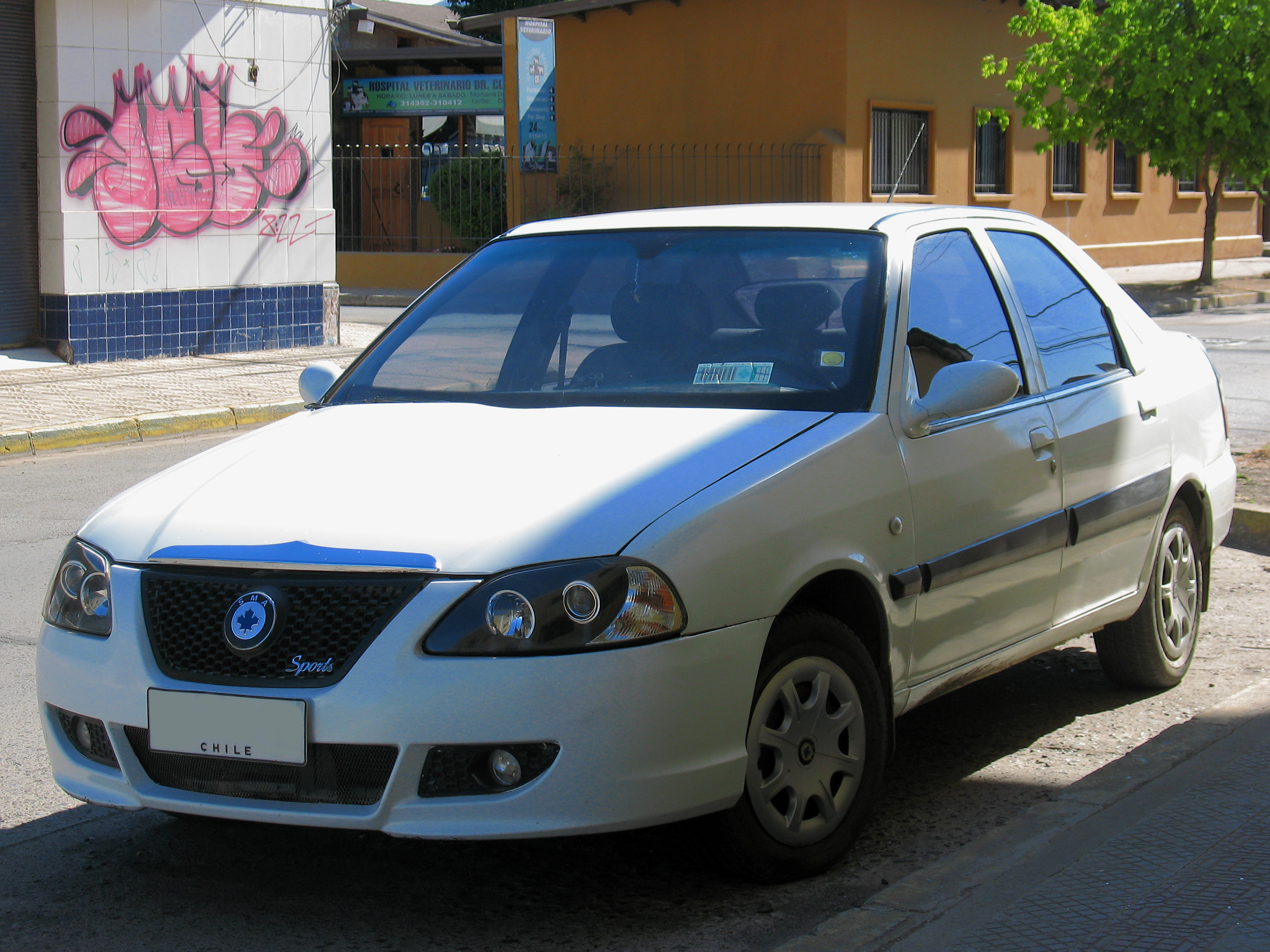
Shanghai Maple Haixun sedan

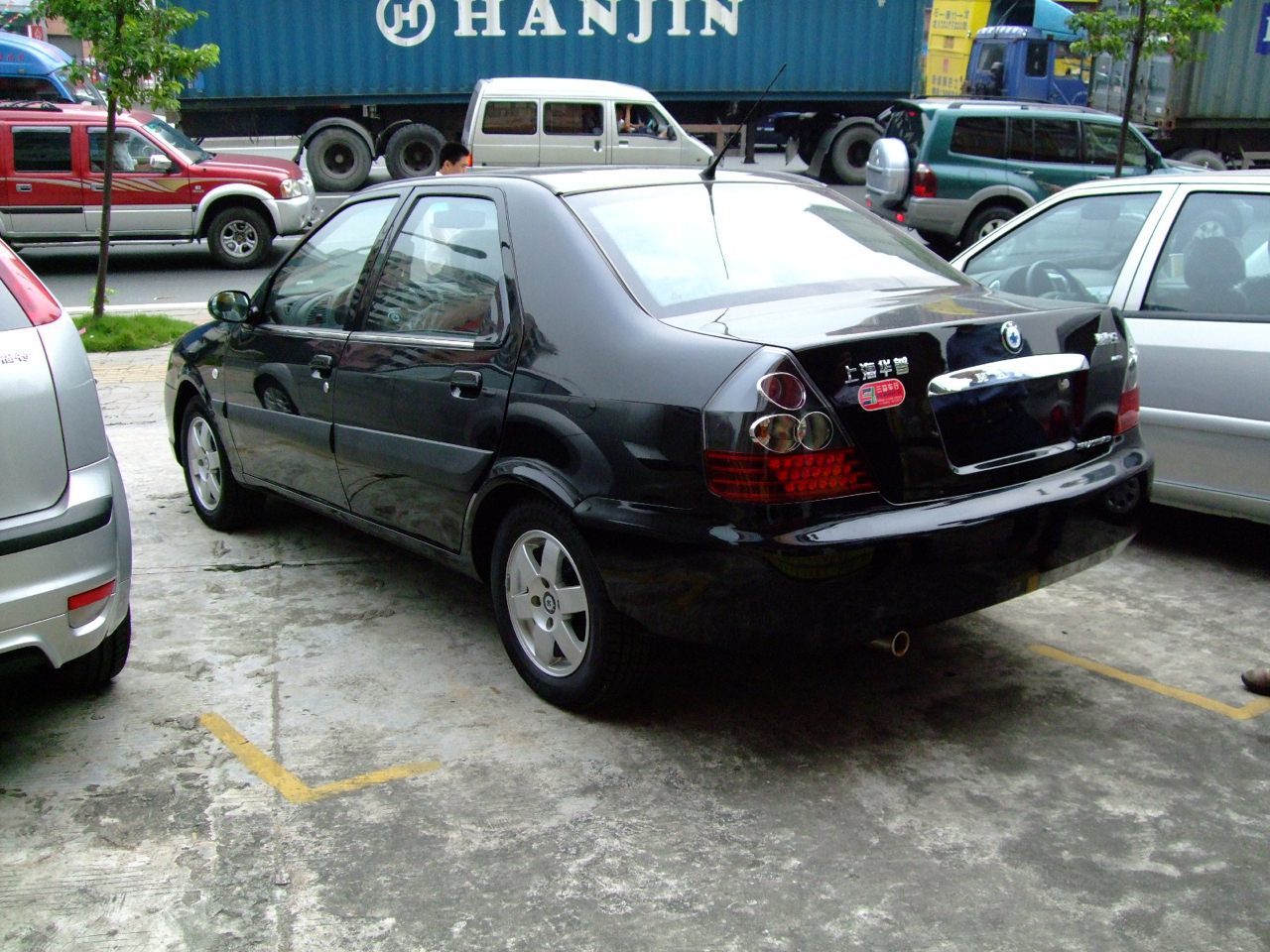
Shanghai Maple Haixun sedan rear

== Design controversies ==
The Maple hatchbacks and sedans are based on the Citroën ZX or Fukang made in China by the Dongfeng-PSA joint venture, with tail lamps inspired by the Honda Civic sedan at the time. The Haixun 4-door sedan is a rebadged variant of the Maple Haifeng and Haiyu compact sedans. The Maple Hisoon was discontinued in 2010.
